= Communauté de communes des Campagnes de l'Artois =

Federation of municipalities in France

Campagnes de l'Artois
- Communauté de communes
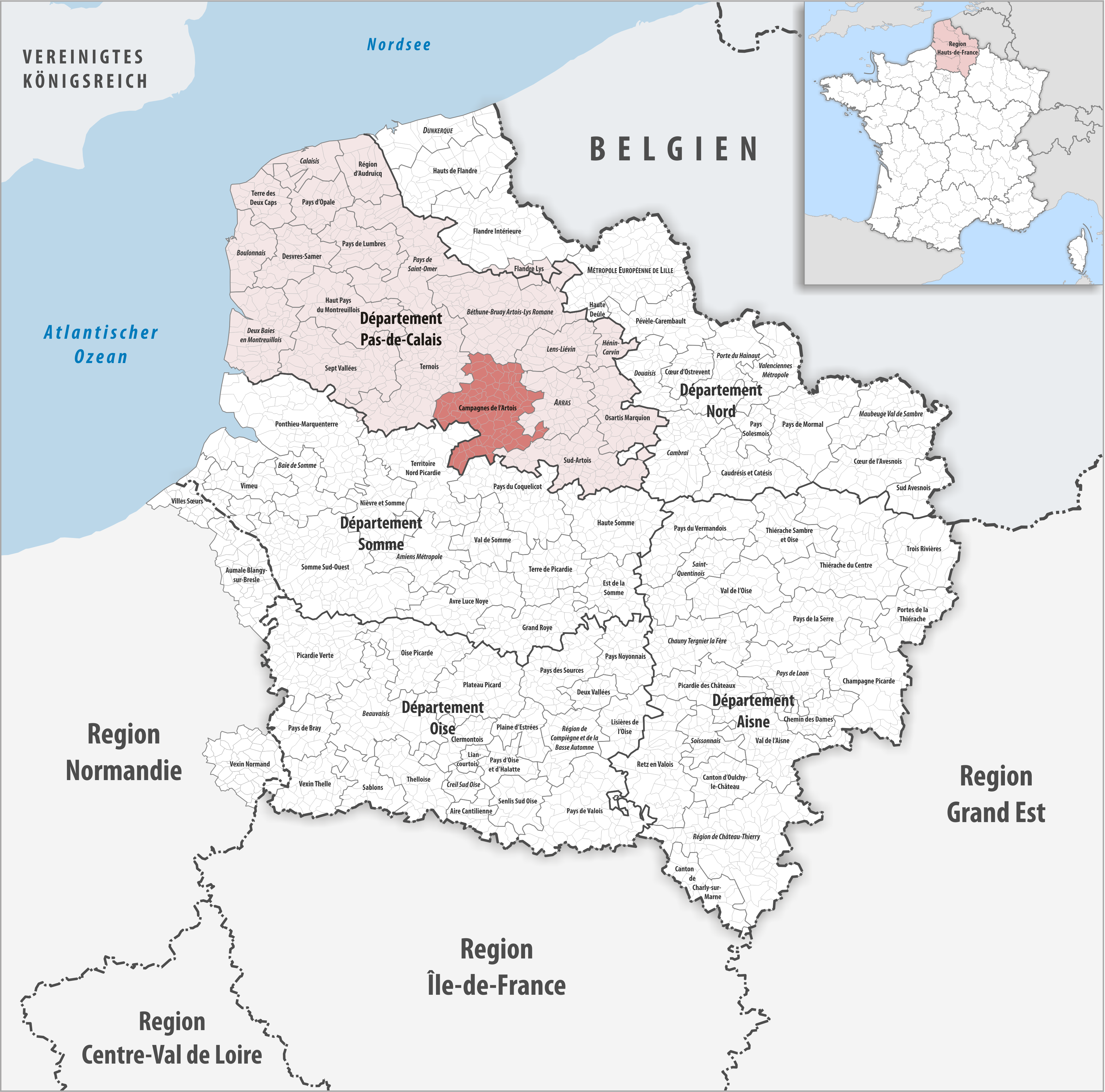
- Location of Campagnes de l'Artois within the Hauts-de-France Region
- Coordinates: 50°17′N 02°32′E
- Country: France
- Region: Hauts-de-France
- Department: Pas-de-Calais
- No. of communes: {{{nbcomm}}}
- Established: 2009
- Area: 553.8 km^{2} (213.8 sq mi)
- Population (2018): 33,193
  - Density: 59.94/km^{2} (155.2/sq mi)

The Communauté de communes des Campagnes de l'Artois is a communauté de communes, an intercommunal structure, in the Pas-de-Calais department, in the Hauts-de-France region, northern France. It was created in January 2017 by the merger of the former communautés de communes L'Atrébatie, La Porte des Vallées and Les Deux Sources. Its area is 553.8 km^{2}, and its population was 33,193 in 2018. Its seat is in Avesnes-le-Comte.

== Composition ==
The communauté de communes consists of the following 96 communes:

1. Adinfer
2. Agnez-lès-Duisans
3. Agnières
4. Ambrines
5. Amplier
6. Aubigny-en-Artois
7. Avesnes-le-Comte
8. Bailleul-aux-Cornailles
9. Bailleulmont
10. Bailleulval
11. Barly
12. Bavincourt
13. Beaudricourt
14. Beaufort-Blavincourt
15. Berlencourt-le-Cauroy
16. Berles-au-Bois
17. Berles-Monchel
18. Berneville
19. Béthonsart
20. Bienvillers-au-Bois
21. Blairville
22. Camblain-l'Abbé
23. Cambligneul
24. Canettemont
25. Capelle-Fermont
26. La Cauchie
27. Chelers
28. Couin
29. Coullemont
30. Couturelle
31. Denier
32. Duisans
33. Estrée-Wamin
34. Famechon
35. Fosseux
36. Frévillers
37. Frévin-Capelle
38. Gaudiempré
39. Givenchy-le-Noble
40. Gouves
41. Gouy-en-Artois
42. Grand-Rullecourt
43. Grincourt-lès-Pas
44. Habarcq
45. Halloy
46. Hannescamps
47. Haute-Avesnes
48. Hauteville
49. Hendecourt-lès-Ransart
50. Hénu
51. La Herlière
52. Hermaville
53. Houvin-Houvigneul
54. Humbercamps
55. Ivergny
56. Izel-lès-Hameau
57. Lattre-Saint-Quentin
58. Liencourt
59. Lignereuil
60. Magnicourt-en-Comte
61. Magnicourt-sur-Canche
62. Maizières
63. Manin
64. Mingoval
65. Monchiet
66. Monchy-au-Bois
67. Mondicourt
68. Montenescourt
69. Noyellette
70. Noyelle-Vion
71. Orville
72. Pas-en-Artois
73. Penin
74. Pommera
75. Pommier
76. Rebreuve-sur-Canche
77. Rebreuviette
78. Saint-Amand
79. Sars-le-Bois
80. Sarton
81. Saulty
82. Savy-Berlette
83. Simencourt
84. Sombrin
85. Le Souich
86. Sus-Saint-Léger
87. Thièvres
88. Tilloy-lès-Hermaville
89. Tincques
90. Villers-Brûlin
91. Villers-Châtel
92. Villers-Sir-Simon
93. Wanquetin
94. Warlincourt-lès-Pas
95. Warlus
96. Warluzel
