= Simencourt =

- Commune
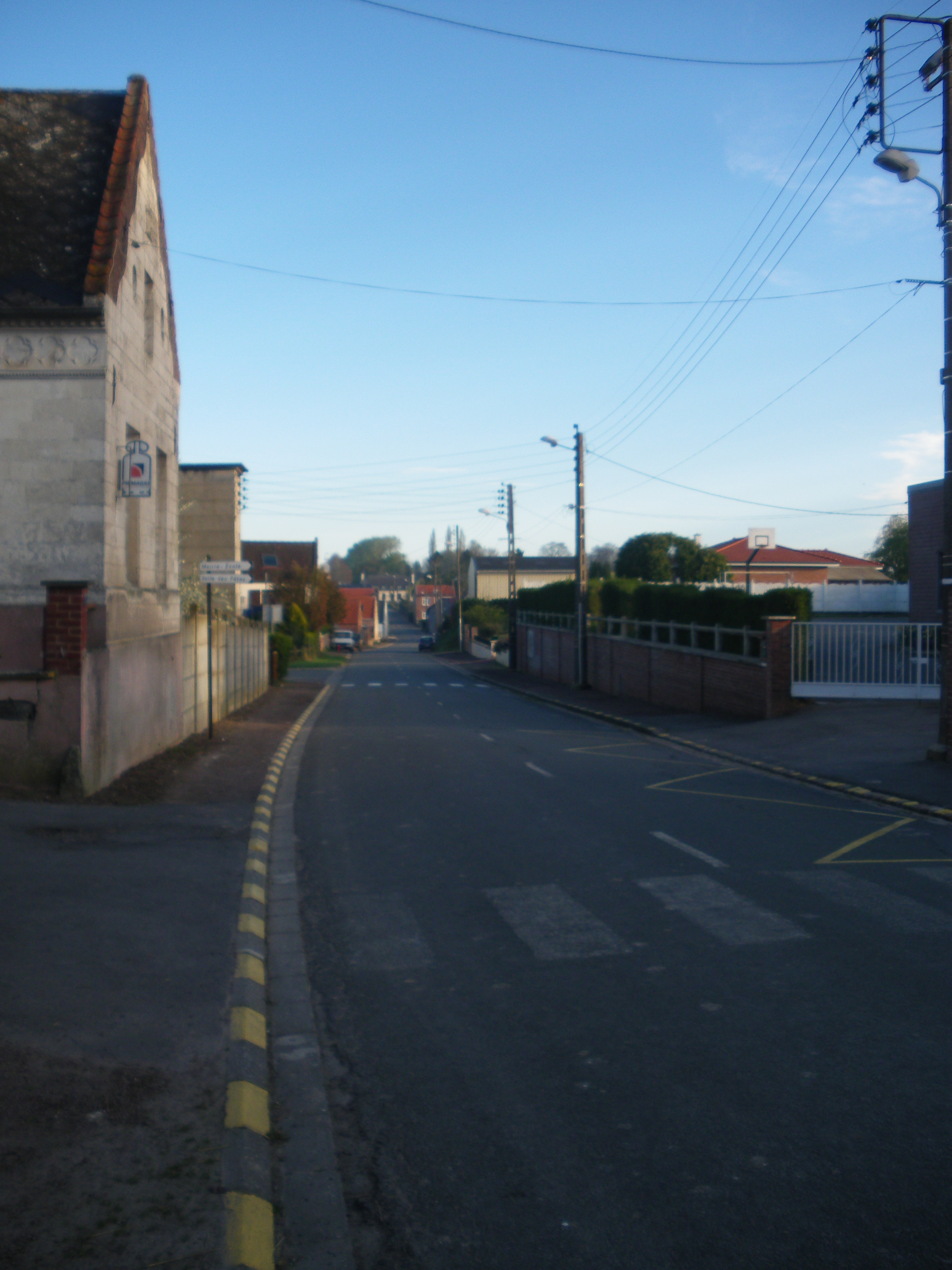
- The main road of Simencourt

- Coat of arms
- Location of Simencourt
- Location within France Location within Hauts-de-France
- Coordinates: 50°15′32″N 2°38′38″E
- Country: France
- Region: Hauts-de-France
- Department: Pas-de-Calais
- Arrondissement: Arras
- Canton: Avesnes-le-Comte
- Intercommunality: CC Campagnes de l'Artois

Government
  - Mayor (2020–2026): Françoise Simon-Pruvost
- Area^{1}: 5.06 km^{2} (1.95 sq mi)
- Elevation: 90 m (300 ft)
- Highest elevation: 140 m (460 ft)
- Lowest elevation: 91 m (299 ft)
- Population (2023): 569
  - Density: 112/km^{2} (291/sq mi)
- Time zone: UTC+01:00 (CET)
  - Summer (DST): UTC+02:00 (CEST)
- INSEE/Postal code: 62796 /62123
- ^{1} French Land Register data, which excludes lakes, ponds, glaciers > 1 km^{2} (0.386 sq mi or 247 acres) and river estuaries.

Simencourt (French pronunciation: [simɑ̃kuʁ]) is a commune in the Pas-de-Calais department in the Hauts-de-France region of France 7 miles (11 km) southwest of Arras.

== Population ==
Historical population
Year	Pop.	±% p.a.
1968	360	—
1975	361	+0.04%
1982	413	+1.94%
1990	523	+3.00%
1999	534	+0.23%
2007	544	+0.23%
2012	535	−0.33%
2017	557	+0.81%
2023	569	+0.36%
Source: INSEE

== See also ==
- Communes of the Pas-de-Calais department
