= Sars-le-Bois =

- Commune
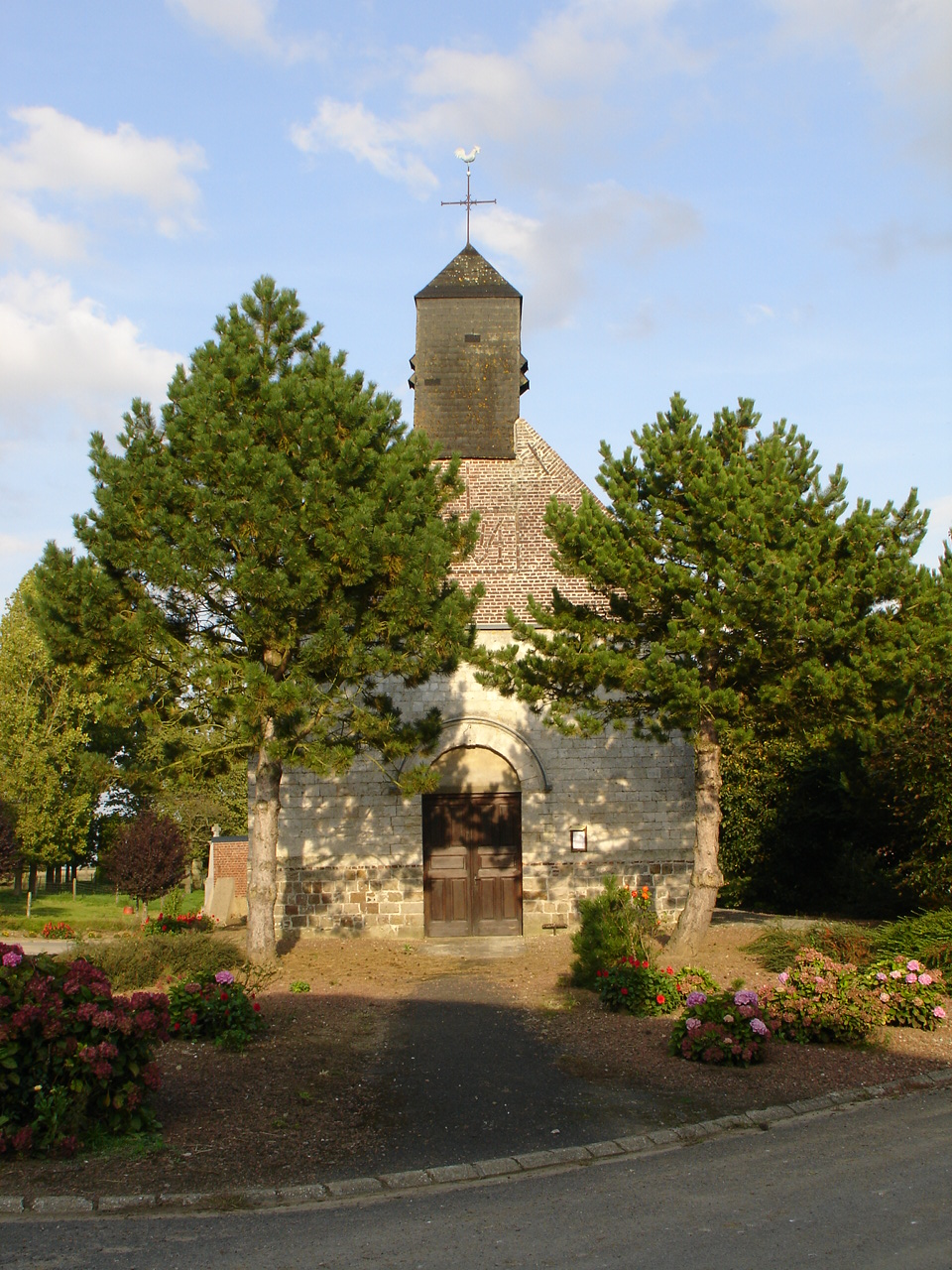
- The church of Sars-le-Bois

- Coat of arms
- Location of Sars-le-Bois
- Location within France Location within Hauts-de-France
- Coordinates: 50°17′45″N 2°25′46″E
- Country: France
- Region: Hauts-de-France
- Department: Pas-de-Calais
- Arrondissement: Arras
- Canton: Avesnes-le-Comte
- Intercommunality: CC Campagnes de l'Artois

Government
  - Mayor (2020–2026): Edouard Hautecoeur
- Area^{1}: 2.39 km^{2} (0.92 sq mi)
- Elevation: 136 m (446 ft)
- Highest elevation: 141 m (463 ft)
- Lowest elevation: 95 m (312 ft)
- Population (2023): 83
  - Density: 35/km^{2} (90/sq mi)
- Time zone: UTC+01:00 (CET)
  - Summer (DST): UTC+02:00 (CEST)
- INSEE/Postal code: 62778 /62810
- ^{1} French Land Register data, which excludes lakes, ponds, glaciers > 1 km^{2} (0.386 sq mi or 247 acres) and river estuaries.

Sars-le-Bois is a commune in the Pas-de-Calais department in the Hauts-de-France region of France.

== Geography ==
Sars-le-Bois lies on the banks of the river Canche, some 16 miles (26 km) west of Arras, on the D79E road.

== Population ==
Historical population
Year	Pop.	±% p.a.
1968	86	—
1975	69	−3.10%
1982	66	−0.63%
1990	62	−0.78%
1999	66	+0.70%
2007	68	+0.37%
2012	69	+0.29%
2017	82	+3.51%
2023	83	+0.20%
Source: INSEE

== Places of interest ==
- The church of St.Nicholas, dating from the eighteenth century.

== See also ==
- Communes of the Pas-de-Calais department
