= Magnicourt-sur-Canche =

- Commune
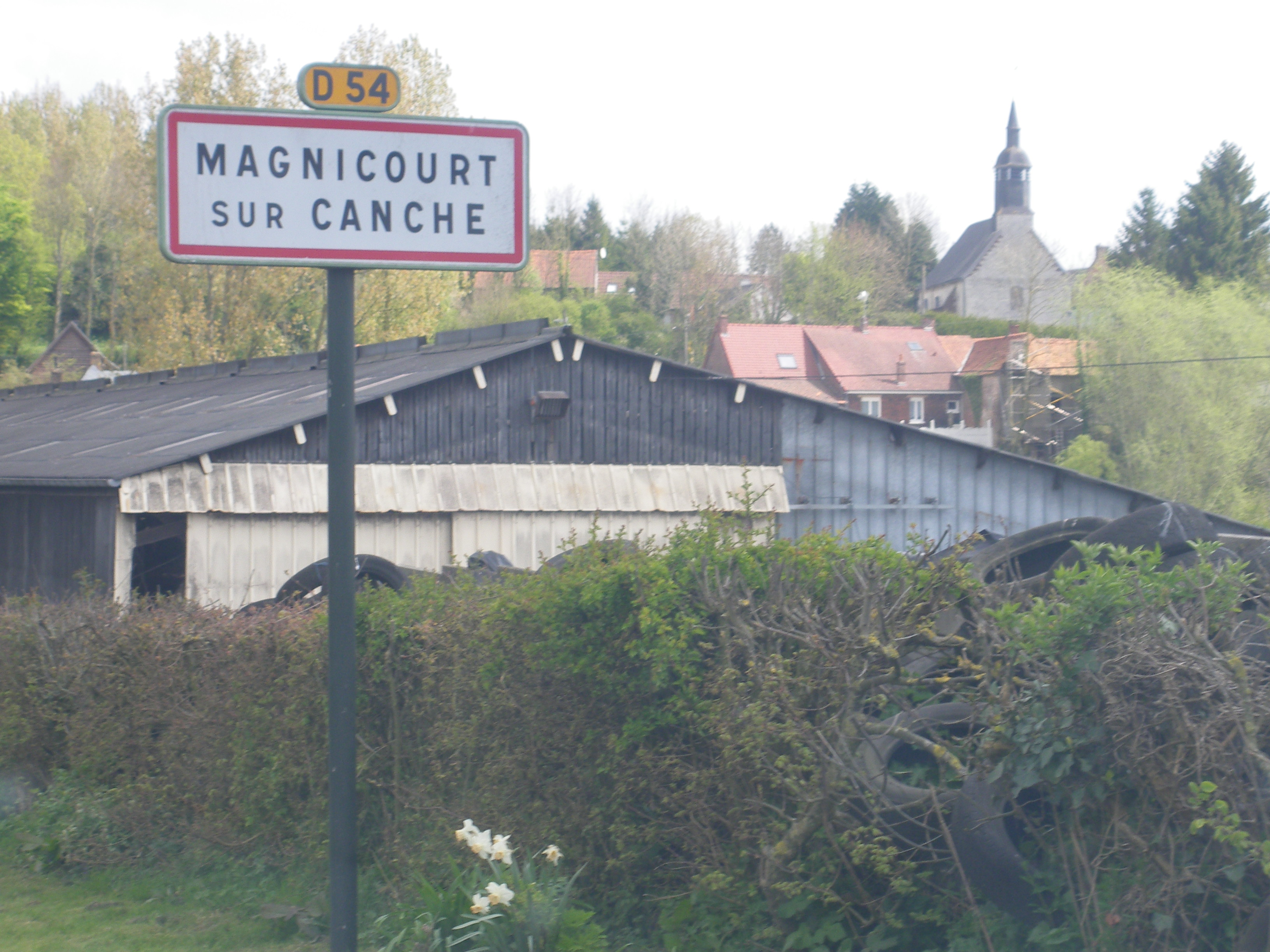
- Magnicourt-sur-Canche

- Coat of arms
- Location of Magnicourt-sur-Canche
- Location within France Location within Hauts-de-France
- Coordinates: 50°18′11″N 2°24′42″E
- Country: France
- Region: Hauts-de-France
- Department: Pas-de-Calais
- Arrondissement: Arras
- Canton: Avesnes-le-Comte
- Intercommunality: CC Campagnes de l'Artois

Government
  - Mayor (2020–2026): Marc Degrendele
- Area^{1}: 4.57 km^{2} (1.76 sq mi)
- Elevation: 133 m (436 ft)
- Highest elevation: 144 m (472 ft)
- Lowest elevation: 100 m (330 ft)
- Population (2023): 105
  - Density: 23.0/km^{2} (59.5/sq mi)
- Time zone: UTC+01:00 (CET)
  - Summer (DST): UTC+02:00 (CEST)
- INSEE/Postal code: 62537 /62270
- ^{1} French Land Register data, which excludes lakes, ponds, glaciers > 1 km^{2} (0.386 sq mi or 247 acres) and river estuaries.

Magnicourt-sur-Canche (French pronunciation: [maɲikuʁ syʁ kɑ̃ʃ], literally Magnicourt on Canche) is a commune in the Pas-de-Calais department in the Hauts-de-France region of France.

== Geography ==
Magnicourt-sur-Canche is situated 18 miles (29 km) west of Arras, at the junction of the D54 and the D82E roads, by the banks of the river Canche.

== Population ==
Historical population
Year	Pop.	±% p.a.
1968	140	—
1975	100	−4.69%
1982	80	−3.14%
1990	79	−0.16%
1999	99	+2.54%
2007	104	+0.62%
2012	106	+0.38%
2017	117	+1.99%
2023	105	−1.79%
Source: INSEE

== Places of interest ==
- The church of St.Vaast, dating from the eighteenth century.
- The seventeenth century manor house,

== See also ==
- Communes of the Pas-de-Calais department
