= Liencourt =

- Commune
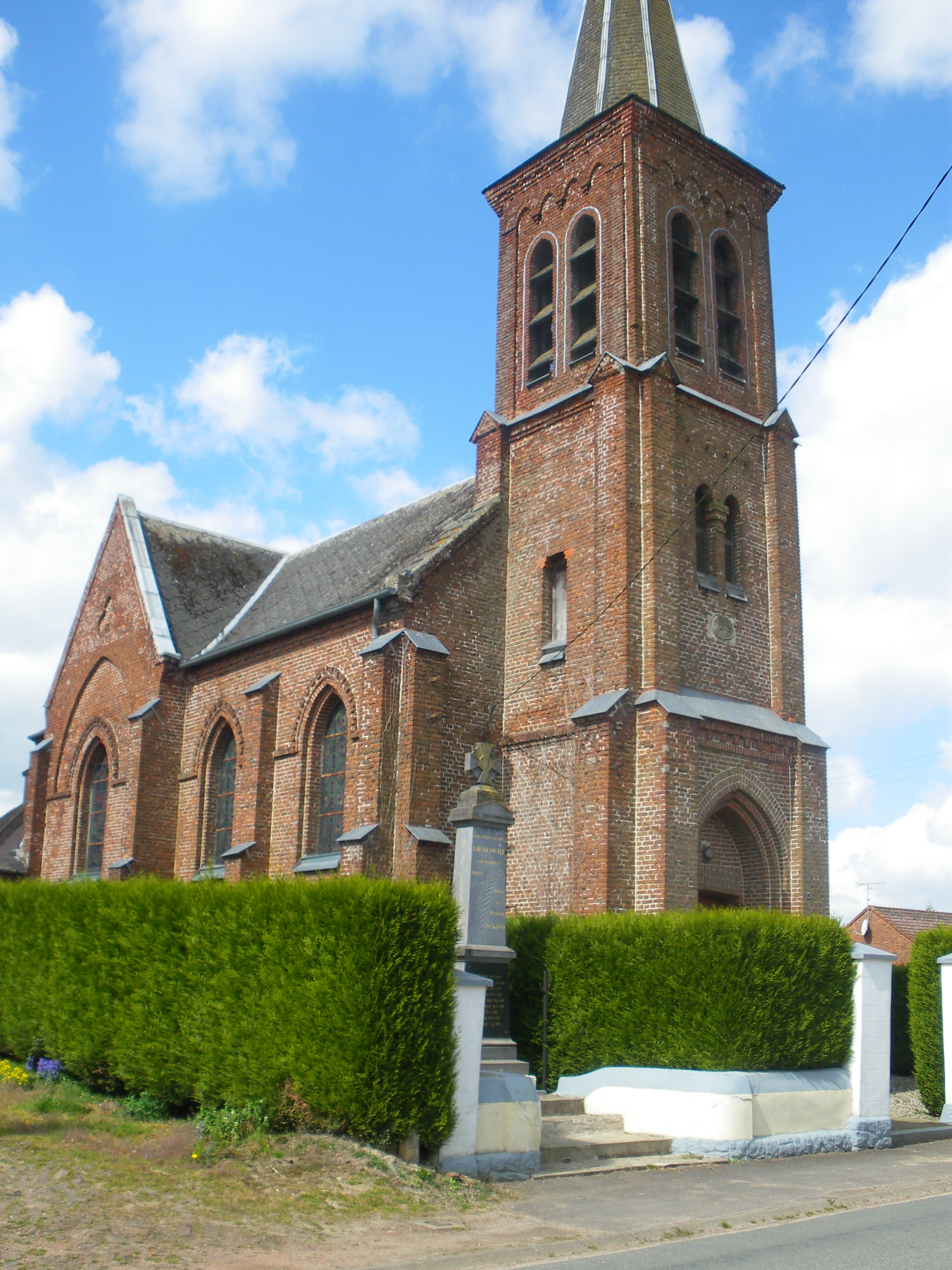
- The church of Liencourt

- Coat of arms
- Location of Liencourt
- Location within France Location within Hauts-de-France
- Coordinates: 50°16′21″N 2°27′13″E
- Country: France
- Region: Hauts-de-France
- Department: Pas-de-Calais
- Arrondissement: Arras
- Canton: Avesnes-le-Comte
- Intercommunality: CC Campagnes de l'Artois

Government
  - Mayor (2020–2026): Jean-François Haultcoeur
- Area^{1}: 3.36 km^{2} (1.30 sq mi)
- Elevation: 141 m (463 ft)
- Highest elevation: 149 m (489 ft)
- Lowest elevation: 118 m (387 ft)
- Population (2023): 303
  - Density: 90.2/km^{2} (234/sq mi)
- Time zone: UTC+01:00 (CET)
  - Summer (DST): UTC+02:00 (CEST)
- INSEE/Postal code: 62507 /62810
- ^{1} French Land Register data, which excludes lakes, ponds, glaciers > 1 km^{2} (0.386 sq mi or 247 acres) and river estuaries.

Liencourt (French pronunciation: [ljɛ̃kuʁ]) is a commune in the Pas-de-Calais department in the Hauts-de-France region of France 16 miles (26 km) west of Arras.

== Population ==
Historical population
Year	Pop.	±% p.a.
1968	139	—
1975	135	−0.42%
1982	135	+0.00%
1990	208	+5.55%
1999	219	+0.57%
2007	288	+3.48%
2012	279	−0.63%
2017	291	+0.85%
2023	303	+0.68%
Source: INSEE

== See also ==
- Communes of the Pas-de-Calais department
