= Houvin-Houvigneul =

- Commune
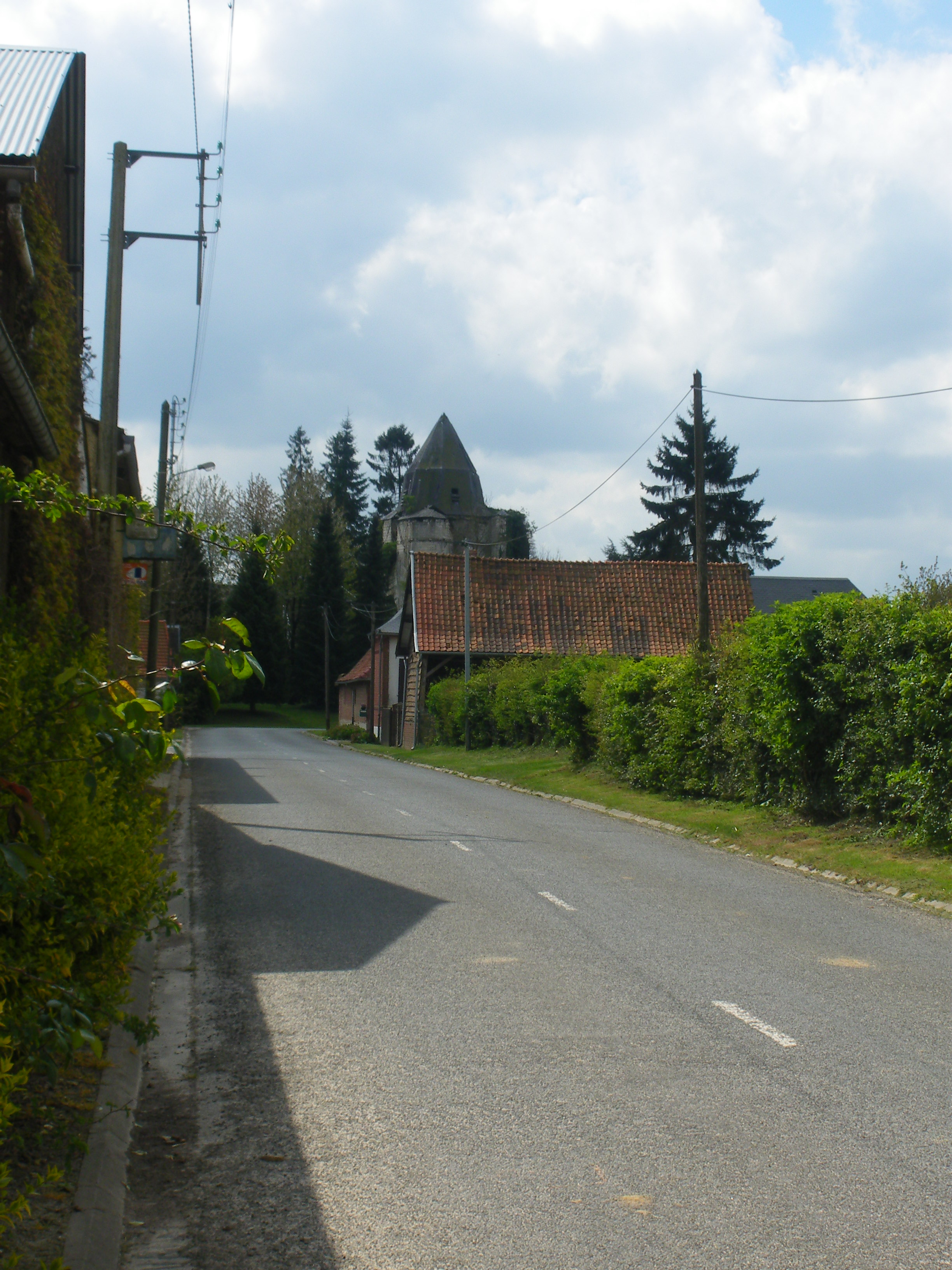
- A road of Houvin-Houvigneul

- Coat of arms
- Location of Houvin-Houvigneul
- Location within France Location within Hauts-de-France
- Coordinates: 50°17′55″N 2°23′07″E
- Country: France
- Region: Hauts-de-France
- Department: Pas-de-Calais
- Arrondissement: Arras
- Canton: Avesnes-le-Comte
- Intercommunality: CC Campagnes de l'Artois

Government
  - Mayor (2024–2026): Ludovic Degouve
- Area^{1}: 8.66 km^{2} (3.34 sq mi)
- Elevation: 143 m (469 ft)
- Highest elevation: 148 m (486 ft)
- Lowest elevation: 108 m (354 ft)
- Population (2023): 247
  - Density: 28.5/km^{2} (73.9/sq mi)
- Time zone: UTC+01:00 (CET)
  - Summer (DST): UTC+02:00 (CEST)
- INSEE/Postal code: 62459 /62270
- ^{1} French Land Register data, which excludes lakes, ponds, glaciers > 1 km^{2} (0.386 sq mi or 247 acres) and river estuaries.

Houvin-Houvigneul (French pronunciation: [uvɛ̃ uviɲœl]) is a commune in the Pas-de-Calais department in the Hauts-de-France region of France 20 miles (32 km) west of Arras. The commune was created in 1856 by merging Houvin and Houvigneul.

== Population ==
Historical population
Year	Pop.	±% p.a.
1968	315	—
1975	266	−2.39%
1982	245	−1.17%
1990	221	−1.28%
1999	201	−1.05%
2007	227	+1.53%
2012	232	+0.44%
2017	232	+0.00%
2023	247	+1.05%
Source: INSEE

== See also ==
- Communes of the Pas-de-Calais department
