= Rebreuviette =

- Commune
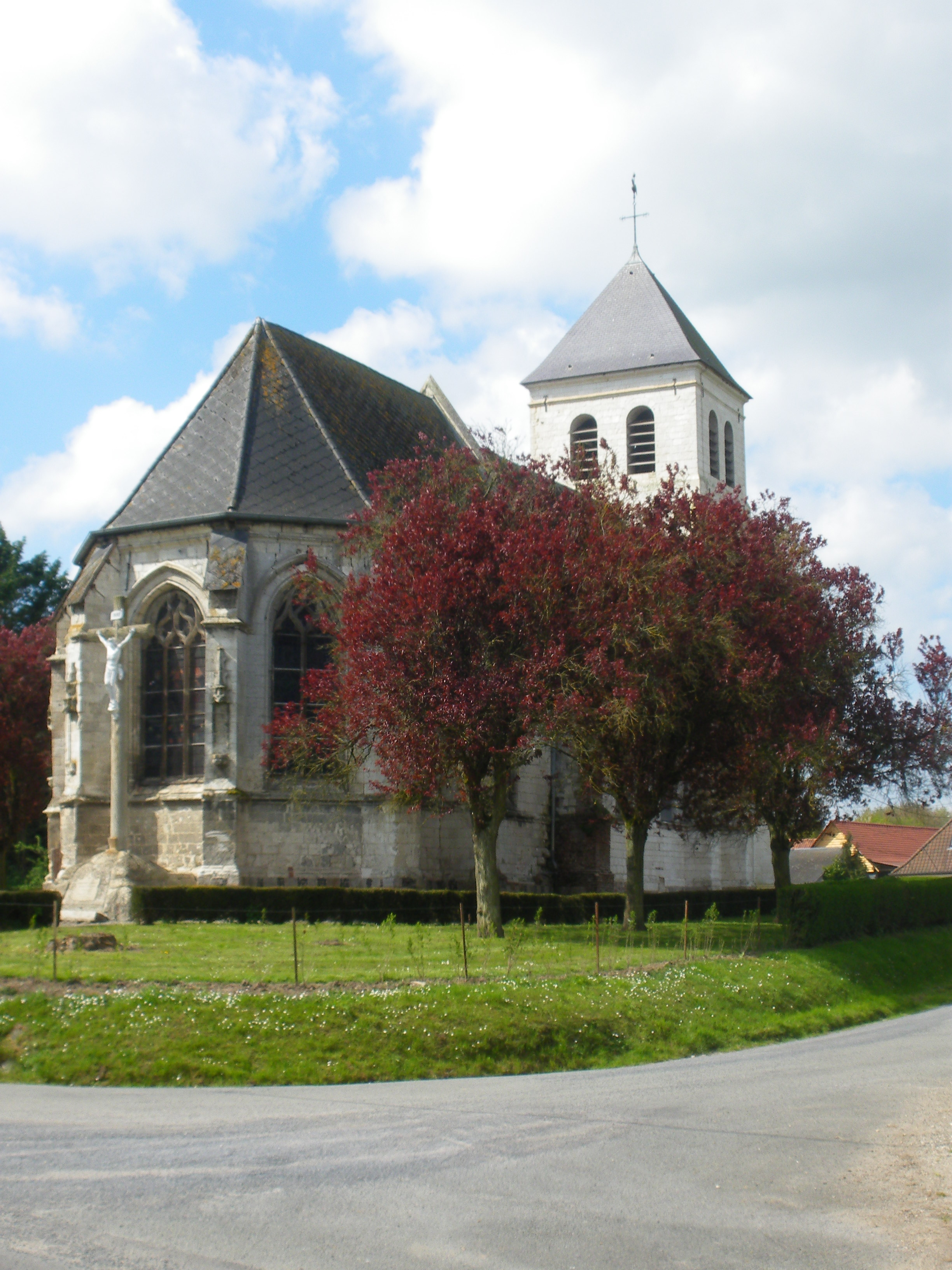
- The church of Rebreuviette

- Coat of arms
- Location of Rebreuviette
- Location within France Location within Hauts-de-France
- Coordinates: 50°15′46″N 2°21′42″E
- Country: France
- Region: Hauts-de-France
- Department: Pas-de-Calais
- Arrondissement: Arras
- Canton: Avesnes-le-Comte
- Intercommunality: CC Campagnes de l'Artois

Government
  - Mayor (2020–2026): François Coquart
- Area^{1}: 8.42 km^{2} (3.25 sq mi)
- Elevation: 85 m (279 ft)
- Highest elevation: 150 m (490 ft)
- Lowest elevation: 77 m (253 ft)
- Population (2023): 253
  - Density: 30.0/km^{2} (77.8/sq mi)
- Time zone: UTC+01:00 (CET)
  - Summer (DST): UTC+02:00 (CEST)
- INSEE/Postal code: 62695 /62270
- ^{1} French Land Register data, which excludes lakes, ponds, glaciers > 1 km^{2} (0.386 sq mi or 247 acres) and river estuaries.

Rebreuviette (French pronunciation: [ʁəbʁœvjɛt]) is a commune in the Pas-de-Calais department in the Hauts-de-France region of France on the banks of the river Canche, 18 miles (29 km) west of Arras.

== Population ==
Historical population
Year	Pop.	±% p.a.
1968	298	—
1975	270	−1.40%
1982	244	−1.44%
1990	248	+0.20%
1999	242	−0.27%
2007	258	+0.80%
2012	280	+1.65%
2017	268	−0.87%
2023	253	−0.96%
Source: INSEE

== See also ==
- Communes of the Pas-de-Calais department
