= Frévillers =

- Commune
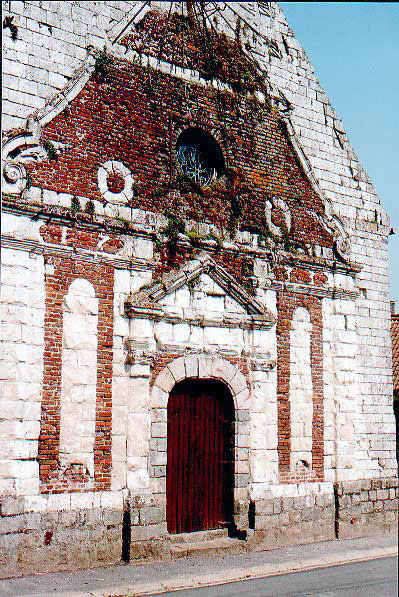
- Entrance to St. Anne’s church

- Coat of arms
- Location of Frévillers
- Location within France Location within Hauts-de-France
- Coordinates: 50°23′50″N 2°31′25″E
- Country: France
- Region: Hauts-de-France
- Department: Pas-de-Calais
- Arrondissement: Arras
- Canton: Avesnes-le-Comte
- Intercommunality: CC Campagnes de l'Artois

Government
  - Mayor (2020–2026): Guy Vasseur
- Area^{1}: 5.07 km^{2} (1.96 sq mi)
- Elevation: 172 m (564 ft)
- Highest elevation: 187 m (614 ft)
- Lowest elevation: 141 m (463 ft)
- Population (2023): 239
  - Density: 47.1/km^{2} (122/sq mi)
- Time zone: UTC+01:00 (CET)
  - Summer (DST): UTC+02:00 (CEST)
- INSEE/Postal code: 62362 /62127
- ^{1} French Land Register data, which excludes lakes, ponds, glaciers > 1 km^{2} (0.386 sq mi or 247 acres) and river estuaries.

Frévillers is a commune in the Pas-de-Calais department in the Hauts-de-France region of France.

== Geography ==
A farming village situated at the highest point in the département, 16 miles (26 km) northwest of Arras, at the junction of the D72 and the D74 roads.

== Population ==
Historical population
Year	Pop.	±% p.a.
1968	235	—
1975	231	−0.24%
1982	226	−0.31%
1990	232	+0.33%
1999	253	+0.97%
2007	242	−0.55%
2012	250	+0.65%
2017	239	−0.90%
2023	239	+0.00%
Source: INSEE

== Places of interest ==
- The church of St. Anne, dating from the eighteenth century.
- Vestiges of an old castle.

== See also ==
- Communes of the Pas-de-Calais department
