= Couturelle =

- Commune
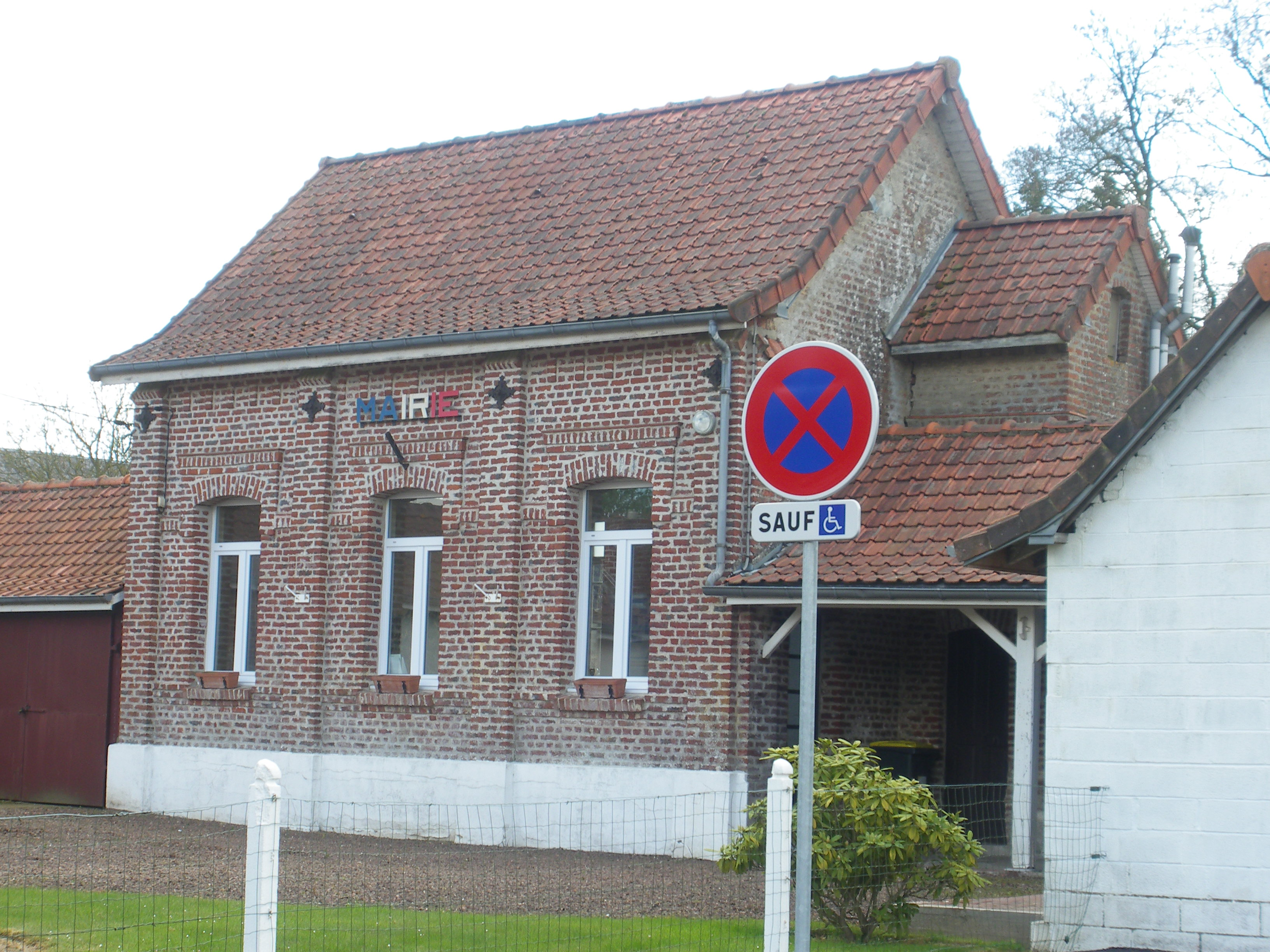
- The town hall of Couturelle

- Coat of arms
- Location of Couturelle
- Location within France Location within Hauts-de-France
- Coordinates: 50°12′33″N 2°30′03″E
- Country: France
- Region: Hauts-de-France
- Department: Pas-de-Calais
- Arrondissement: Arras
- Canton: Avesnes-le-Comte
- Intercommunality: CC Campagnes de l'Artois

Government
  - Mayor (2020–2026): Hugues Legoux
- Area^{1}: 2.1 km^{2} (0.81 sq mi)
- Elevation: 159 m (522 ft)
- Highest elevation: 171 m (561 ft)
- Lowest elevation: 130 m (430 ft)
- Population (2023): 76
  - Density: 36/km^{2} (94/sq mi)
- Time zone: UTC+01:00 (CET)
  - Summer (DST): UTC+02:00 (CEST)
- INSEE/Postal code: 62253 /62158
- ^{1} French Land Register data, which excludes lakes, ponds, glaciers > 1 km^{2} (0.386 sq mi or 247 acres) and river estuaries.

Couturelle (French pronunciation: [kutyʁɛl]) is a commune in the Pas-de-Calais department in the Hauts-de-France region of France.

== Geography ==
A small farming village located 15 miles (25 km) southwest of Arras at the junction of the D25 and D23 roads, on the border with the department of the Somme.

== Population ==
Historical population
Year	Pop.	±% p.a.
1968	126	—
1975	108	−2.18%
1982	102	−0.81%
1990	106	+0.48%
1999	87	−2.17%
2007	95	+1.11%
2012	99	+0.83%
2017	65	−8.07%
2023	76	+2.64%
Source: INSEE

== Places of interest ==
- The church of St.Thomas, dating from the nineteenth century.
- The Commonwealth War Graves Commission cemetery.
- Remains of a 13th-century castle.
- The eighteenth-century chateau.

== See also ==
- Communes of the Pas-de-Calais department
