= Gouves, Pas-de-Calais =

Gouves
- Commune
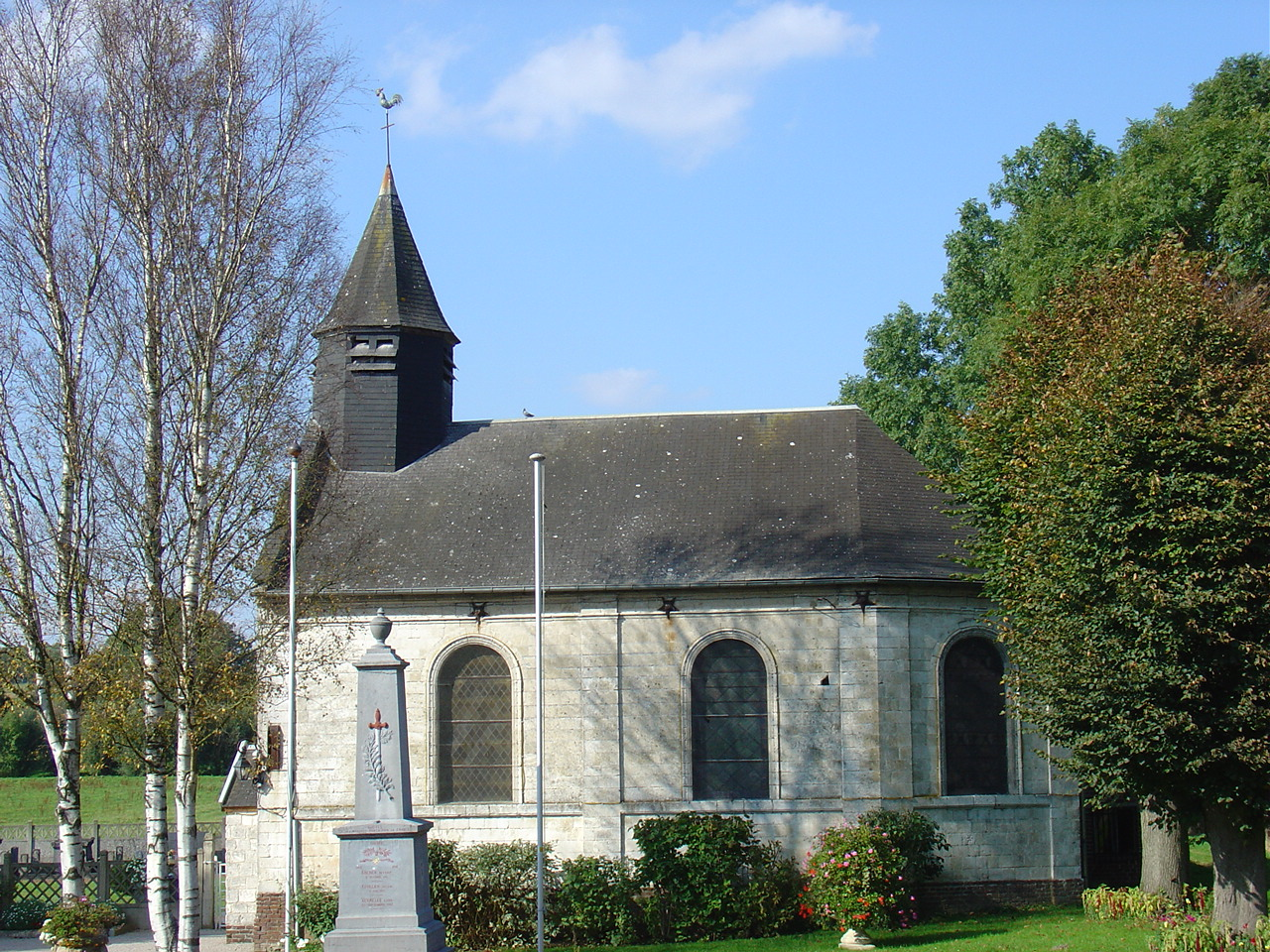
- The church of Gouves

- Coat of arms
- Location of Gouves
- Location within France Location within Hauts-de-France
- Coordinates: 50°17′56″N 2°38′12″E
- Country: France
- Region: Hauts-de-France
- Department: Pas-de-Calais
- Arrondissement: Arras
- Canton: Avesnes-le-Comte
- Intercommunality: CC Campagnes de l'Artois

Government
  - Mayor (2020–2026): Romuald Delattre
- Area^{1}: 2.64 km^{2} (1.02 sq mi)
- Elevation: 75 m (246 ft)
- Highest elevation: 124 m (407 ft)
- Lowest elevation: 72 m (236 ft)
- Population (2023): 195
  - Density: 73.9/km^{2} (191/sq mi)
- Time zone: UTC+01:00 (CET)
  - Summer (DST): UTC+02:00 (CEST)
- INSEE/Postal code: 62378 /62123
- ^{1} French Land Register data, which excludes lakes, ponds, glaciers > 1 km^{2} (0.386 sq mi or 247 acres) and river estuaries.

Gouves (French pronunciation: [ɡuv]) is a commune in the Pas-de-Calais department in the Hauts-de-France region of France 6 miles (9.7 km) west of Arras in the valley of the small river Gy.

== Population ==
Historical population
| Year | Pop. | ±% p.a. |
|---|---|---|
| 1968 | 93 | — |
| 1975 | 95 | +0.30% |
| 1982 | 179 | +9.47% |
| 1990 | 174 | −0.35% |
| 1999 | 198 | +1.45% |
| 2007 | 191 | −0.45% |
| 2012 | 191 | +0.00% |
| 2017 | 197 | +0.62% |
| 2023 | 195 | −0.17% |
Source: INSEE

== See also ==
- Communes of the Pas-de-Calais department
