= Penin =

- Commune
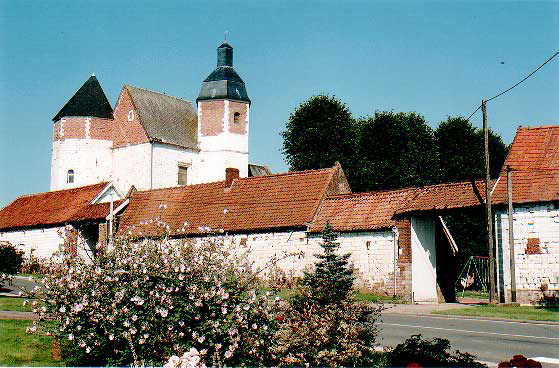
- The chateau of Penin

- Coat of arms
- Location of Penin
- Location within France Location within Hauts-de-France
- Coordinates: 50°19′41″N 2°29′07″E
- Country: France
- Region: Hauts-de-France
- Department: Pas-de-Calais
- Arrondissement: Arras
- Canton: Avesnes-le-Comte
- Intercommunality: CC Campagnes de l'Artois

Government
  - Mayor (2020–2026): Christian Thilliez
- Area^{1}: 9.14 km^{2} (3.53 sq mi)
- Elevation: 133 m (436 ft)
- Highest elevation: 151 m (495 ft)
- Lowest elevation: 108 m (354 ft)
- Population (2023): 458
  - Density: 50.1/km^{2} (130/sq mi)
- Time zone: UTC+01:00 (CET)
  - Summer (DST): UTC+02:00 (CEST)
- INSEE/Postal code: 62651 /62127
- ^{1} French Land Register data, which excludes lakes, ponds, glaciers > 1 km^{2} (0.386 sq mi or 247 acres) and river estuaries.

Penin is a commune in the Pas-de-Calais department in the Hauts-de-France region of France 14 miles (23 km) west of Arras.

== Population ==
Historical population
Year	Pop.	±% p.a.
1968	346	—
1975	330	−0.67%
1982	333	+0.13%
1990	330	−0.11%
1999	356	+0.85%
2007	409	+1.75%
2012	452	+2.02%
2017	474	+0.96%
2023	458	−0.57%
Source: INSEE

== See also ==
- Communes of the Pas-de-Calais department
