= Lignereuil =

- Commune
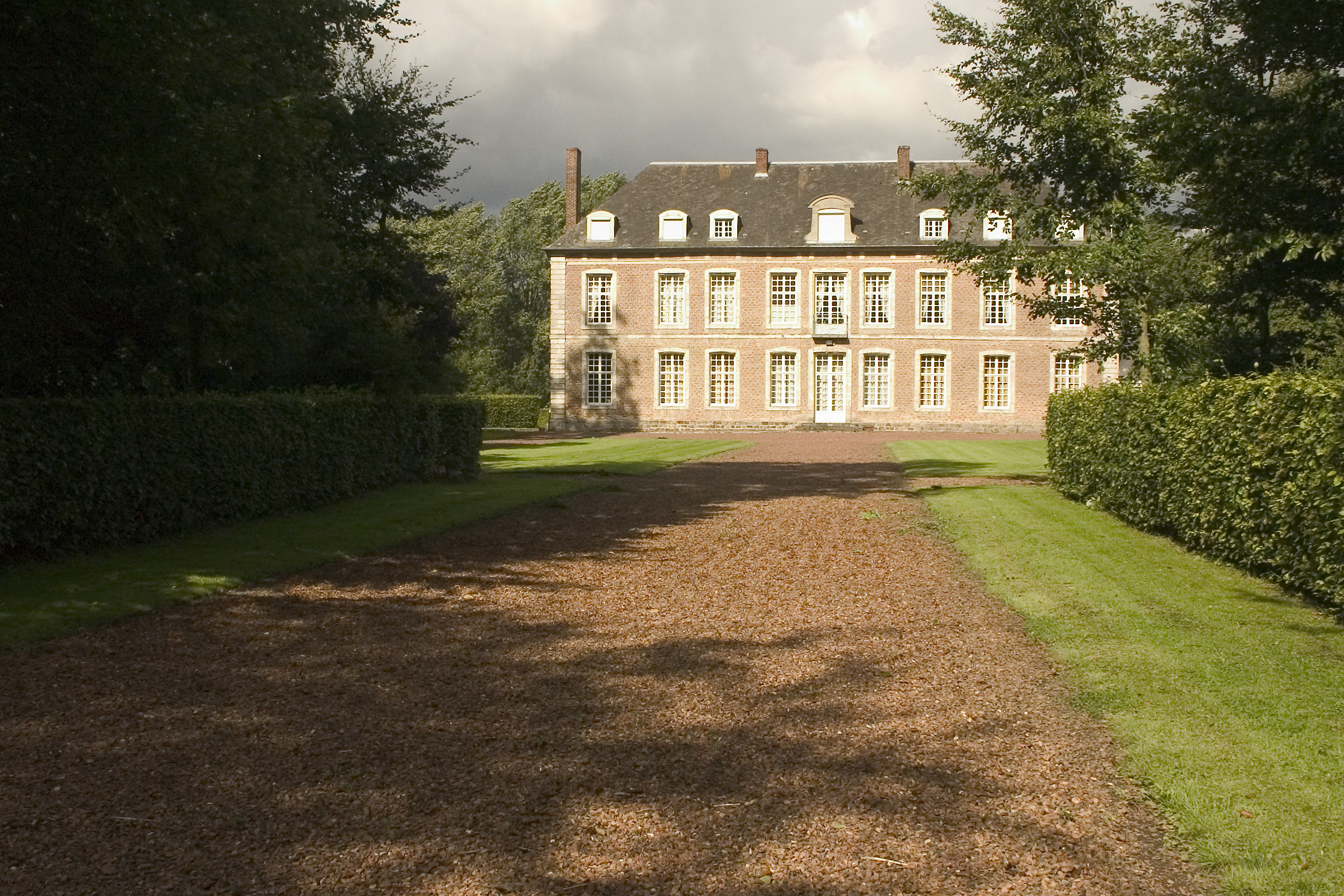
- Château

- Coat of arms
- Location of Lignereuil
- Location within France Location within Hauts-de-France
- Coordinates: 50°17′30″N 2°28′18″E
- Country: France
- Region: Hauts-de-France
- Department: Pas-de-Calais
- Arrondissement: Arras
- Canton: Avesnes-le-Comte
- Intercommunality: Campagnes de l'Artois

Government
  - Mayor (2020–2026): Sylviane Évain
- Area^{1}: 2.92 km^{2} (1.13 sq mi)
- Elevation: 170 m (560 ft)
- Highest elevation: 157 m (515 ft)
- Lowest elevation: 120 m (390 ft)
- Population (2023): 140
  - Density: 48/km^{2} (120/sq mi)
- Demonym(s): Lignereuillois, Lignereuilloises
- Time zone: UTC+01:00 (CET)
  - Summer (DST): UTC+02:00 (CEST)
- INSEE/Postal code: 62511 /62810
- ^{1} French Land Register data, which excludes lakes, ponds, glaciers > 1 km^{2} (0.386 sq mi or 247 acres) and river estuaries.

Lignereuil (French pronunciation: [liɲʁœj]; Picard: Lègnereul) is a commune in the Pas-de-Calais department in the Hauts-de-France region of France 14 miles (23 km) west of Arras.

== Population ==
Historical population
Year	Pop.	±% p.a.
1968	160	—
1975	135	−2.40%
1982	144	+0.93%
1990	149	+0.43%
1999	133	−1.25%
2007	130	−0.28%
2012	150	+2.90%
2017	137	−1.80%
2023	140	+0.36%
Source: INSEE

== See also ==
- Communes of the Pas-de-Calais department
