= Warluzel =

- Commune
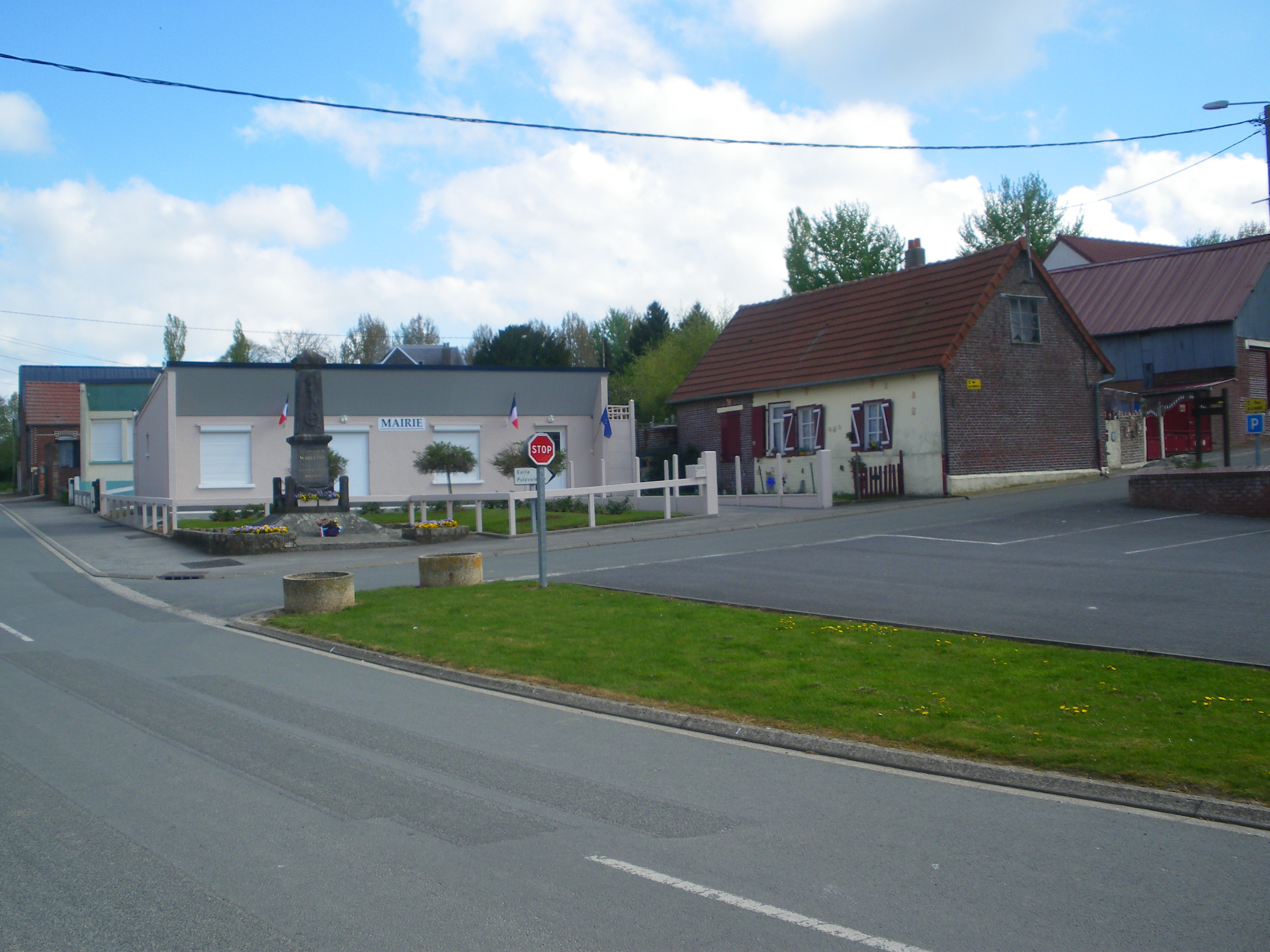
- The centre of Warluzel

- Coat of arms
- Location of Warluzel
- Location within France Location within Hauts-de-France
- Coordinates: 50°13′42″N 2°28′14″E
- Country: France
- Region: Hauts-de-France
- Department: Pas-de-Calais
- Arrondissement: Arras
- Canton: Avesnes-le-Comte
- Intercommunality: Campagnes de l'Artois

Government
  - Mayor (2020–2026): Damien Bricout
- Area^{1}: 4.02 km^{2} (1.55 sq mi)
- Elevation: 153 m (502 ft)
- Highest elevation: 171 m (561 ft)
- Lowest elevation: 126 m (413 ft)
- Population (2023): 218
  - Density: 54.2/km^{2} (140/sq mi)
- Time zone: UTC+01:00 (CET)
  - Summer (DST): UTC+02:00 (CEST)
- INSEE/Postal code: 62879 /62810
- ^{1} French Land Register data, which excludes lakes, ponds, glaciers > 1 km^{2} (0.386 sq mi or 247 acres) and river estuaries.

Warluzel (French pronunciation: [waʁlyzɛl]; Picard: Waluzet) is a commune in the Pas-de-Calais department in the Hauts-de-France region of France about 15 miles (24 km) southwest of Arras, on the border with the department of the Somme.

== Population ==
Historical population
Year	Pop.	±% p.a.
1968	234	—
1975	252	+1.06%
1982	282	+1.62%
1990	267	−0.68%
1999	250	−0.73%
2007	247	−0.15%
2012	247	+0.00%
2017	232	−1.25%
2023	218	−1.03%
Source: INSEE

== See also ==
- Communes of the Pas-de-Calais department
