= Rebreuve-sur-Canche =

- Commune
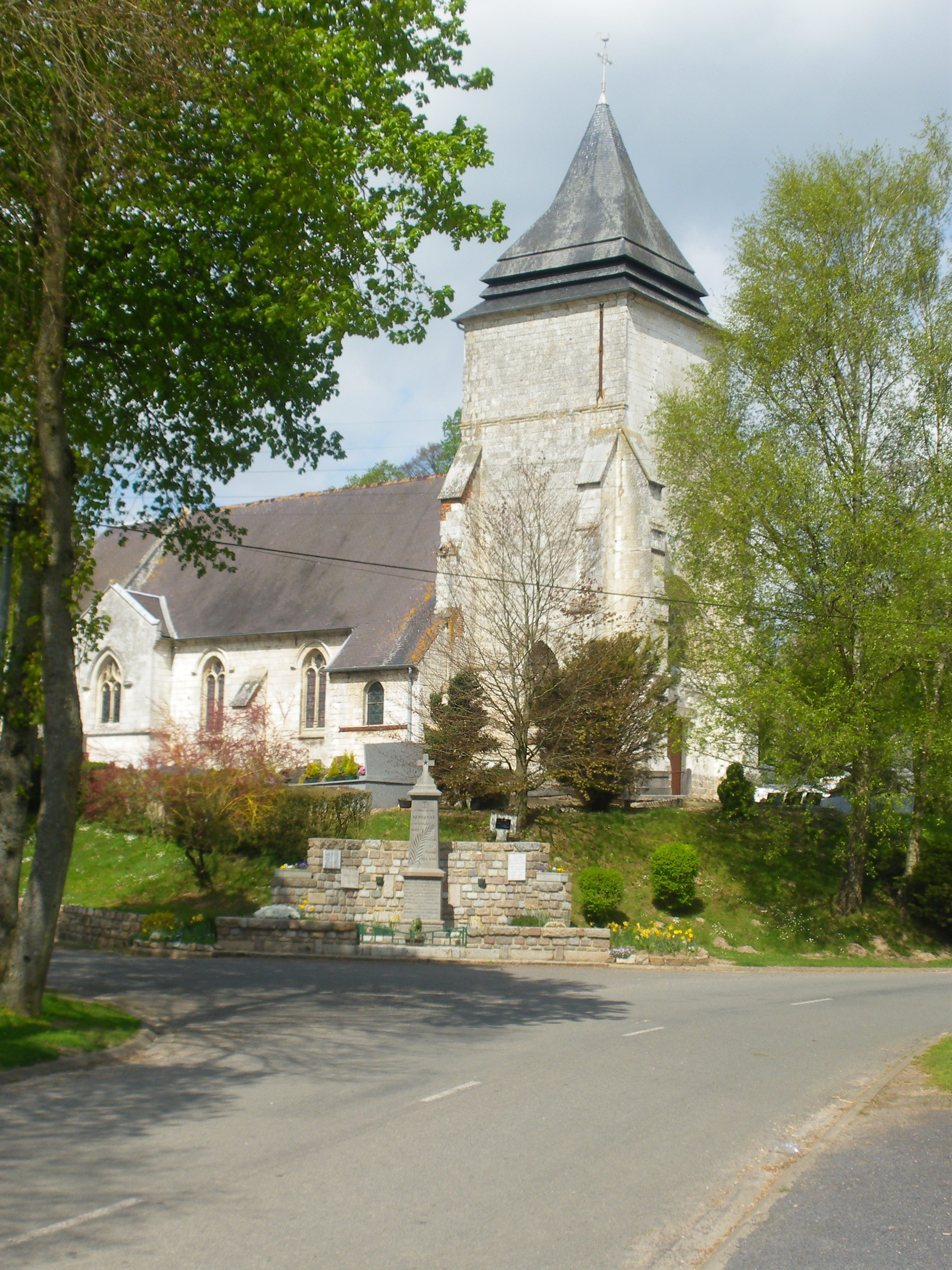
- The church of Rebreuve-sur-Canche

- Coat of arms
- Location of Rebreuve-sur-Canche
- Location within France Location within Hauts-de-France
- Coordinates: 50°15′55″N 2°20′30″E
- Country: France
- Region: Hauts-de-France
- Department: Pas-de-Calais
- Arrondissement: Arras
- Canton: Avesnes-le-Comte
- Intercommunality: CC Campagnes de l'Artois

Government
  - Mayor (2020–2026): Michel Dugarin
- Area^{1}: 8.28 km^{2} (3.20 sq mi)
- Elevation: 76 m (249 ft)
- Highest elevation: 149 m (489 ft)
- Lowest elevation: 72 m (236 ft)
- Population (2023): 190
  - Density: 23/km^{2} (59/sq mi)
- Time zone: UTC+01:00 (CET)
  - Summer (DST): UTC+02:00 (CEST)
- INSEE/Postal code: 62694 /62270
- ^{1} French Land Register data, which excludes lakes, ponds, glaciers > 1 km^{2} (0.386 sq mi or 247 acres) and river estuaries.

Rebreuve-sur-Canche (French pronunciation: [ʁəbʁœv syʁ kɑ̃ʃ], literally Rebreuve on Canche; Picard: Arbreuve-su-Canche) is a commune in the Pas-de-Calais department in the Hauts-de-France region of France.

== Geography ==
Rebreuve-sur-Canche lies on the banks of the river Canche, 19 miles (31 km) west of Arras, at the junction of the D84 and D339 roads.

== Population ==
Historical population
| Year | Pop. | ±% p.a. |
|---|---|---|
| 1968 | 230 | — |
| 1975 | 176 | −3.75% |
| 1982 | 183 | +0.56% |
| 1990 | 199 | +1.05% |
| 1999 | 180 | −1.11% |
| 2007 | 215 | +2.25% |
| 2012 | 209 | −0.56% |
| 2017 | 194 | −1.48% |
| 2023 | 190 | −0.35% |
Source: INSEE

== Places of interest ==
- The church of St.Vaast, dating from the sixteenth century.
- An eighteenth-century manor house.

== See also ==
- Communes of the Pas-de-Calais department
