= Beaudricourt =

- Commune
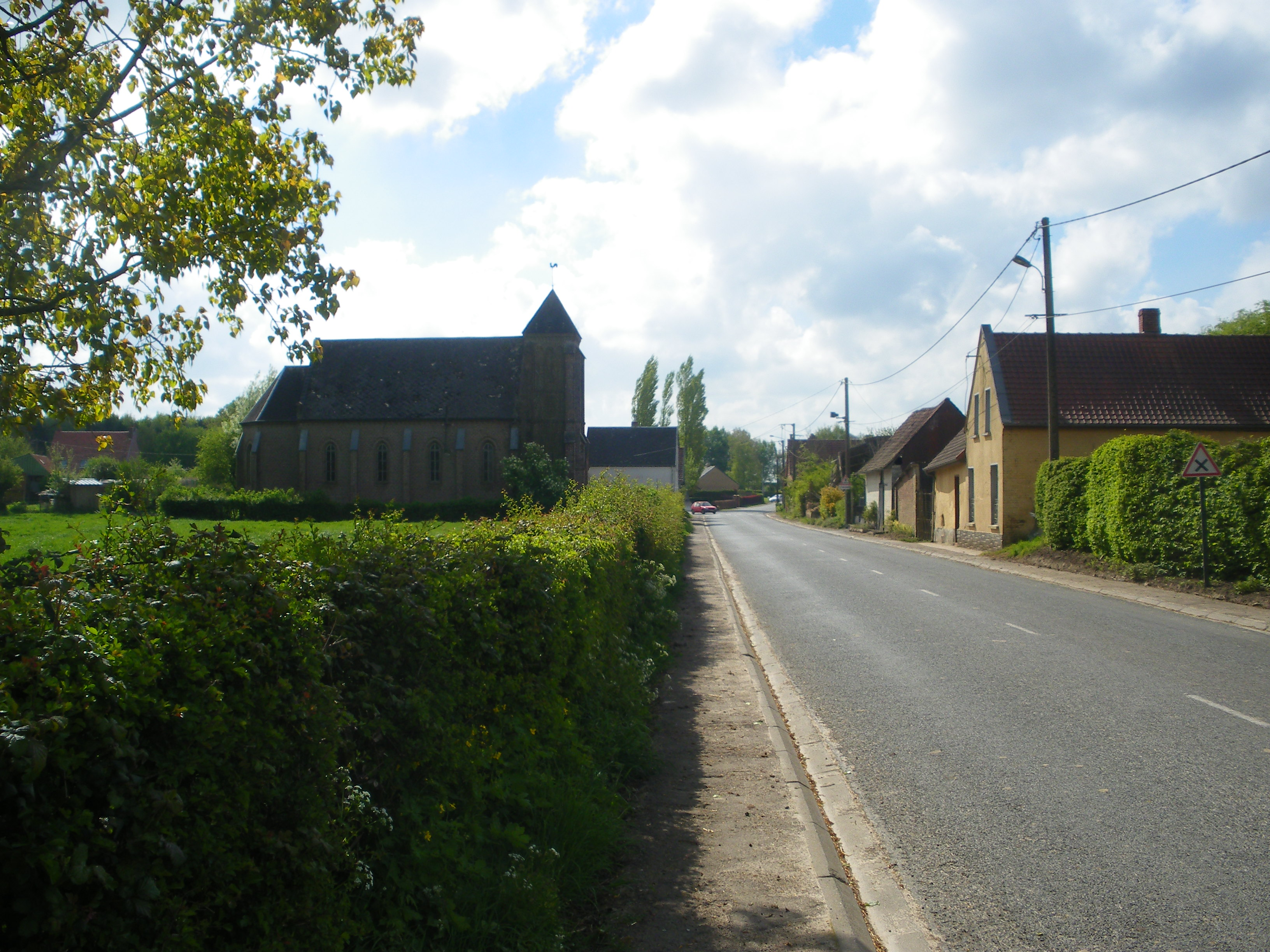
- A general view of Beaudricourt

- Coat of arms
- Location of Beaudricourt
- Location within France Location within Hauts-de-France
- Coordinates: 50°14′55″N 2°24′32″E
- Country: France
- Region: Hauts-de-France
- Department: Pas-de-Calais
- Arrondissement: Arras
- Canton: Avesnes-le-Comte
- Intercommunality: CC Campagnes de l'Artois

Government
  - Mayor (2020–2026): Béatrice Dausse
- Area^{1}: 4.58 km^{2} (1.77 sq mi)
- Elevation: 143 m (469 ft)
- Highest elevation: 159 m (522 ft)
- Lowest elevation: 104 m (341 ft)
- Population (2023): 98
  - Density: 21/km^{2} (55/sq mi)
- Time zone: UTC+01:00 (CET)
  - Summer (DST): UTC+02:00 (CEST)
- INSEE/Postal code: 62091 /62810
- ^{1} French Land Register data, which excludes lakes, ponds, glaciers > 1 km^{2} (0.386 sq mi or 247 acres) and river estuaries.

Beaudricourt (French pronunciation: [bodʁikuʁ]) is a commune in the Pas-de-Calais department in the Hauts-de-France region in northern France.

== Geography ==
A small farming village located 18 miles (28 km) west of Arras on the D23 road.

== Population ==
Historical population
Year	Pop.	±% p.a.
1968	124	—
1975	100	−3.03%
1982	97	−0.43%
1990	92	−0.66%
1999	92	+0.00%
2007	99	+0.92%
2012	98	−0.20%
2017	90	−1.69%
2023	98	+1.43%
Source: INSEE

== Sights ==
- The church, dating from the nineteenth century.

== See also ==
- Communes of the Pas-de-Calais department
