= Coullemont =

- Commune
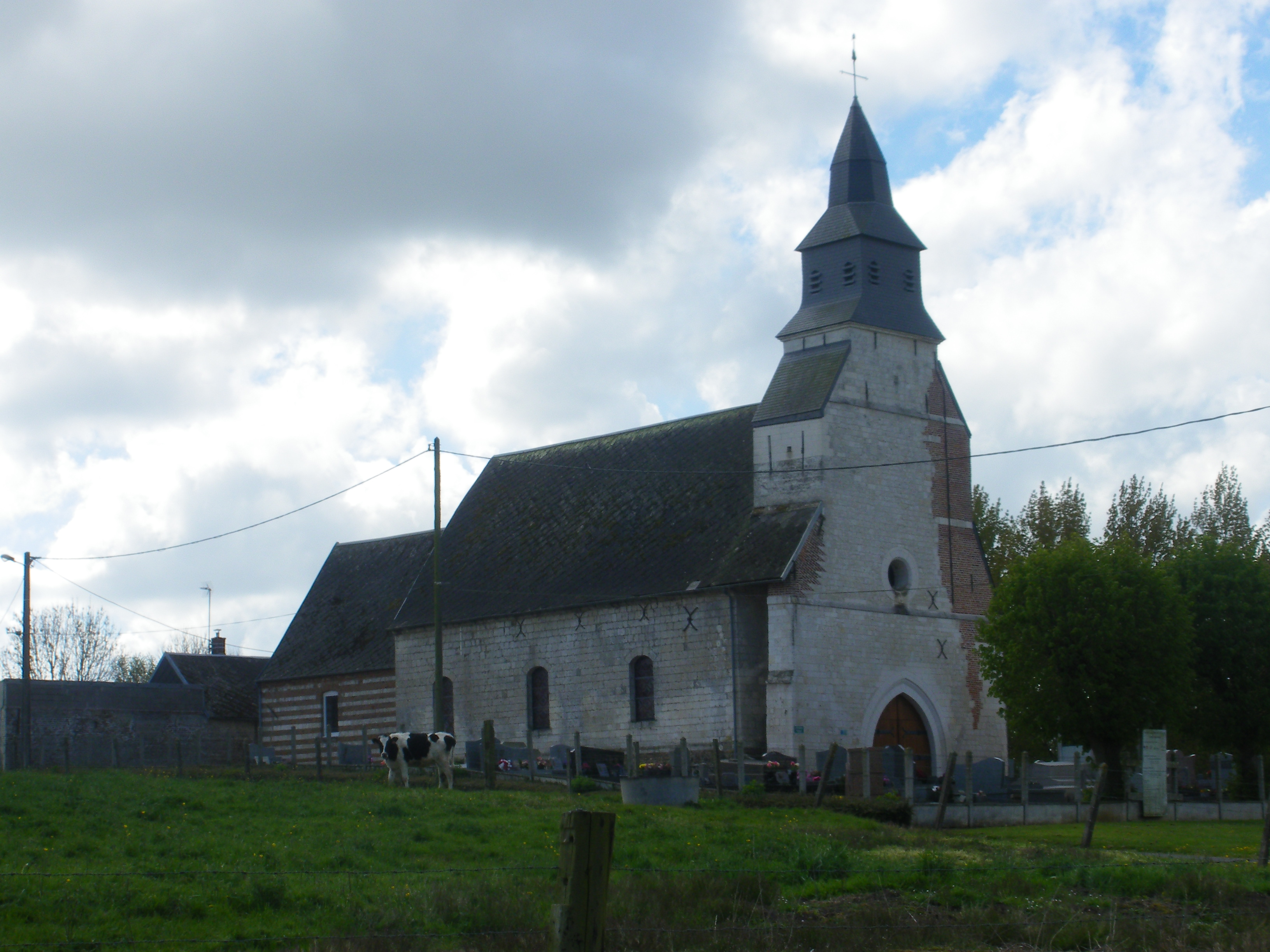
- The church of Coullemont

- Coat of arms
- Location of Coullemont
- Location within France Location within Hauts-de-France
- Coordinates: 50°12′58″N 2°28′30″E
- Country: France
- Region: Hauts-de-France
- Department: Pas-de-Calais
- Arrondissement: Arras
- Canton: Avesnes-le-Comte
- Intercommunality: CC Campagnes de l'Artois

Government
  - Mayor (2020–2026): Patrick Dekeyser
- Area^{1}: 4.04 km^{2} (1.56 sq mi)
- Elevation: 146 m (479 ft)
- Highest elevation: 170 m (560 ft)
- Lowest elevation: 110 m (360 ft)
- Population (2023): 111
  - Density: 27.5/km^{2} (71.2/sq mi)
- Time zone: UTC+01:00 (CET)
  - Summer (DST): UTC+02:00 (CEST)
- INSEE/Postal code: 62243 /62158
- ^{1} French Land Register data, which excludes lakes, ponds, glaciers > 1 km^{2} (0.386 sq mi or 247 acres) and river estuaries.

Coullemont (French pronunciation: [kulmɔ̃]; Picard: Coulonmont) is a commune in the Pas-de-Calais department in the Hauts-de-France region of France.

== Geography ==
A small farming village located 15 miles (24 km) southwest of Arras at the junction of the D23 and D80 roads, on the border with the département of the Somme.

== Population ==
Historical population
Year	Pop.	±% p.a.
1968	103	—
1975	89	−2.07%
1982	86	−0.49%
1990	104	+2.40%
1999	105	+0.11%
2007	109	+0.47%
2012	105	−0.74%
2017	122	+3.05%
2023	111	−1.56%
Source: INSEE

== Toponymy ==
According to the historian Auguste de Loisne, the name of the commune is attested in the following forms: Columnum in 1098; Colummunt in 1102; Fontane, que modo, mutato nomine, Columbe Mons nuncupa[n]tur in 1106; Columnunt in 1136; Colommont and Colunmunt in the 12th century; Colemont in 1239; Colomont in 1249; Collomont and Collomons in 1282; Coulemenc and Coulemons in 1367; Coulemont in 1374; Coullemons in the 14th century; and Coullemont in 1507. The name was recorded as Coulemont in 1793 and has been Coullemont since 1801.

== History ==
During the First World War, in May 1915, soldiers arrived in the commune after being relieved from the front. They stayed there for fifteen days to recover and rebuild their strength, including by receiving reinforcements following losses suffered at the front.

== Places of interest ==
- The church of St.Nicholas, dating from the thirteenth century.
- A Commonwealth War Graves Commission grave.

== See also ==
- Communes of the Pas-de-Calais department
