= Béthonsart =

- Commune
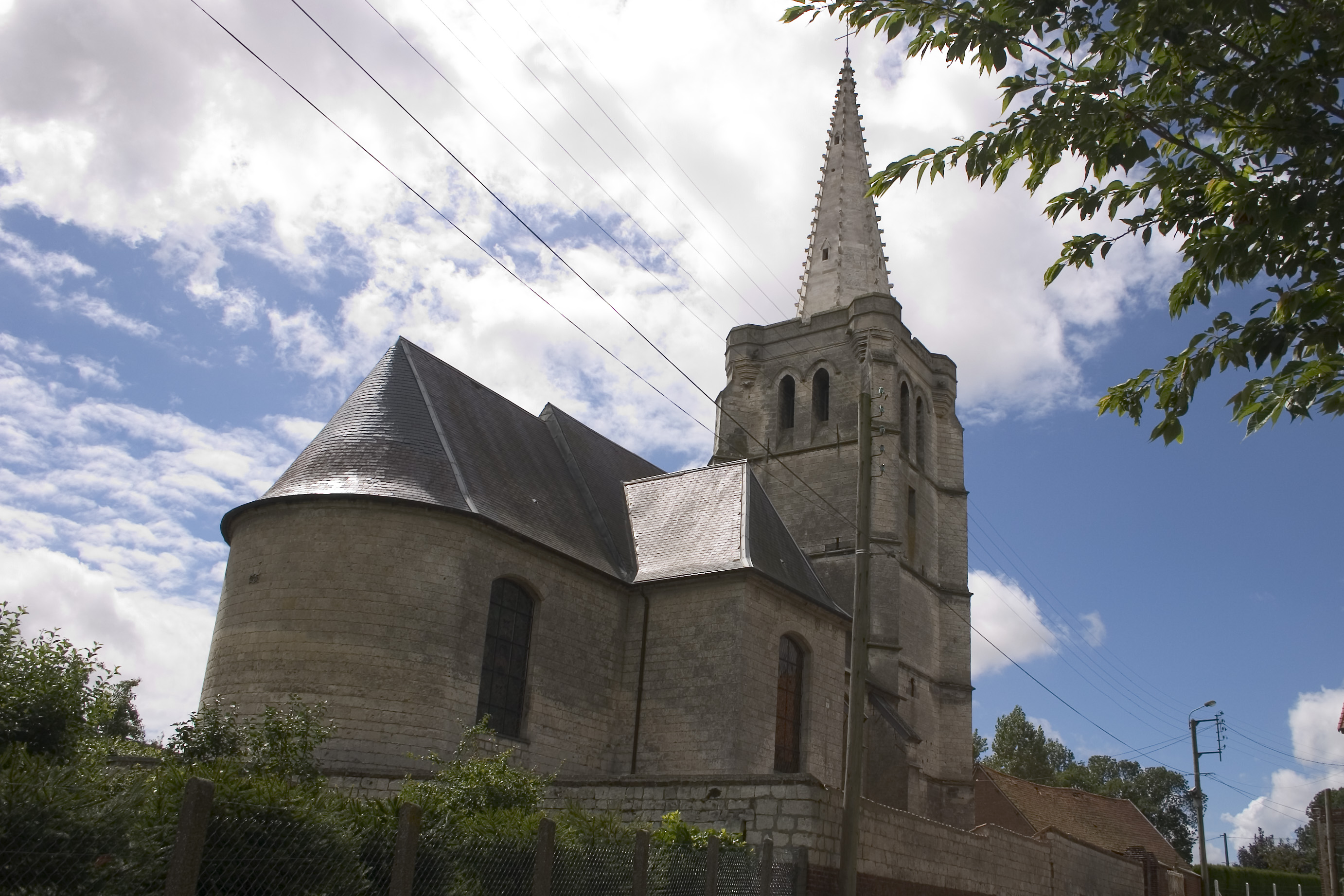
- The church of Béthonsart

- Coat of arms
- Location of Béthonsart
- Location within France Location within Hauts-de-France
- Coordinates: 50°22′36″N 2°33′04″E
- Country: France
- Region: Hauts-de-France
- Department: Pas-de-Calais
- Arrondissement: Arras
- Canton: Avesnes-le-Comte
- Intercommunality: CC Campagnes de l'Artois

Government
  - Mayor (2020–2026): Jean-Marc Cuvillier
- Area^{1}: 4.21 km^{2} (1.63 sq mi)
- Elevation: 144 m (472 ft)
- Highest elevation: 157 m (515 ft)
- Lowest elevation: 119 m (390 ft)
- Population (2023): 155
  - Density: 36.8/km^{2} (95.4/sq mi)
- Time zone: UTC+01:00 (CET)
  - Summer (DST): UTC+02:00 (CEST)
- INSEE/Postal code: 62118 /62690
- ^{1} French Land Register data, which excludes lakes, ponds, glaciers > 1 km^{2} (0.386 sq mi or 247 acres) and river estuaries.

Béthonsart (French pronunciation: [betɔ̃saʁ]) is a commune in the Pas-de-Calais department in the Hauts-de-France region in northern France.

== Geography ==
A small farming village located 12 miles (20 km) northwest of Arras on the D74.

== Population ==
Historical population
Year	Pop.	±% p.a.
1968	152	—
1975	127	−2.53%
1982	126	−0.11%
1990	141	+1.42%
1999	131	−0.81%
2007	163	+2.77%
2012	161	−0.25%
2017	147	−1.80%
2023	155	+0.89%
Source: INSEE

== Sights ==
- A seventeenth-century farmhouse.
- The church of St. Elizabeth, dating from the sixteenth century

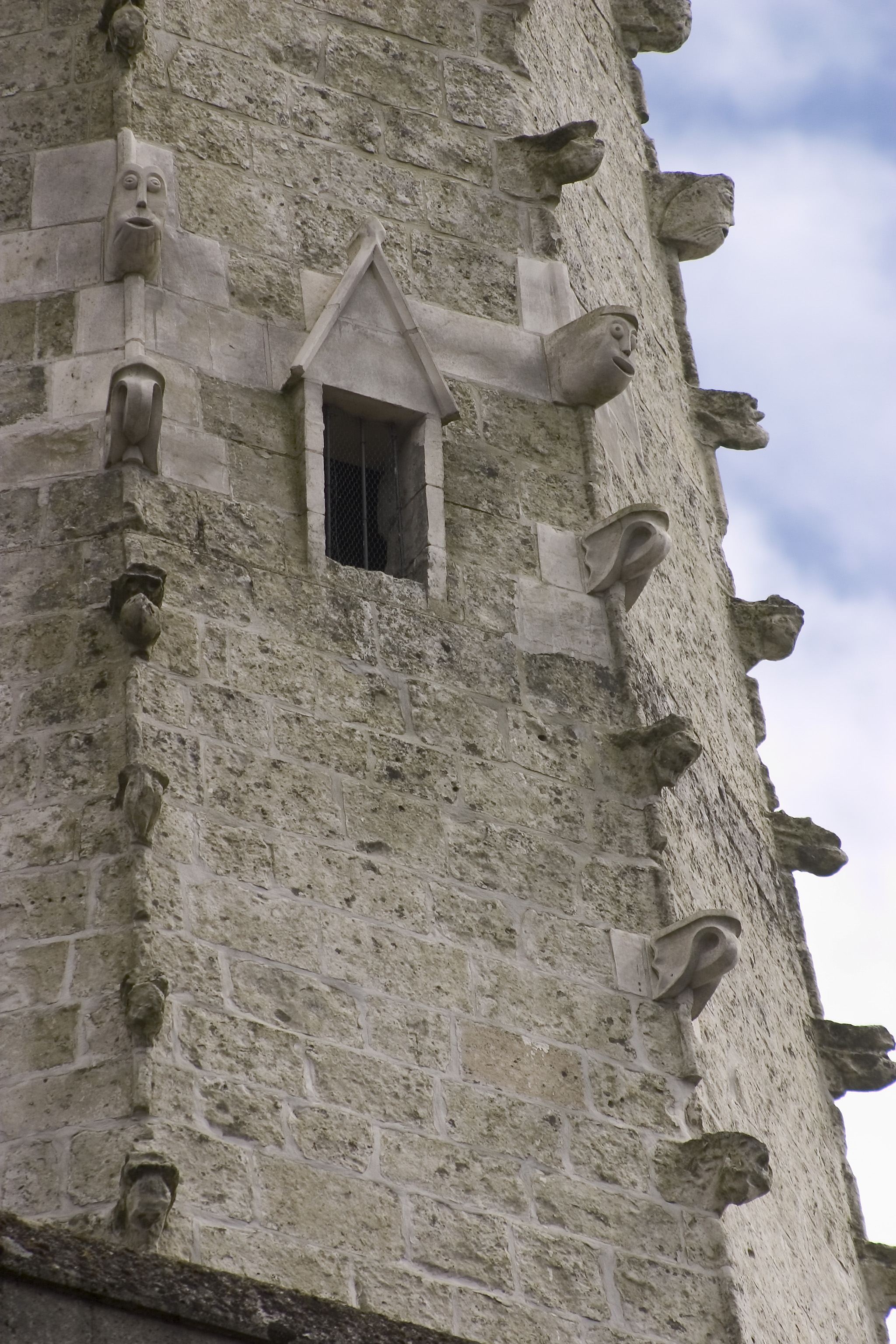
Detail of the spire

== See also ==
- Communes of the Pas-de-Calais department
