= Noyellette =

- Commune
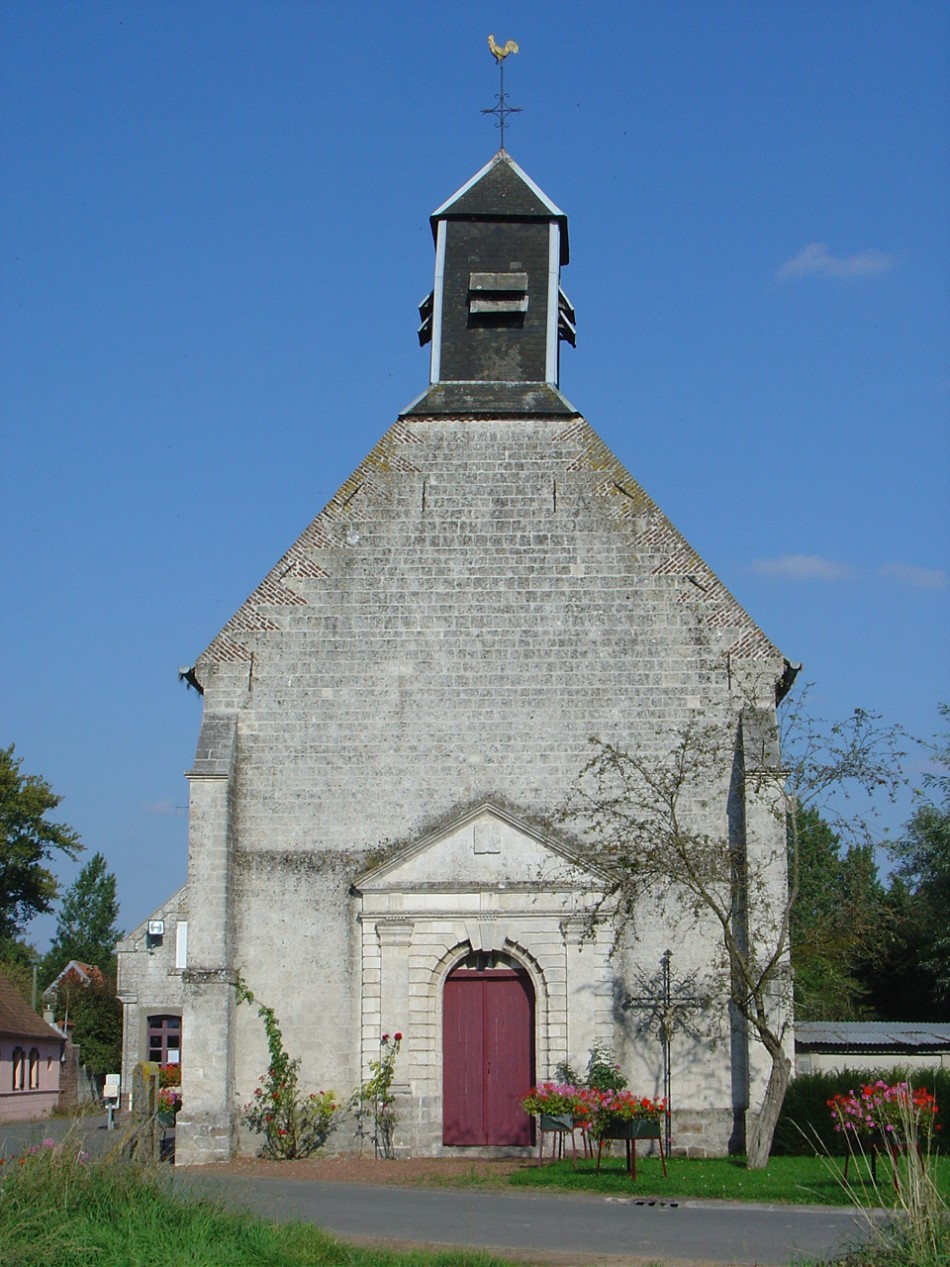
- The church of Noyellette

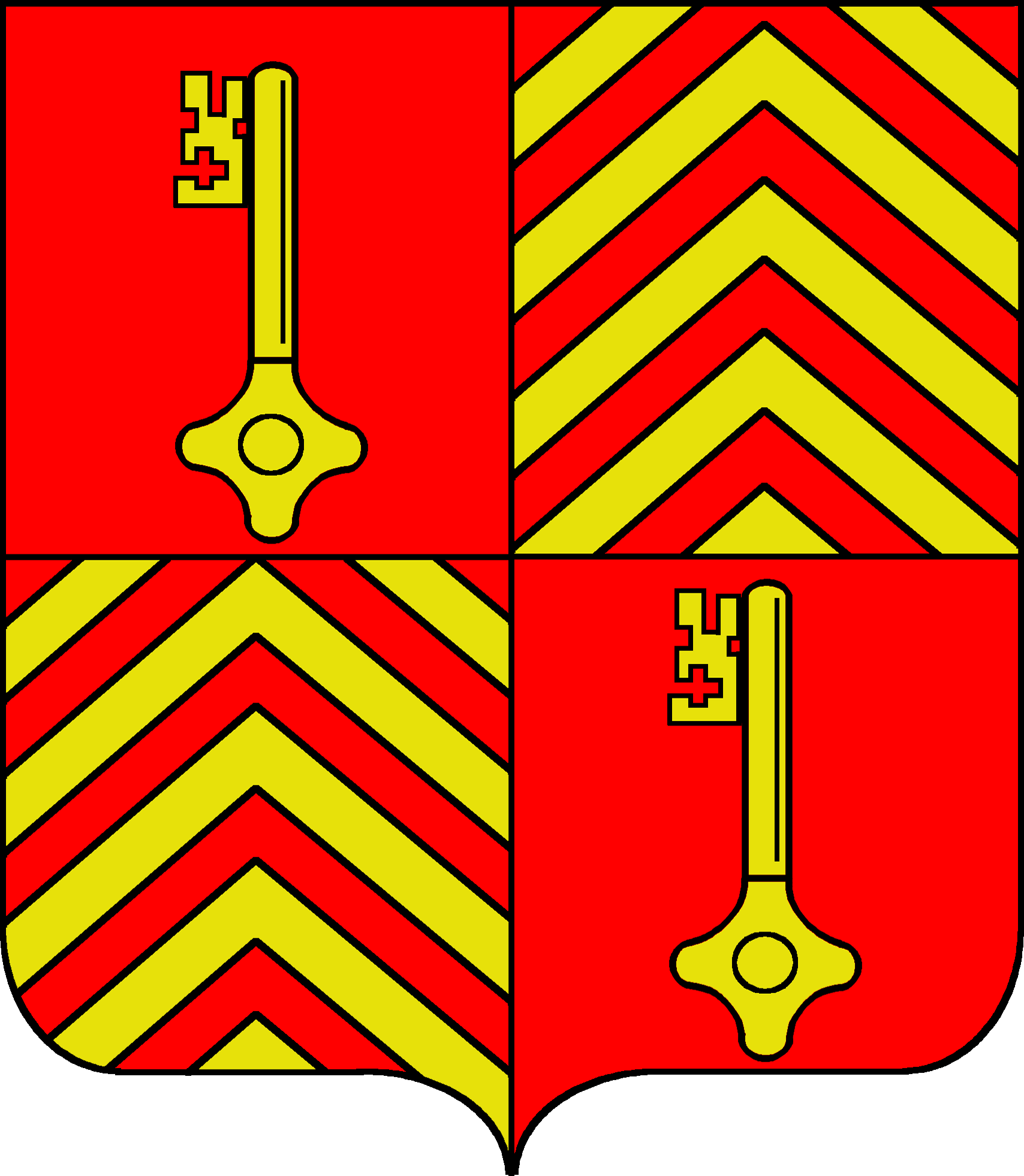
- Coat of arms
- Location of Noyellette
- Location within France Location within Hauts-de-France
- Coordinates: 50°18′04″N 2°35′46″E
- Country: France
- Region: Hauts-de-France
- Department: Pas-de-Calais
- Arrondissement: Arras
- Canton: Avesnes-le-Comte
- Intercommunality: CC Campagnes de l'Artois

Government
  - Mayor (2023–2026): Anne-Sophie Lariviere
- Area^{1}: 2.02 km^{2} (0.78 sq mi)
- Elevation: 94 m (308 ft)
- Highest elevation: 122 m (400 ft)
- Lowest elevation: 83 m (272 ft)
- Population (2023): 154
  - Density: 76.2/km^{2} (197/sq mi)
- Time zone: UTC+01:00 (CET)
  - Summer (DST): UTC+02:00 (CEST)
- INSEE/Postal code: 62629 /62123
- ^{1} French Land Register data, which excludes lakes, ponds, glaciers > 1 km^{2} (0.386 sq mi or 247 acres) and river estuaries.

Noyellette is a commune in the Pas-de-Calais department in the Hauts-de-France region of France.

== Geography ==
Noyelette is situated 7 miles (11 km) west of Arras, on the D339 road.

== Population ==
Historical population
Year	Pop.	±% p.a.
1968	104	—
1975	102	−0.28%
1982	155	+6.16%
1990	194	+2.85%
1999	183	−0.65%
2007	181	−0.14%
2012	181	+0.00%
2017	173	−0.90%
2023	154	−1.92%
Source: INSEE

== Places of interest ==
- The church of St.Pierre, dating from the eighteenth century.

== See also ==
- Communes of the Pas-de-Calais department
