= Le Souich =

- Commune
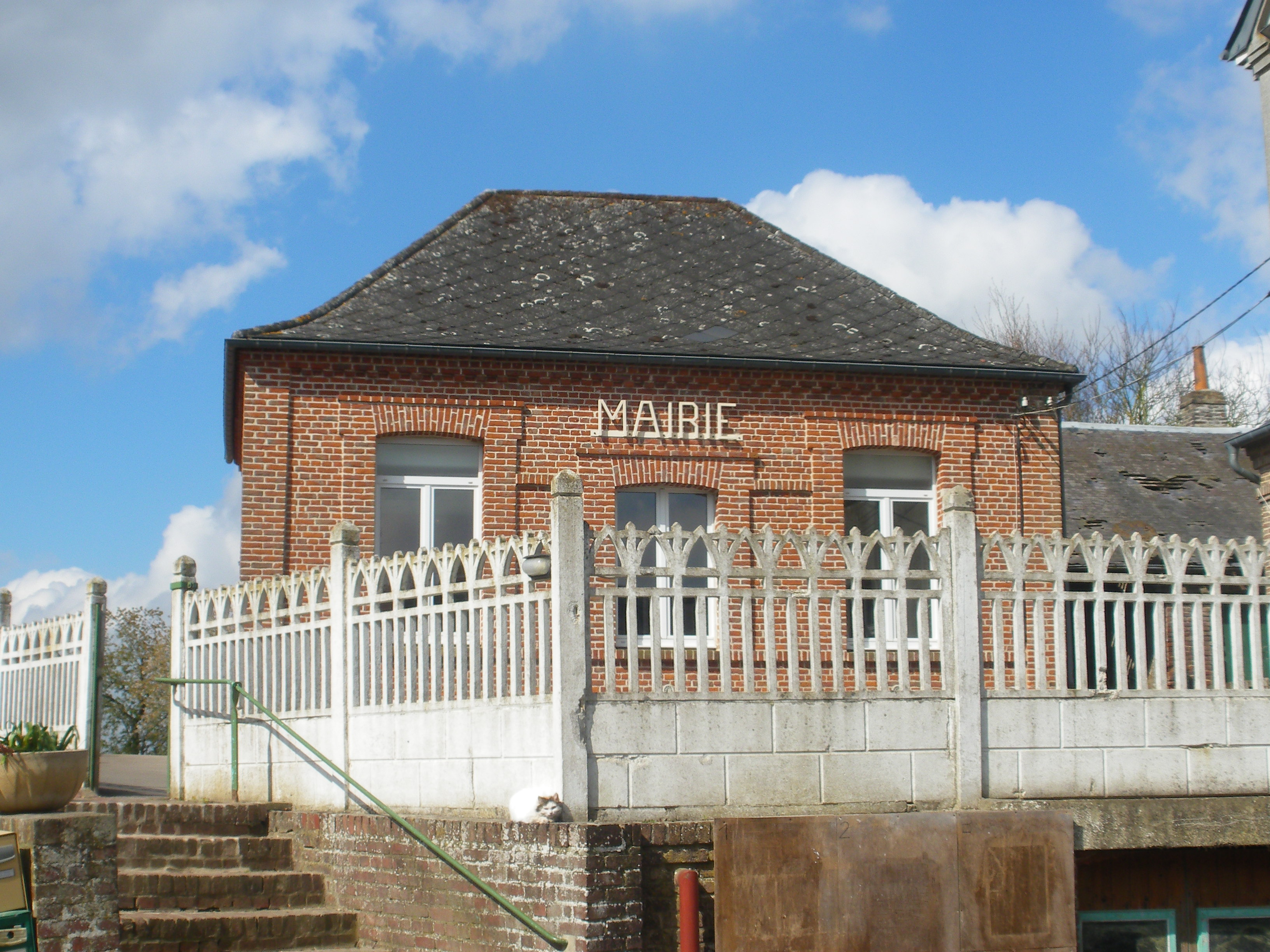
- The town hall of Le Souich

- Coat of arms
- Location of Le Souich
- Location within France Location within Hauts-de-France
- Coordinates: 50°13′25″N 2°22′04″E
- Country: France
- Region: Hauts-de-France
- Department: Pas-de-Calais
- Arrondissement: Arras
- Canton: Avesnes-le-Comte
- Intercommunality: CC Campagnes de l'Artois

Government
  - Mayor (2020–2026): René Pruvost
- Area^{1}: 5.11 km^{2} (1.97 sq mi)
- Elevation: 153 m (502 ft)
- Highest elevation: 161 m (528 ft)
- Lowest elevation: 112 m (367 ft)
- Population (2023): 197
  - Density: 38.6/km^{2} (99.8/sq mi)
- Time zone: UTC+01:00 (CET)
  - Summer (DST): UTC+02:00 (CEST)
- INSEE/Postal code: 62802 /62810
- ^{1} French Land Register data, which excludes lakes, ponds, glaciers > 1 km^{2} (0.386 sq mi or 247 acres) and river estuaries.

Le Souich (French pronunciation: [lə swiʃ]; Picard: Aussouy) is a commune in the Pas-de-Calais department in the Hauts-de-France region of France.

== Geography ==
Le Souich is situated 23 miles (37 km) southwest of Arras, at the junction of the D59 and the D257 roads, on the border with the department of the Somme.

== Population ==
Historical population
Year	Pop.	±% p.a.
1968	213	—
1975	173	−2.93%
1982	158	−1.29%
1990	155	−0.24%
1999	169	+0.97%
2007	186	+1.21%
2012	181	−0.54%
2017	154	−3.18%
2023	197	+4.19%
Source: INSEE

== See also ==
- Communes of the Pas-de-Calais department
