= Ivergny =

- Commune
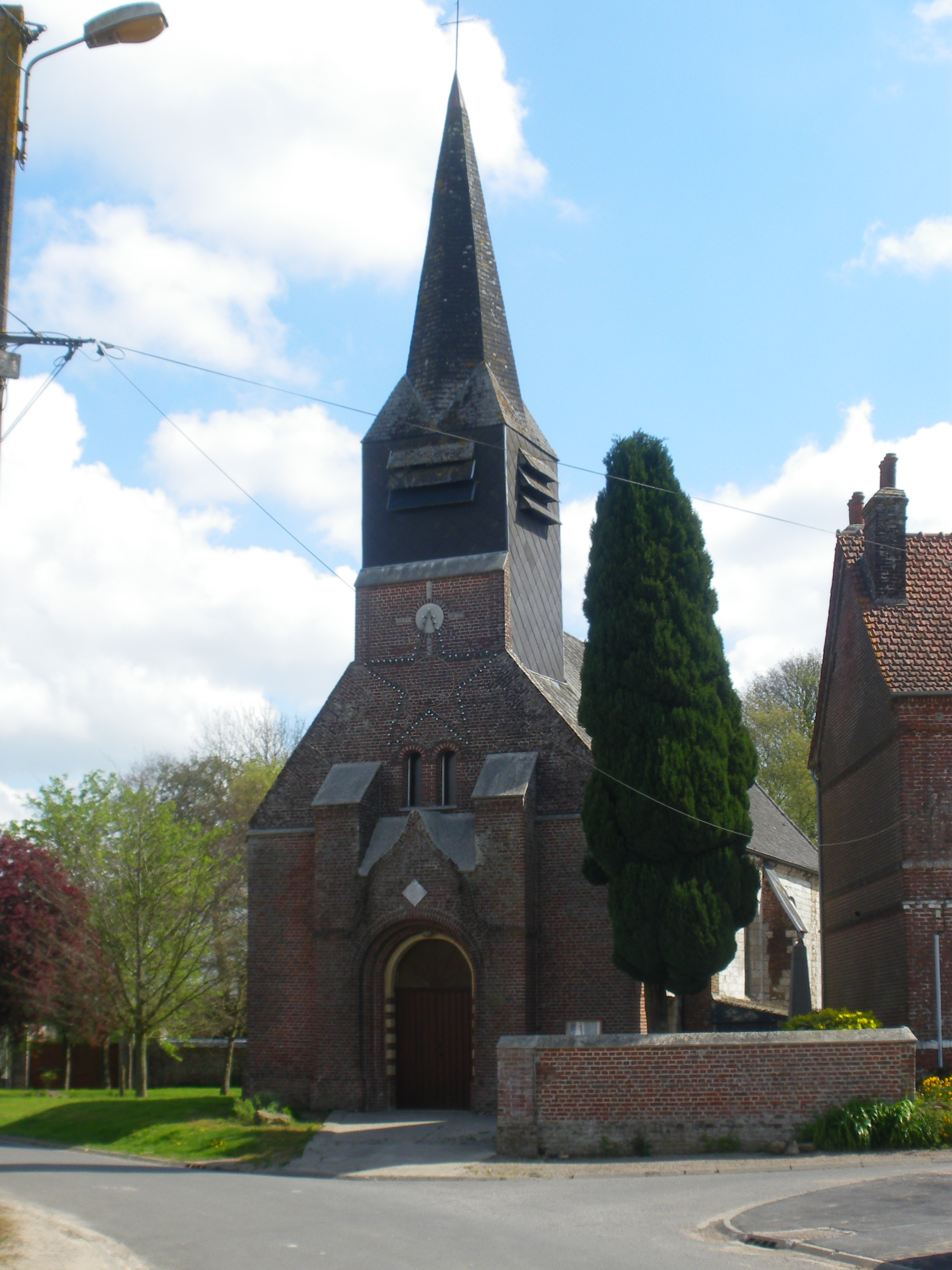
- The church of Ivergny

- Coat of arms
- Location of Ivergny
- Location within France Location within Hauts-de-France
- Coordinates: 50°14′23″N 2°23′36″E
- Country: France
- Region: Hauts-de-France
- Department: Pas-de-Calais
- Arrondissement: Arras
- Canton: Avesnes-le-Comte
- Intercommunality: CC Campagnes de l'Artois

Government
  - Mayor (2020–2026): Jean-Claude Jacquemelle
- Area^{1}: 7.34 km^{2} (2.83 sq mi)
- Elevation: 150 m (490 ft)
- Highest elevation: 159 m (522 ft)
- Lowest elevation: 109 m (358 ft)
- Population (2023): 238
  - Density: 32.4/km^{2} (84.0/sq mi)
- Time zone: UTC+01:00 (CET)
  - Summer (DST): UTC+02:00 (CEST)
- INSEE/Postal code: 62475 /62810
- ^{1} French Land Register data, which excludes lakes, ponds, glaciers > 1 km^{2} (0.386 sq mi or 247 acres) and river estuaries.

Ivergny (French pronunciation: [ivɛʁɲi]) is a commune in the Pas-de-Calais department in northern France. It is located approximately 40 km north of Amiens.

== See also ==
- Communes of the Pas-de-Calais department
