= Estrée-Wamin =

- Commune
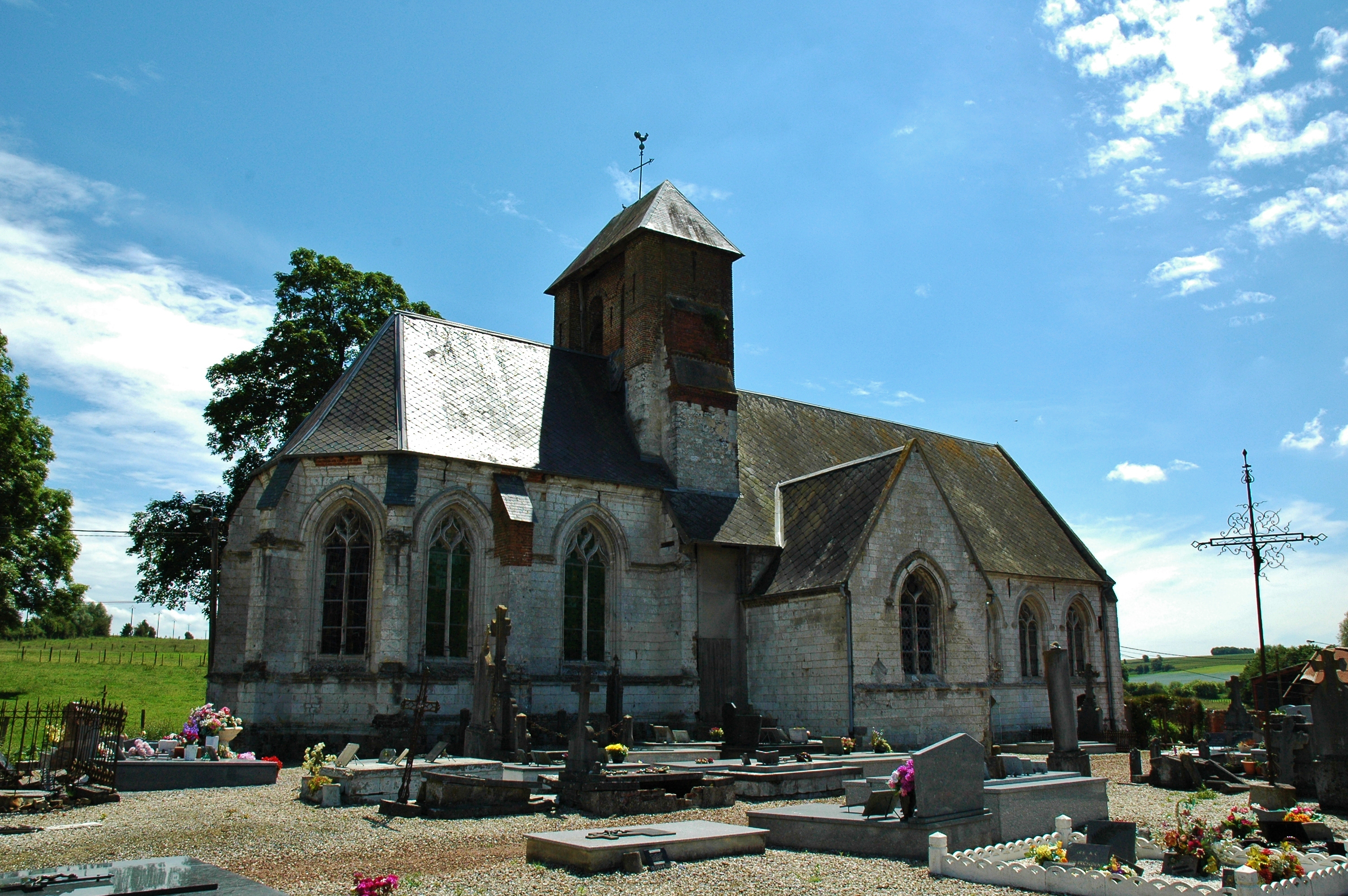
- The church of Estrée-Wamin

- Coat of arms
- Location of Estrée-Wamin
- Location within France Location within Hauts-de-France
- Coordinates: 50°16′22″N 2°24′14″E
- Country: France
- Region: Hauts-de-France
- Department: Pas-de-Calais
- Arrondissement: Arras
- Canton: Avesnes-le-Comte
- Intercommunality: CC Campagnes de l'Artois

Government
  - Mayor (2020–2026): Arnauld Ricq
- Area^{1}: 5.2 km^{2} (2.0 sq mi)
- Elevation: 92 m (302 ft)
- Highest elevation: 147 m (482 ft)
- Lowest elevation: 82 m (269 ft)
- Population (2023): 224
  - Density: 43/km^{2} (110/sq mi)
- Time zone: UTC+01:00 (CET)
  - Summer (DST): UTC+02:00 (CEST)
- INSEE/Postal code: 62316 /62810
- ^{1} French Land Register data, which excludes lakes, ponds, glaciers > 1 km^{2} (0.386 sq mi or 247 acres) and river estuaries.

Estrée-Wamin is a commune in the Pas-de-Calais department in the Hauts-de-France region of France 20 miles (32 km) west of Arras.

== Population ==
Historical population
Year	Pop.	±% p.a.
1968	235	—
1975	206	−1.86%
1982	183	−1.68%
1990	168	−1.06%
1999	184	+1.02%
2007	156	−2.04%
2012	173	+2.09%
2017	172	−0.12%
2023	224	+4.50%
Source: INSEE

== See also ==
- Communes of the Pas-de-Calais department
