= Canettemont =

- Commune
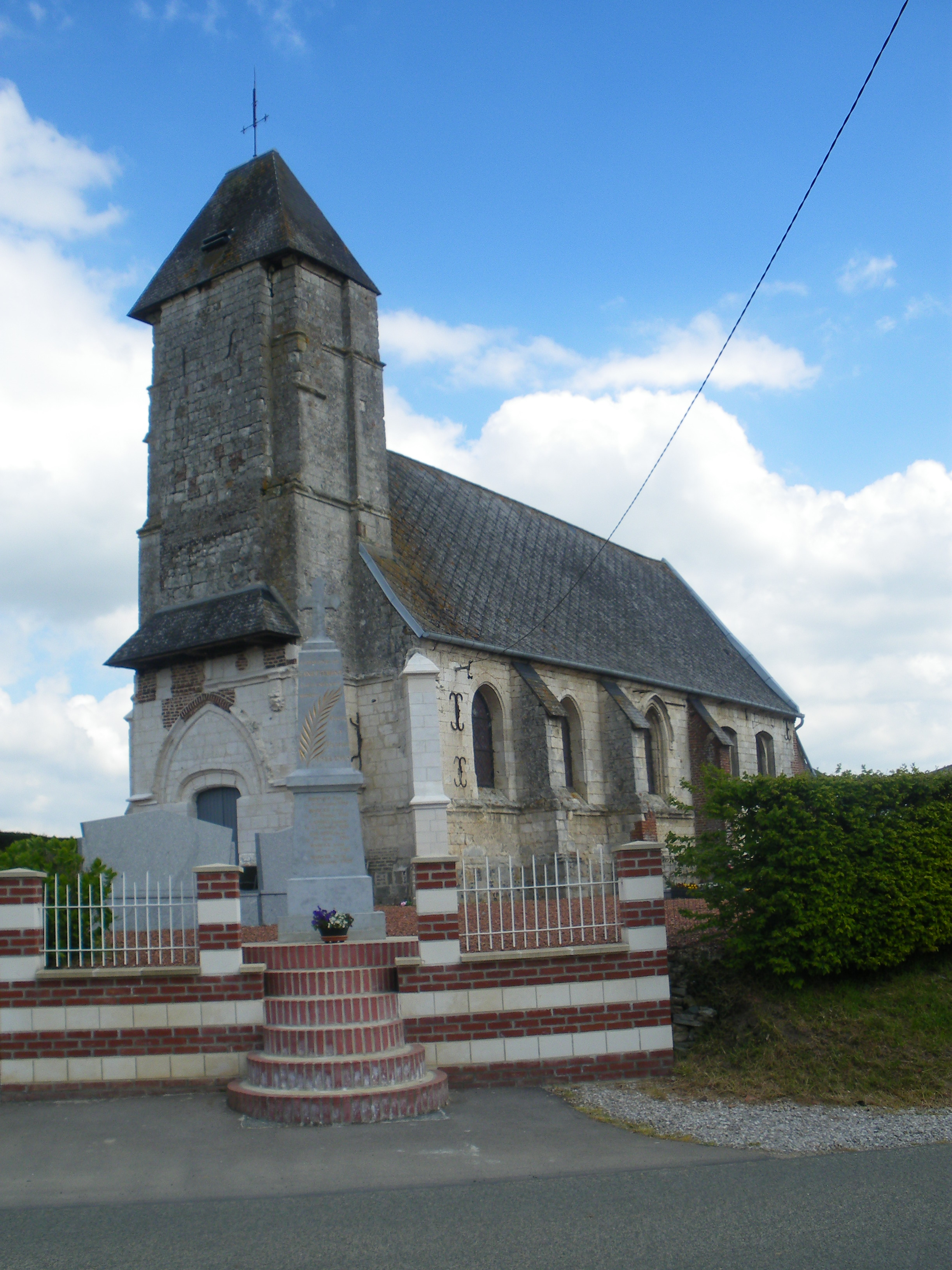
- The church of Canettemont

- Coat of arms
- Location of Canettemont
- Location within France Location within Hauts-de-France
- Coordinates: 50°16′43″N 2°21′59″E
- Country: France
- Region: Hauts-de-France
- Department: Pas-de-Calais
- Arrondissement: Arras
- Canton: Avesnes-le-Comte
- Intercommunality: CC Campagnes de l'Artois

Government
  - Mayor (2020–2026): Christian Boucly
- Area^{1}: 1.79 km^{2} (0.69 sq mi)
- Elevation: 145 m (476 ft)
- Highest elevation: 149 m (489 ft)
- Lowest elevation: 110 m (360 ft)
- Population (2023): 66
  - Density: 37/km^{2} (95/sq mi)
- Time zone: UTC+01:00 (CET)
  - Summer (DST): UTC+02:00 (CEST)
- INSEE/Postal code: 62208 /62270
- ^{1} French Land Register data, which excludes lakes, ponds, glaciers > 1 km^{2} (0.386 sq mi or 247 acres) and river estuaries.

Canettemont (French pronunciation: [kanɛtmɔ̃]) is a commune in the Pas-de-Calais department in the Hauts-de-France region of France.

== Geography ==
A small farming village located 20 miles (32 km) west of Arras at the junction of the D53 with the D84.

== Population ==
Historical population
Year	Pop.	±% p.a.
1968	65	—
1975	60	−1.14%
1982	57	−0.73%
1990	67	+2.04%
1999	61	−1.04%
2007	60	−0.21%
2012	68	+2.53%
2017	70	+0.58%
2023	66	−0.98%
Source: INSEE

== Places of interest ==
- The church of Notre-Dame dates from the sixteenth century.

== See also ==
- Communes of the Pas-de-Calais department
