= Montenescourt =

- Commune
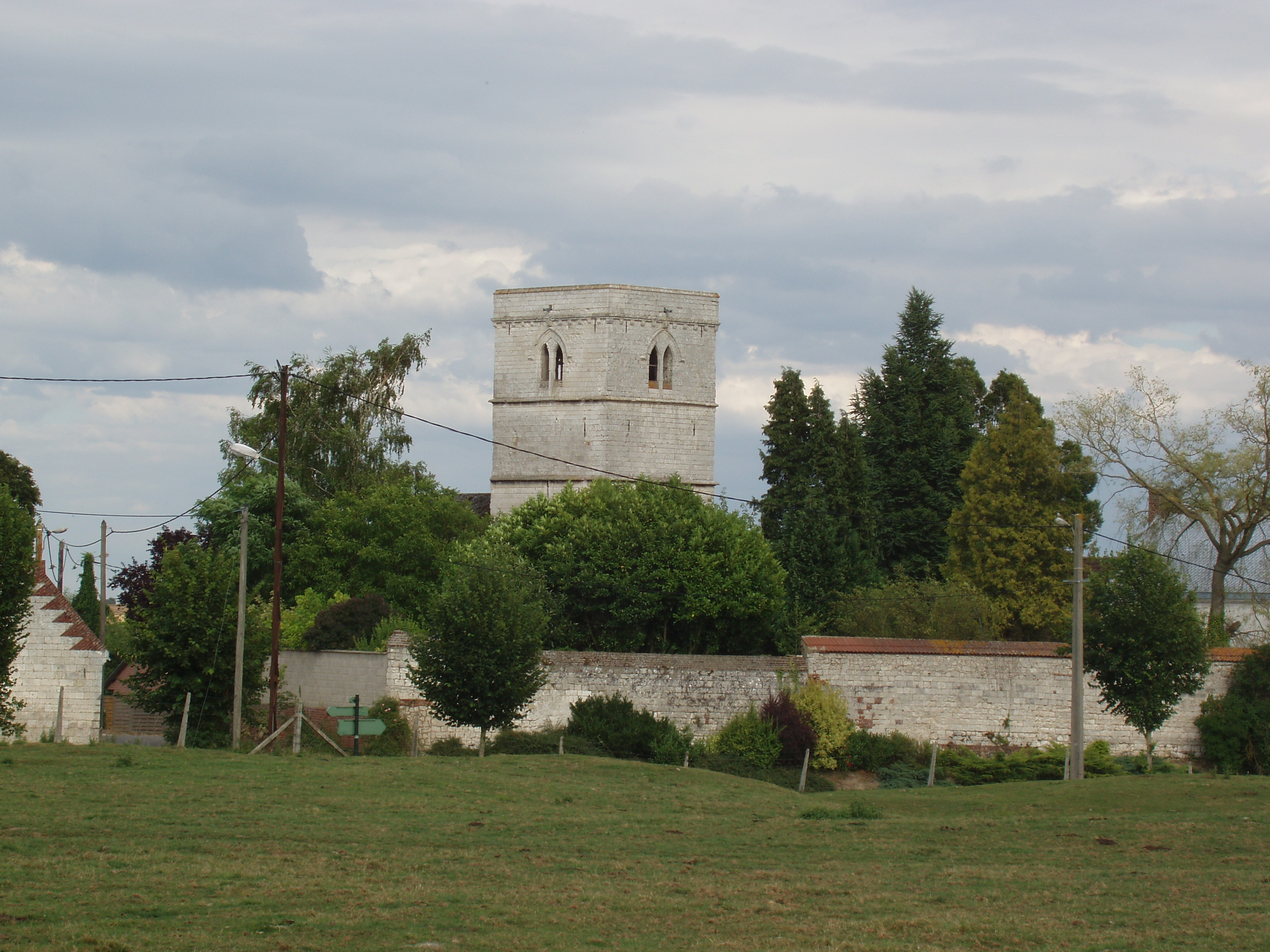
- The church of Montenescourt

- Coat of arms
- Location of Montenescourt
- Location within France Location within Hauts-de-France
- Coordinates: 50°17′36″N 2°37′31″E
- Country: France
- Region: Hauts-de-France
- Department: Pas-de-Calais
- Arrondissement: Arras
- Canton: Avesnes-le-Comte
- Intercommunality: CC Campagnes de l'Artois

Government
  - Mayor (2020–2026): Freddy Balavoine
- Area^{1}: 5.08 km^{2} (1.96 sq mi)
- Elevation: 83 m (272 ft)
- Highest elevation: 127 m (417 ft)
- Lowest elevation: 76 m (249 ft)
- Population (2023): 443
  - Density: 87.2/km^{2} (226/sq mi)
- Time zone: UTC+01:00 (CET)
  - Summer (DST): UTC+02:00 (CEST)
- INSEE/Postal code: 62586 /62123
- ^{1} French Land Register data, which excludes lakes, ponds, glaciers > 1 km^{2} (0.386 sq mi or 247 acres) and river estuaries.

Montenescourt is a commune in the Pas-de-Calais department in the Hauts-de-France region of France.

== Geography ==
Montenescourt is situated 7 miles (11 km) west of Arras, at the junction of the D61 and the D56 roads.

== Population ==
Historical population
Year	Pop.	±% p.a.
1968	153	—
1975	227	+5.80%
1982	362	+6.89%
1990	418	+1.81%
1999	408	−0.27%
2007	411	+0.09%
2012	432	+1.00%
2017	460	+1.26%
2023	443	−0.63%
Source: INSEE

== Places of interest ==
- The church of St.Leger, dating from the seventeenth century.

== See also ==
- Communes of the Pas-de-Calais department
