= Lattre-Saint-Quentin =

- Commune
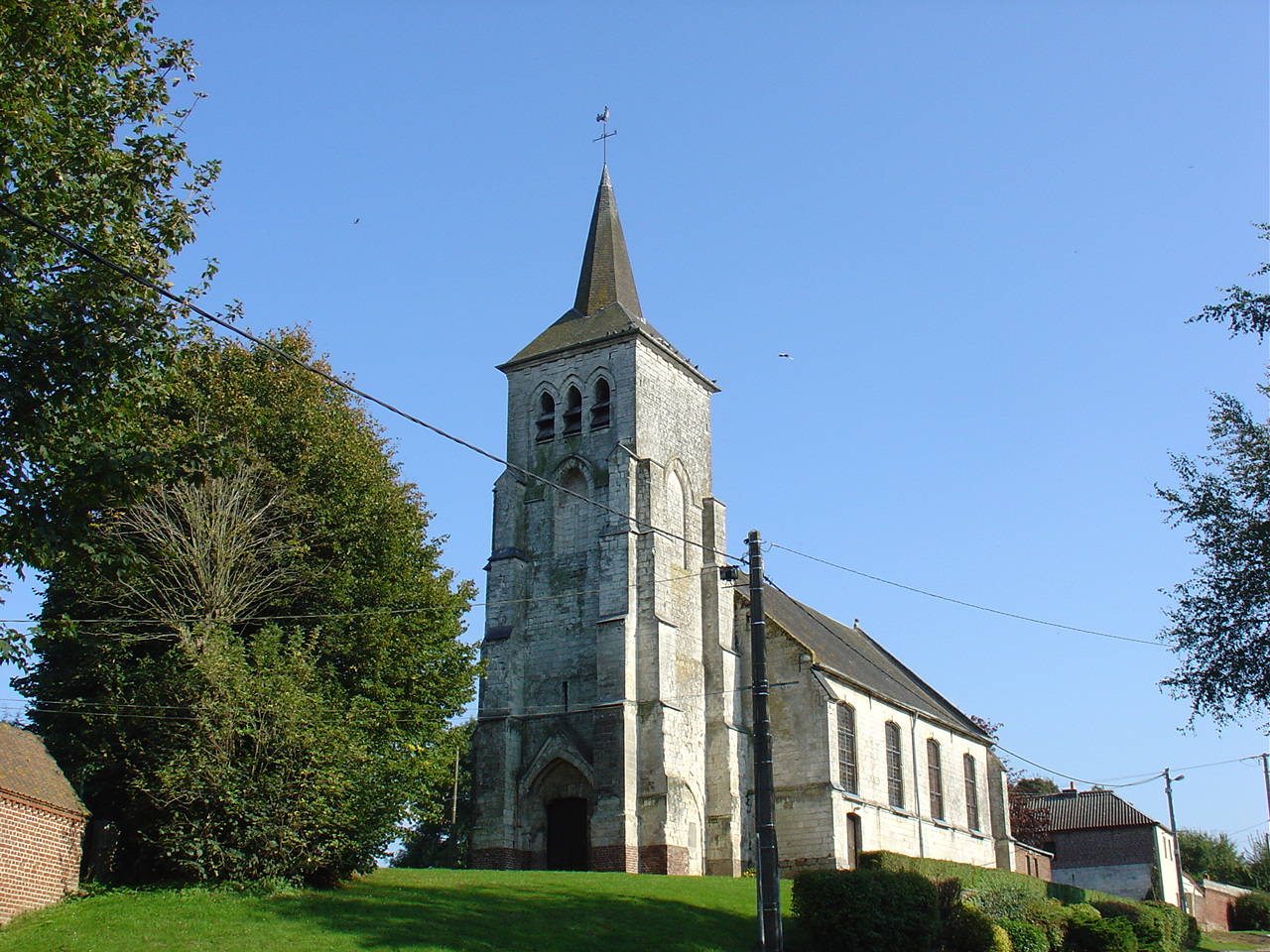
- The church of Lattre-Saint-Quentin

- Coat of arms
- Location of Lattre-Saint-Quentin
- Location within France Location within Hauts-de-France
- Coordinates: 50°17′21″N 2°34′53″E
- Country: France
- Region: Hauts-de-France
- Department: Pas-de-Calais
- Arrondissement: Arras
- Canton: Avesnes-le-Comte
- Intercommunality: CC Campagnes de l'Artois

Government
  - Mayor (2020–2026): Martine Gérard
- Area^{1}: 7.63 km^{2} (2.95 sq mi)
- Elevation: 125 m (410 ft)
- Highest elevation: 132 m (433 ft)
- Lowest elevation: 87 m (285 ft)
- Population (2023): 341
  - Density: 44.7/km^{2} (116/sq mi)
- Time zone: UTC+01:00 (CET)
  - Summer (DST): UTC+02:00 (CEST)
- INSEE/Postal code: 62490 /62810
- ^{1} French Land Register data, which excludes lakes, ponds, glaciers > 1 km^{2} (0.386 sq mi or 247 acres) and river estuaries.

Lattre-Saint-Quentin (French pronunciation: [latʁ sɛ̃ kɑ̃tɛ̃]) is a commune in the Pas-de-Calais department in the Hauts-de-France region of France 10 miles (16 km) west of Arras.

== Population ==
Historical population
Year	Pop.	±% p.a.
1968	202	—
1975	157	−3.54%
1982	180	+1.97%
1990	191	+0.74%
1999	193	+0.12%
2007	221	+1.71%
2012	245	+2.08%
2017	267	+1.73%
2023	341	+4.16%
Source: INSEE

== See also ==
- Communes of the Pas-de-Calais department
