= Denier, Pas-de-Calais =

Denier
- Commune
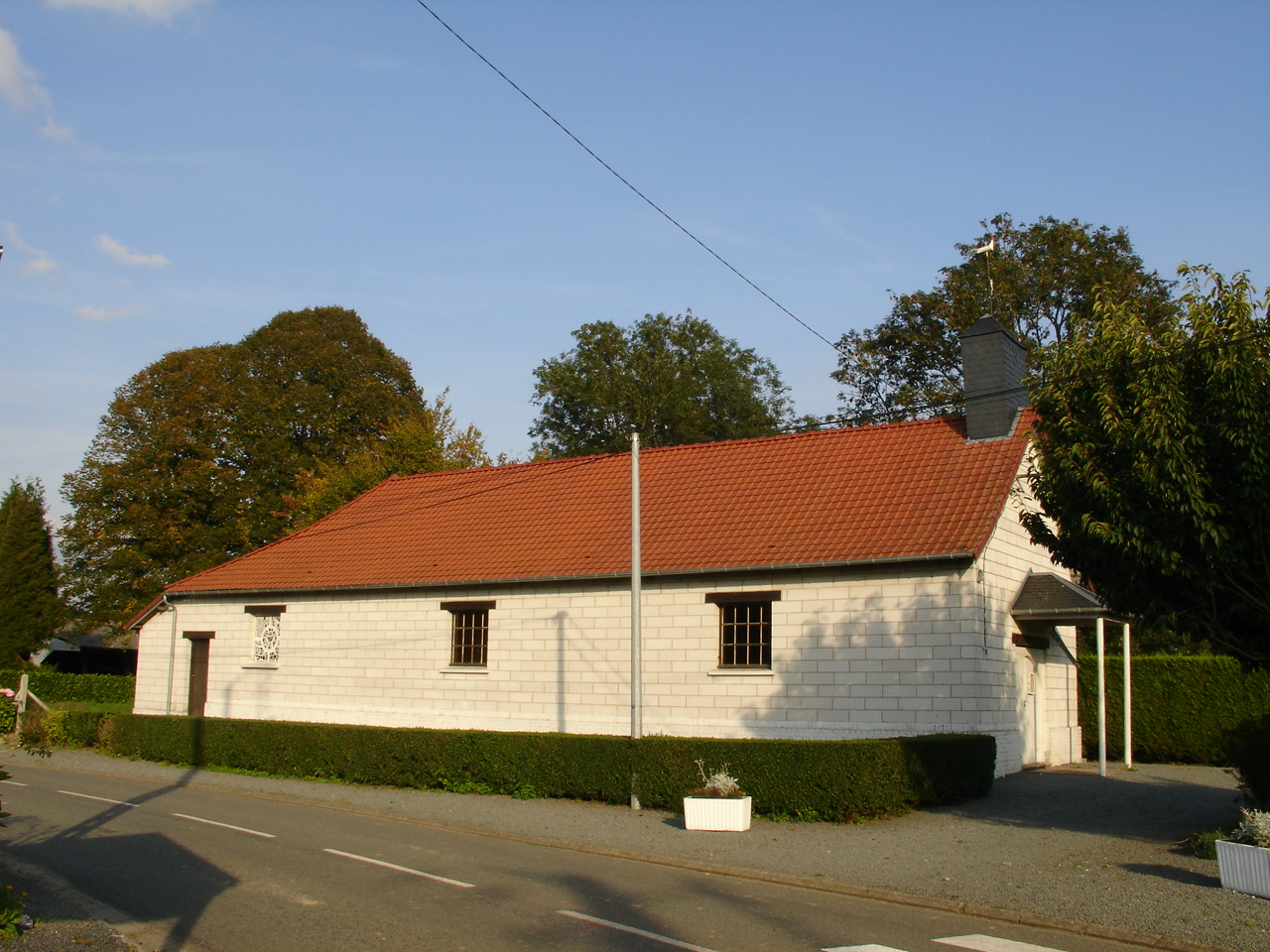
- The church of Denier

- Coat of arms
- Location of Denier
- Location within France Location within Hauts-de-France
- Coordinates: 50°17′19″N 2°26′41″E
- Country: France
- Region: Hauts-de-France
- Department: Pas-de-Calais
- Arrondissement: Arras
- Canton: Avesnes-le-Comte
- Intercommunality: CC Campagnes de l'Artois

Government
  - Mayor (2020–2026): Jean Bridel
- Area^{1}: 3.1 km^{2} (1.2 sq mi)
- Elevation: 126 m (413 ft)
- Highest elevation: 146 m (479 ft)
- Lowest elevation: 98 m (322 ft)
- Population (2023): 94
  - Density: 30/km^{2} (79/sq mi)
- Time zone: UTC+01:00 (CET)
  - Summer (DST): UTC+02:00 (CEST)
- INSEE/Postal code: 62266 /62810
- ^{1} French Land Register data, which excludes lakes, ponds, glaciers > 1 km^{2} (0.386 sq mi or 247 acres) and river estuaries.

Denier (French pronunciation: [dənje]) is a commune in the Pas-de-Calais département in the Hauts-de-France region of France. It is a small farming village 16 miles (26 km) west of Arras.

== Population ==
Historical population
Year	Pop.	±% p.a.
1968	110	—
1975	88	−3.14%
1982	74	−2.44%
1990	61	−2.39%
1999	58	−0.56%
2007	44	−3.39%
2012	72	+10.35%
2017	86	+3.62%
2023	94	+1.49%
Source: INSEE

== See also ==
- Communes of the Pas-de-Calais department
