= Grand-Rullecourt =

- Commune
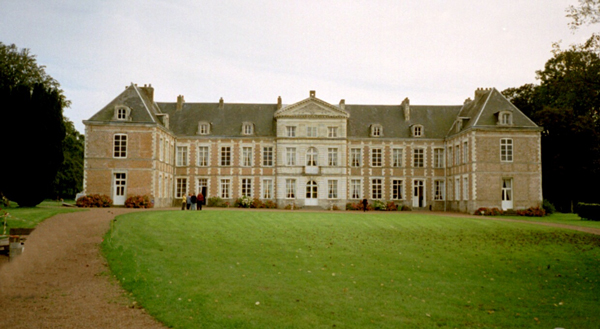
- Chateau of Grand-Rullecourt

- Coat of arms
- Location of Grand-Rullecourt
- Location within France Location within Hauts-de-France
- Coordinates: 50°15′19″N 2°28′30″E
- Country: France
- Region: Hauts-de-France
- Department: Pas-de-Calais
- Arrondissement: Arras
- Canton: Avesnes-le-Comte
- Intercommunality: CC Campagnes de l'Artois

Government
  - Mayor (2020–2026): Stéphane Locquet
- Area^{1}: 10.71 km^{2} (4.14 sq mi)
- Elevation: 140 m (460 ft)
- Highest elevation: 172 m (564 ft)
- Lowest elevation: 129 m (423 ft)
- Population (2023): 383
  - Density: 35.8/km^{2} (92.6/sq mi)
- Time zone: UTC+01:00 (CET)
  - Summer (DST): UTC+02:00 (CEST)
- INSEE/Postal code: 62385 /62810
- ^{1} French Land Register data, which excludes lakes, ponds, glaciers > 1 km^{2} (0.386 sq mi or 247 acres) and river estuaries.

Grand-Rullecourt (French pronunciation: [ɡʁɑ̃ ʁylkuʁ]; Picard: Grand-Roucourt) is a commune in the Pas-de-Calais department in the Hauts-de-France region of France.

== Geography ==
Grand-Rullecourt is a farming village situated 15 miles (24 km) southwest of Arras, at the junction of the D74 and D79 roads.

== Population ==
Historical population
Year	Pop.	±% p.a.
1968	350	—
1975	376	+1.03%
1982	354	−0.86%
1990	351	−0.11%
1999	334	−0.55%
2007	374	+1.42%
2012	402	+1.45%
2017	410	+0.39%
2023	383	−1.13%
Source: INSEE

== Places of interest ==
- The chateau, built in 1746 by Antoine-Constant de Hamel, next to the previous castle, to plans by Jean-Joseph de Watelet, mayor of the city of Arras. After the French Revolution, the chateau was sold as a national asset, (Antoine's son having died on the scaffold). His grandson bought it back but couldn't afford to keep it. It later belonged to Captain Wallerand de Hauteclocque, who was killed during World War I. After the war, the property was sold in parts. The present owners, Vicomte Patrice de Saulieu O'Toole and his wife Chantal, are currently restoring the main building.
- The church of St.Leger, dating from the seventeenth century.
- A network of tunnels, particularly under the church.
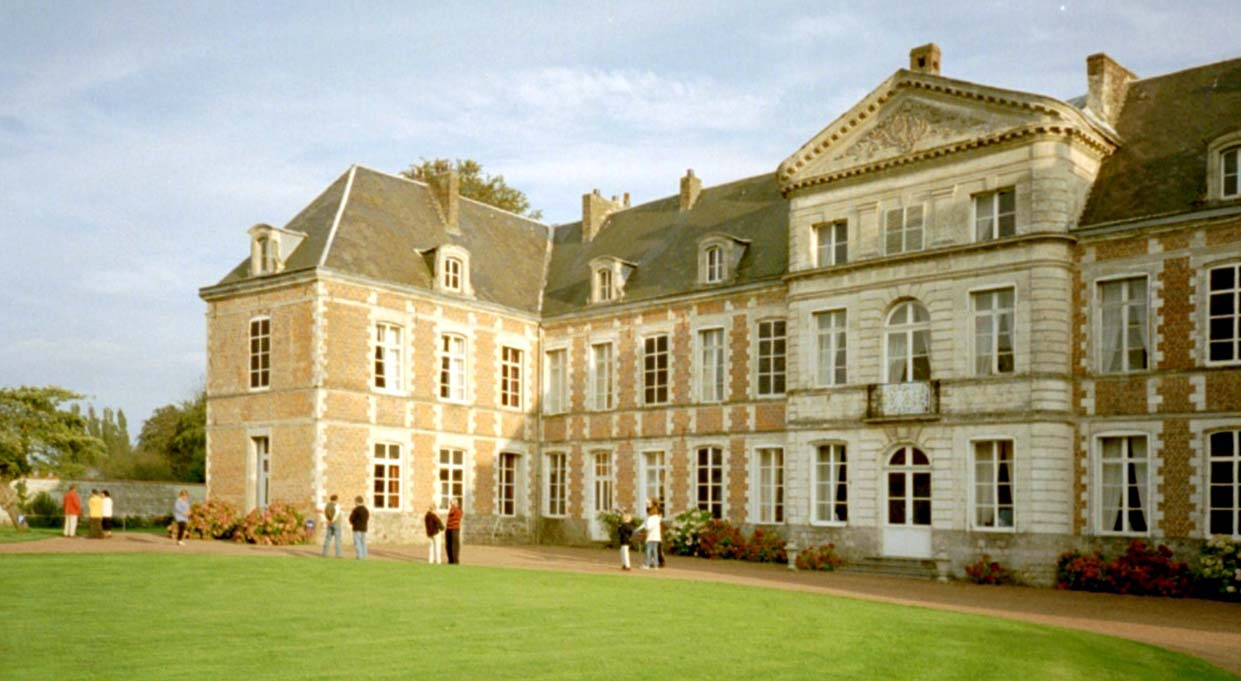
The front of the chateau

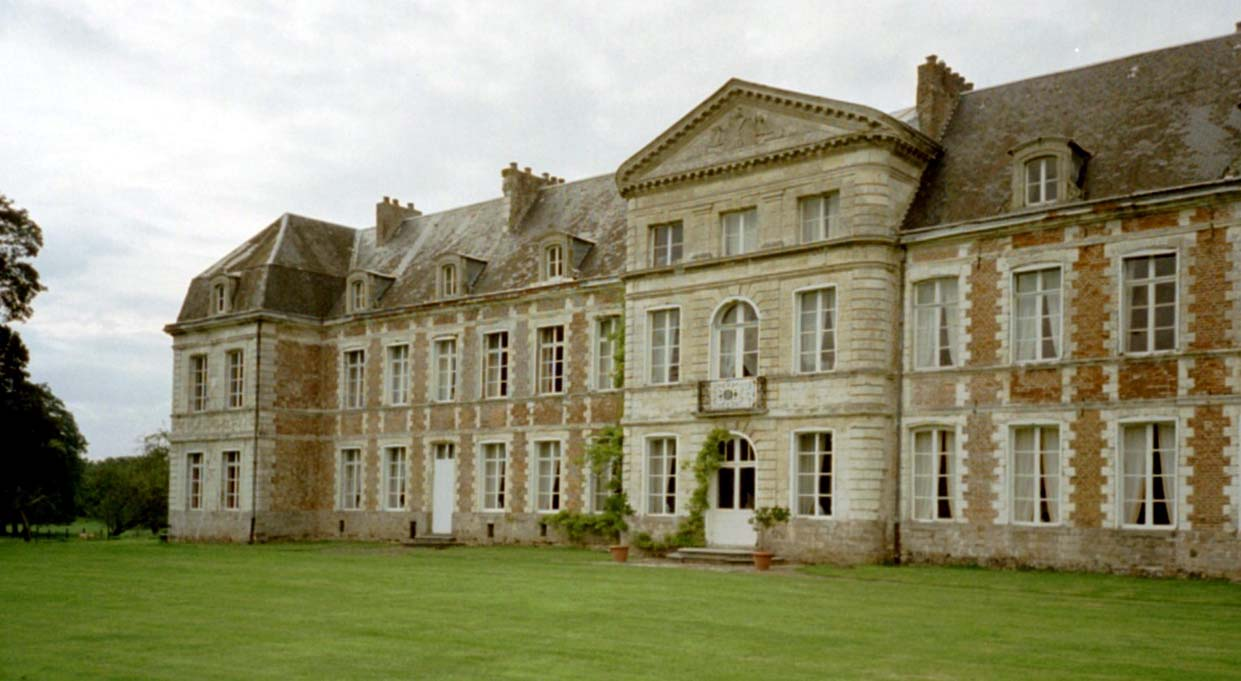
The rear facade

== See also ==
- Communes of the Pas-de-Calais department
