= Noyelle-Vion =

- Commune
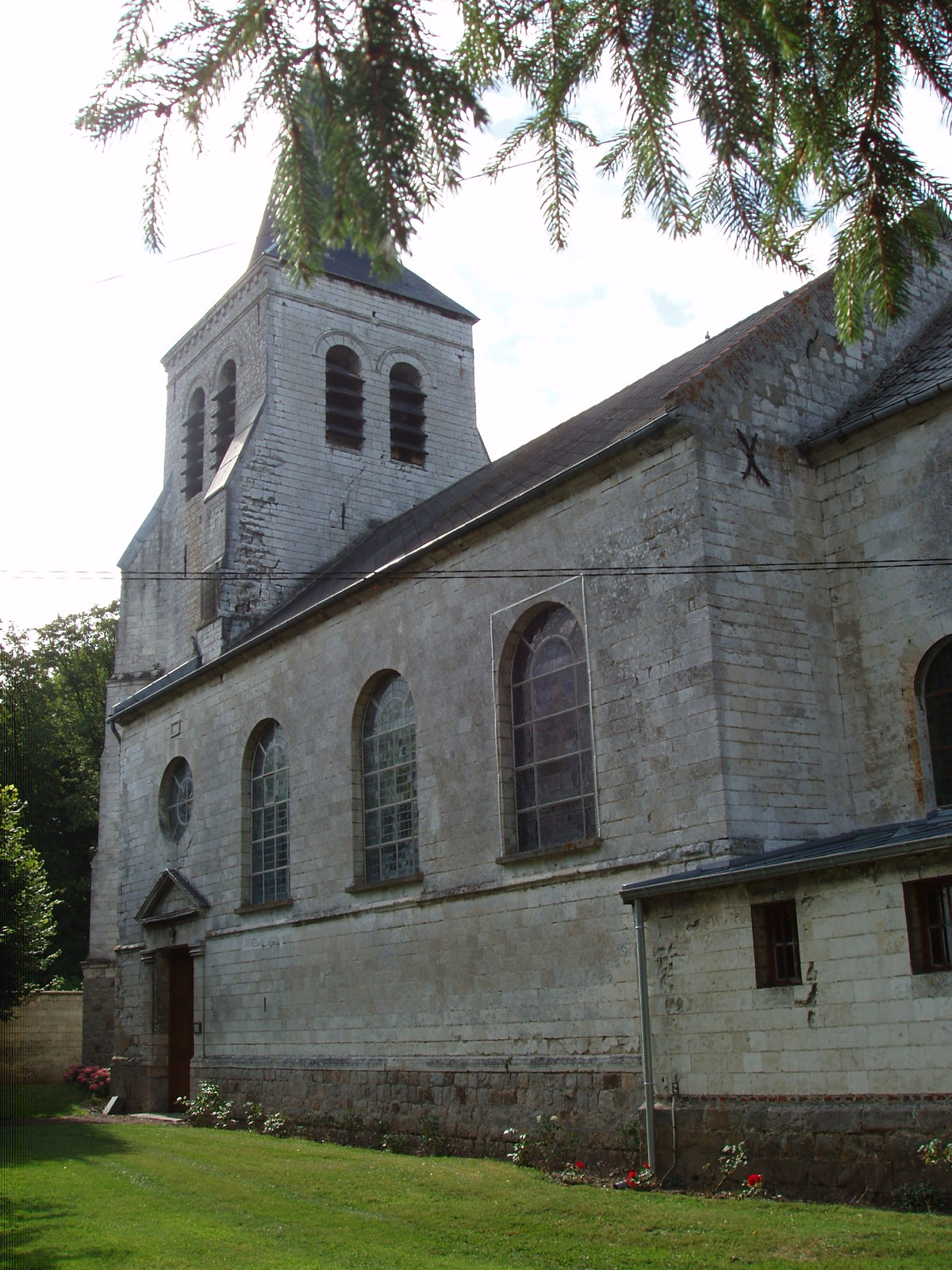
- The church of Noyelle-Vion

- Coat of arms
- Location of Noyelle-Vion
- Location within France Location within Hauts-de-France
- Coordinates: 50°17′31″N 2°33′02″E
- Country: France
- Region: Hauts-de-France
- Department: Pas-de-Calais
- Arrondissement: Arras
- Canton: Avesnes-le-Comte
- Intercommunality: CC Campagnes de l'Artois

Government
  - Mayor (2020–2026): Gérard Nicolle
- Area^{1}: 5.36 km^{2} (2.07 sq mi)
- Elevation: 110 m (360 ft)
- Highest elevation: 148 m (486 ft)
- Lowest elevation: 91 m (299 ft)
- Population (2023): 256
  - Density: 47.8/km^{2} (124/sq mi)
- Time zone: UTC+01:00 (CET)
  - Summer (DST): UTC+02:00 (CEST)
- INSEE/Postal code: 62630 /62810
- ^{1} French Land Register data, which excludes lakes, ponds, glaciers > 1 km^{2} (0.386 sq mi or 247 acres) and river estuaries.

Noyelle-Vion (French pronunciation: [nwajɛl vjɔ̃]; Picard: Nöyot-Wion) is a commune in the Pas-de-Calais department in the Hauts-de-France region of France 10 miles (16 km) west of Arras.

== Population ==
Historical population
Year	Pop.	±% p.a.
1968	263	—
1975	252	−0.61%
1982	265	+0.72%
1990	261	−0.19%
1999	260	−0.04%
2007	248	−0.59%
2012	270	+1.71%
2017	294	+1.72%
2023	256	−2.28%
Source: INSEE

== See also ==
- Communes of the Pas-de-Calais department
