= Communauté de communes de l'Atrébatie =

Coordinates: 50.3226°N 2.5858°E

l'Atrébatie
- Former communauté de communes
- Interactive map of l'Atrébatie
- Country: France
- Region: Hauts-de-France
- Department: Pas-de-Calais
- No. of communes: {{{nbcomm}}}
- Established: 1999
- Disbanded: 2017
- Population (1999): 11,755

The Communauté de communes de l'Atrébatie was located in the Pas-de-Calais département, in northern France. It was created in January 1999. It was merged into the new Communauté de communes des Campagnes de l'Artois in January 2017.

== Composition ==
It comprised the following 27 communes:

1. Agnières
2. Ambrines
3. Aubigny-en-Artois
4. Avesnes-le-Comte
5. Bailleul-aux-Cornailles
6. Berles-Monchel
7. Béthonsart
8. Camblain-l'Abbé
9. Cambligneul
10. Capelle-Fermont
11. Chelers
12. Frévillers
13. Frévin-Capelle
14. Hermaville
15. Izel-lès-Hameau
16. Magnicourt-en-Comte
17. Maizières
18. Manin
19. Mingoval
20. Noyelle-Vion
21. Penin
22. Savy-Berlette
23. Tilloy-lès-Hermaville
24. Tincques
25. Villers-Brûlin
26. Villers-Châtel
27. Villers-Sir-Simon
