= Communauté de communes des Deux Sources =

Communauté de communes des Deux Sources (fr: the community of communes of the Two Sources) is a French former inter-commune structure, located in the department of the Pas-de-Calais and the Hauts-de-France region. It was established in 2008 from the merger of 2 Communauté de communes: the communauté de communes du Canton de Pas-en-Artois (the community of communes in Pas-en-Artois) and the communauté de communes des Villages solidaires (community of communes of independent villages). It was dissolved in January 2017, when most of its communes joined the Communauté de communes des Campagnes de l'Artois.

== Composition ==
The Communauté de communes comprised the following communes:

- Amplier
- Barly
- Bavincourt
- Beaudricourt
- Beaufort-Blavincourt
- Berlencourt-le-Cauroy
- Bienvillers-au-Bois
- Canettemont
- Couin
- Coullemont
- Couturelle
- Denier
- Estrée-Wamin
- Famechon
- Foncquevillers
- Gaudiempré
- Givenchy-le-Noble
- Gommecourt
- Grand-Rullecourt
- Grincourt-lès-Pas
- Halloy
- Hannescamps
- Hébuterne
- Hénu
- Houvin-Houvigneul
- Humbercamps
- Ivergny
- Le Souich
- Liencourt
- Lignereuil
- Magnicourt-sur-Canche
- Mondicourt
- Orville
- Pas-en-Artois
- Pommera
- Pommier
- Puisieux
- Rebreuve-sur-Canche
- Rebreuviette
- Sailly-au-Bois
- Saint-Amand
- Sars-le-Bois
- Sarton, Pas-de-Calais
- Saulty
- Sombrin
- Souastre
- Sus-Saint-Léger
- Thièvres
- Warlincourt-lès-Pas
- Warluzel
