= Barly =

Barly may refer to:

- Barly, Pas-de-Calais, a commune in France
- Barly, Somme, a commune in France
- A character in Brawl Stars
