= Famechon =

Famechon is the name of two communes in France:

- Famechon, Pas-de-Calais
- Famechon, Somme

Famechon is also the name of a former boxing champion, Johnny Famechon.
