= Monchiet =

- Commune
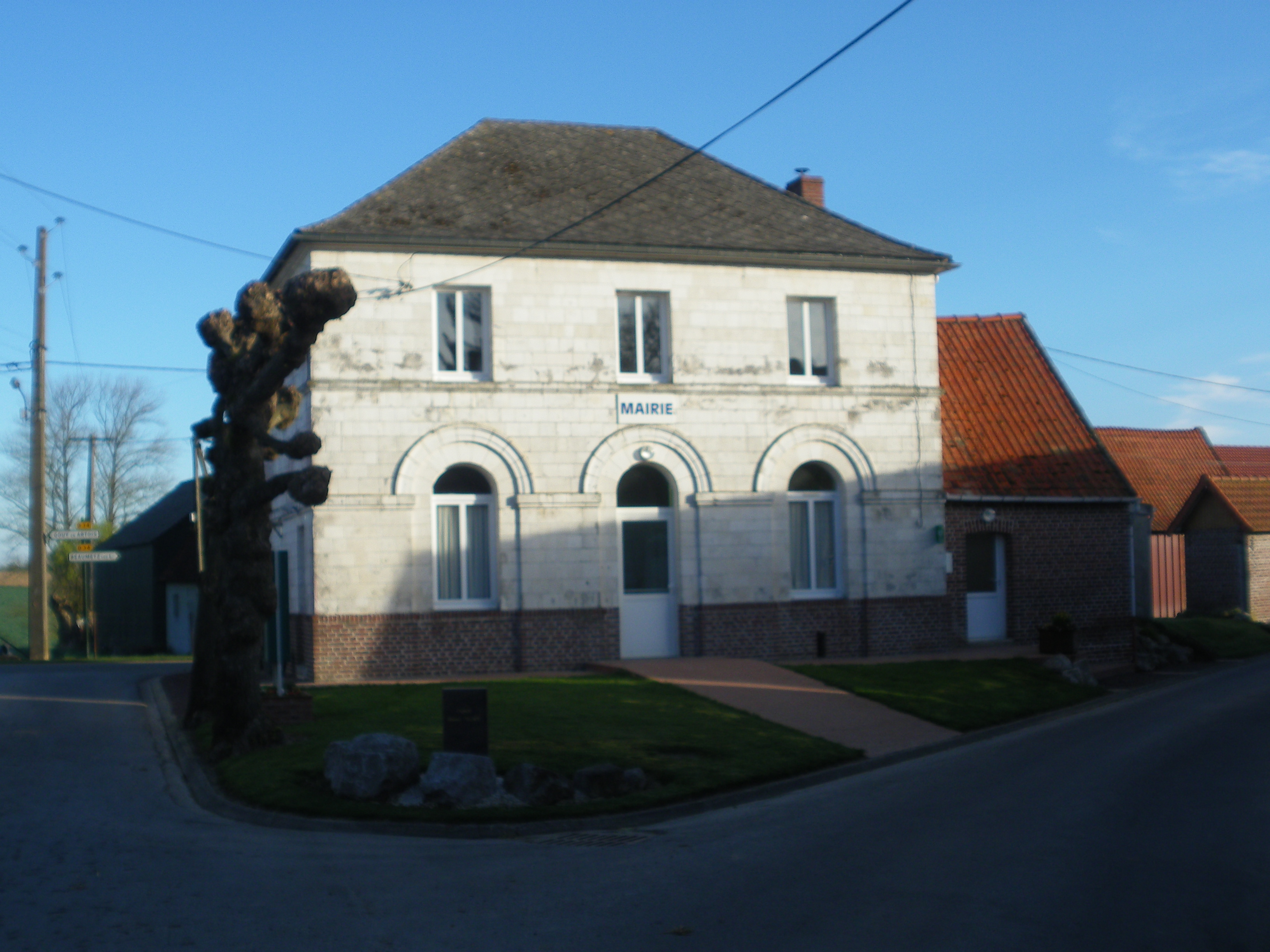
- The town hall of Monchiet

- Coat of arms
- Location of Monchiet
- Location within France Location within Hauts-de-France
- Coordinates: 50°14′26″N 2°37′46″E
- Country: France
- Region: Hauts-de-France
- Department: Pas-de-Calais
- Arrondissement: Arras
- Canton: Avesnes-le-Comte
- Intercommunality: CC Campagnes de l'Artois

Government
  - Mayor (2020–2026): Denis Caillerez
- Area^{1}: 2.74 km^{2} (1.06 sq mi)
- Elevation: 140 m (460 ft)
- Highest elevation: 145 m (476 ft)
- Lowest elevation: 107 m (351 ft)
- Population (2023): 104
  - Density: 38.0/km^{2} (98.3/sq mi)
- Time zone: UTC+01:00 (CET)
  - Summer (DST): UTC+02:00 (CEST)
- INSEE/Postal code: 62578 /62123
- ^{1} French Land Register data, which excludes lakes, ponds, glaciers > 1 km^{2} (0.386 sq mi or 247 acres) and river estuaries.

Monchiet (French pronunciation: [mɔ̃ʃjɛ]) is a commune in the Pas-de-Calais department in the Hauts-de-France region of France 8 miles (13 km) southwest of Arras.

== Population ==
Historical population
Year	Pop.	±% p.a.
1968	100	—
1975	101	+0.14%
1982	90	−1.63%
1990	83	−1.01%
1999	84	+0.13%
2007	97	+1.81%
2012	96	−0.21%
2017	96	+0.00%
2023	104	+1.34%
Source: INSEE

== See also ==
- Communes of the Pas-de-Calais department
