= Rivière, Pas-de-Calais =

Rivière
- Commune
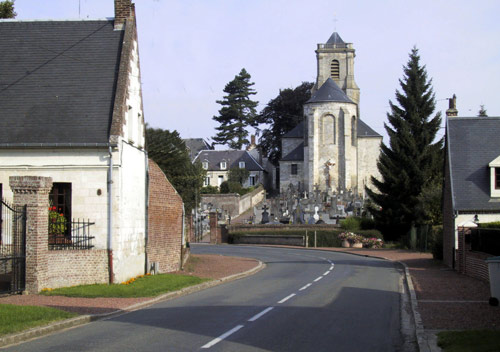
- The church of Rivière

- Coat of arms
- Location of Rivière
- Location within France Location within Hauts-de-France
- Coordinates: 50°14′00″N 2°41′25″E
- Country: France
- Region: Hauts-de-France
- Department: Pas-de-Calais
- Arrondissement: Arras
- Canton: Avesnes-le-Comte
- Intercommunality: CU Arras

Government
  - Mayor (2020–2026): Gabriel Bertein
- Area^{1}: 11.9 km^{2} (4.6 sq mi)
- Elevation: 107 m (351 ft)
- Highest elevation: 131 m (430 ft)
- Lowest elevation: 75 m (246 ft)
- Population (2023): 1,123
  - Density: 94.4/km^{2} (244/sq mi)
- Time zone: UTC+01:00 (CET)
  - Summer (DST): UTC+02:00 (CEST)
- INSEE/Postal code: 62712 /62173
- ^{1} French Land Register data, which excludes lakes, ponds, glaciers > 1 km^{2} (0.386 sq mi or 247 acres) and river estuaries.

Rivière (French pronunciation: [ʁivjɛʁ]) is a commune in the Pas-de-Calais department in the Hauts-de-France region of France 6 miles (10 km) southwest of Arras.

== History ==
The five hamlets of Bellacourt, Bellacordelle, Brétencourt, Grosville and Le Fermont became the commune of Rivière in 1789.

== Population ==
The inhabitants are called Riviérois in French.

Historical population
| Year | Pop. | ±% p.a. |
|---|---|---|
| 1968 | 963 | — |
| 1975 | 963 | +0.00% |
| 1982 | 1,102 | +1.94% |
| 1990 | 1,142 | +0.45% |
| 1999 | 1,122 | −0.20% |
| 2007 | 1,124 | +0.02% |
| 2012 | 1,129 | +0.09% |
| 2017 | 1,123 | −0.11% |
| 2023 | 1,123 | +0.00% |
Source: INSEE

== See also ==
- Communes of the Pas-de-Calais department
