= Gouy-en-Artois =

Gouy-en-Artois Gouy-in-Artoé (Picard)
- Commune
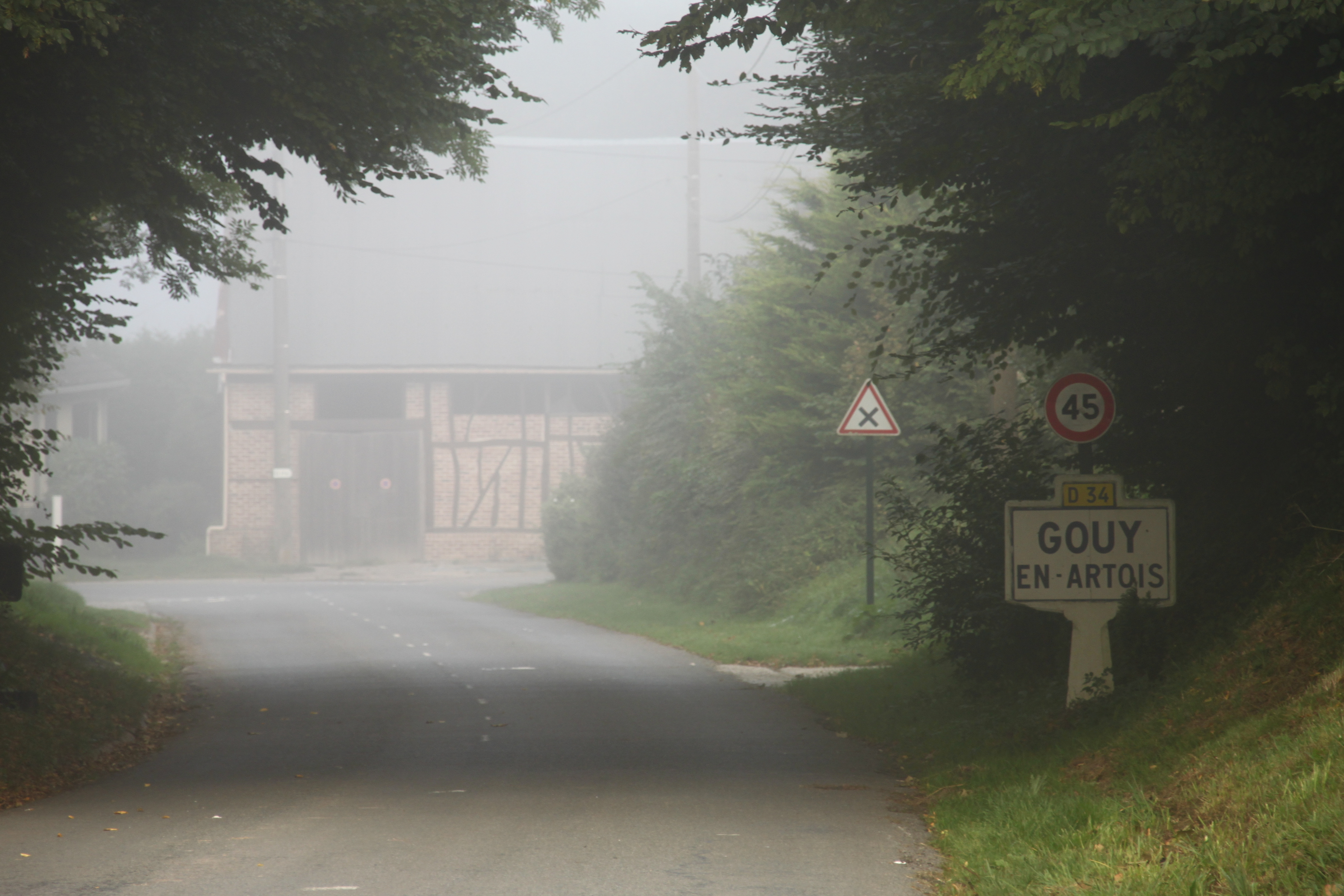
- The road into Gouy-en-Artois

- Coat of arms
- Location of Gouy-en-Artois
- Location within France Location within Hauts-de-France
- Coordinates: 50°14′52″N 2°35′46″E
- Country: France
- Region: Hauts-de-France
- Department: Pas-de-Calais
- Arrondissement: Arras
- Canton: Avesnes-le-Comte
- Intercommunality: CC Campagnes de l'Artois

Government
  - Mayor (2020–2026): Hubert Dingreville
- Area^{1}: 10.11 km^{2} (3.90 sq mi)
- Elevation: 113 m (371 ft)
- Highest elevation: 153 m (502 ft)
- Lowest elevation: 97 m (318 ft)
- Population (2023): 327
  - Density: 32.3/km^{2} (83.8/sq mi)
- Time zone: UTC+01:00 (CET)
  - Summer (DST): UTC+02:00 (CEST)
- INSEE/Postal code: 62379 /62123
- ^{1} French Land Register data, which excludes lakes, ponds, glaciers > 1 km^{2} (0.386 sq mi or 247 acres) and river estuaries.

Gouy-en-Artois (French: [ɡwi ɑ̃n‿aʁtwɑ]; Picard: Gouy-in-Artoé; literally "Gouy in Artois") is a commune in the Pas-de-Calais department in the Hauts-de-France region of France 9 miles (14 km) southwest of Arras.

== Population ==
Historical population
Year	Pop.	±% p.a.
1968	437	—
1975	407	−1.01%
1982	386	−0.75%
1990	383	−0.10%
1999	375	−0.23%
2007	353	−0.75%
2012	332	−1.22%
2017	330	−0.12%
2023	327	−0.15%
Source: INSEE

== See also ==
- Communes of the Pas-de-Calais department
