= Habarcq =

- Commune
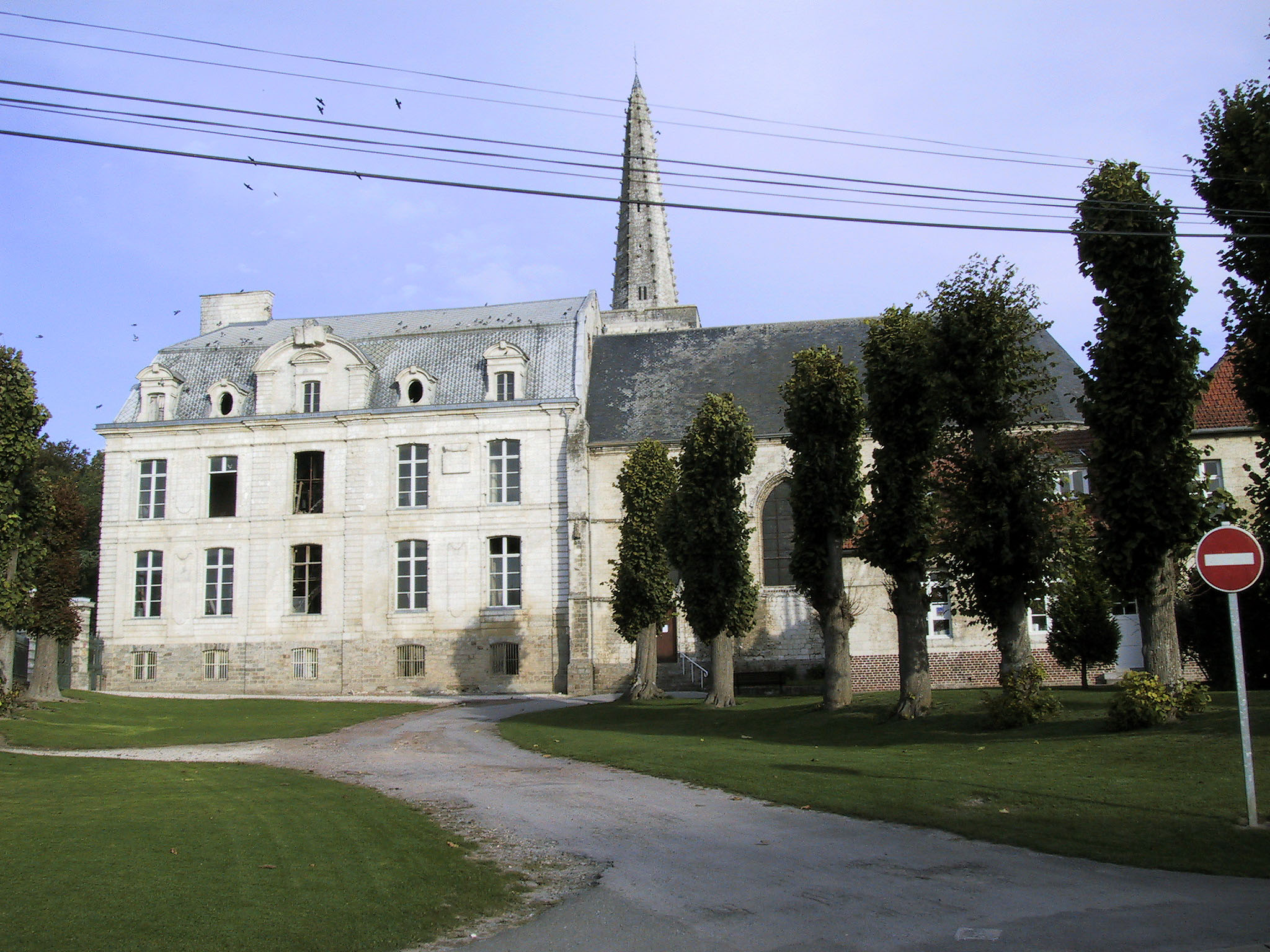
- Church and chateau

- Coat of arms
- Location of Habarcq
- Location within France Location within Hauts-de-France
- Coordinates: 50°18′24″N 2°36′41″E
- Country: France
- Region: Hauts-de-France
- Department: Pas-de-Calais
- Arrondissement: Arras
- Canton: Avesnes-le-Comte
- Intercommunality: Campagnes de l'Artois

Government
  - Mayor (2020–2026): Nicolas Capron
- Area^{1}: 7.03 km^{2} (2.71 sq mi)
- Elevation: 94 m (308 ft)
- Highest elevation: 136 m (446 ft)
- Lowest elevation: 77 m (253 ft)
- Population (2023): 676
  - Density: 96.2/km^{2} (249/sq mi)
- Time zone: UTC+01:00 (CET)
  - Summer (DST): UTC+02:00 (CEST)
- INSEE/Postal code: 62399 /62123
- ^{1} French Land Register data, which excludes lakes, ponds, glaciers > 1 km^{2} (0.386 sq mi or 247 acres) and river estuaries.

Habarcq (French pronunciation: [abaʁ]) is a commune in the Pas-de-Calais department in the Hauts-de-France region of France.

== Geography ==
A small farming village situated 8 miles (13 km) west of Arras, at the junction of the D339 and the D7 roads.

== Population ==
Historical population
| Year | Pop. | ±% p.a. |
|---|---|---|
| 1968 | 376 | — |
| 1975 | 374 | −0.08% |
| 1982 | 391 | +0.64% |
| 1990 | 581 | +5.08% |
| 1999 | 609 | +0.52% |
| 2007 | 668 | +1.16% |
| 2012 | 675 | +0.21% |
| 2017 | 676 | +0.03% |
| 2023 | 676 | +0.00% |
Source: INSEE

== Places of interest ==
- The church of St.Martin, dating from the sixteenth century.
- The ruins of an old castle.
- The chateau, dating from the eighteenth century.
- The Commonwealth War Graves Commission cemetery.

== See also ==
- Communes of the Pas-de-Calais department
