= Canton of Avesnes-le-Comte =

Coordinates: 50°15′54″N 2°28′03″E

Avesnes-le-Comte
- Canton
- Location of Avesnes-le-Comte within the department
- Country: France
- Region: Hauts-de-France
- Department: Pas-de-Calais
- No. of communes: {{{nbcomm}}}
- Area: 643.53 km^{2} (248.47 sq mi)
- Population (2023): 38,589
  - Density: 59.965/km^{2} (155.31/sq mi)
- INSEE code: 62 07

The Canton of Avesnes-le-Comte is a canton situated in the department of the Pas-de-Calais and in the northern Hauts-de-France region of France.

== Geography ==
The canton is organized around Avesnes-le-Comte in the arrondissement of Arras.

== Composition ==
At the French canton reorganisation which came into effect in March 2015, the canton was expanded from 31 to 108 communes:

- Adinfer
- Agnez-lès-Duisans
- Agnières
- Ambrines
- Amplier
- Aubigny-en-Artois
- Avesnes-le-Comte
- Bailleul-aux-Cornailles
- Bailleulmont
- Bailleulval
- Barly
- Basseux
- Bavincourt
- Beaudricourt
- Beaufort-Blavincourt
- Berlencourt-le-Cauroy
- Berles-au-Bois
- Berles-Monchel
- Berneville
- Béthonsart
- Bienvillers-au-Bois
- Blairville
- Boiry-Sainte-Rictrude
- Boiry-Saint-Martin
- Cambligneul
- Camblain-l'Abbé
- Canettemont
- Capelle-Fermont
- La Cauchie
- Chelers
- Couin
- Coullemont
- Couturelle
- Denier
- Duisans
- Estrée-Wamin
- Famechon
- Ficheux
- Foncquevillers
- Fosseux
- Frévillers
- Frévin-Capelle
- Gaudiempré
- Givenchy-le-Noble
- Gommecourt
- Gouves
- Gouy-en-Artois
- Grand-Rullecourt
- Grincourt-lès-Pas
- Habarcq
- Halloy
- Hannescamps
- Haute-Avesnes
- Hauteville
- Hébuterne
- Hendecourt-lès-Ransart
- Hénu
- La Herlière
- Hermaville
- Houvin-Houvigneul
- Humbercamps
- Ivergny
- Izel-lès-Hameau
- Lattre-Saint-Quentin
- Liencourt
- Lignereuil
- Magnicourt-en-Comte
- Magnicourt-sur-Canche
- Maizières
- Manin
- Mingoval
- Monchiet
- Monchy-au-Bois
- Mondicourt
- Montenescourt
- Noyellette
- Noyelle-Vion
- Orville
- Pas-en-Artois
- Penin
- Pommera
- Pommier
- Puisieux
- Ransart
- Rebreuve-sur-Canche
- Rebreuviette
- Rivière
- Sailly-au-Bois
- Saint-Amand
- Sars-le-Bois
- Sarton
- Saulty
- Savy-Berlette
- Simencourt
- Sombrin
- Souastre
- Le Souich
- Sus-Saint-Léger
- Thièvres
- Tilloy-lès-Hermaville
- Tincques
- Villers-Brûlin
- Villers-Châtel
- Villers-Sir-Simon
- Wanquetin
- Warlincourt-lès-Pas
- Warlus
- Warluzel

== Population ==
Historical population
Year	Pop.	±% p.a.
2013	38,650	—
2018	38,426	−0.12%
Source: INSEE

== See also ==
- Cantons of Pas-de-Calais
- Communes of Pas-de-Calais
- Arrondissements of the Pas-de-Calais department
