= Agnières =

- Commune
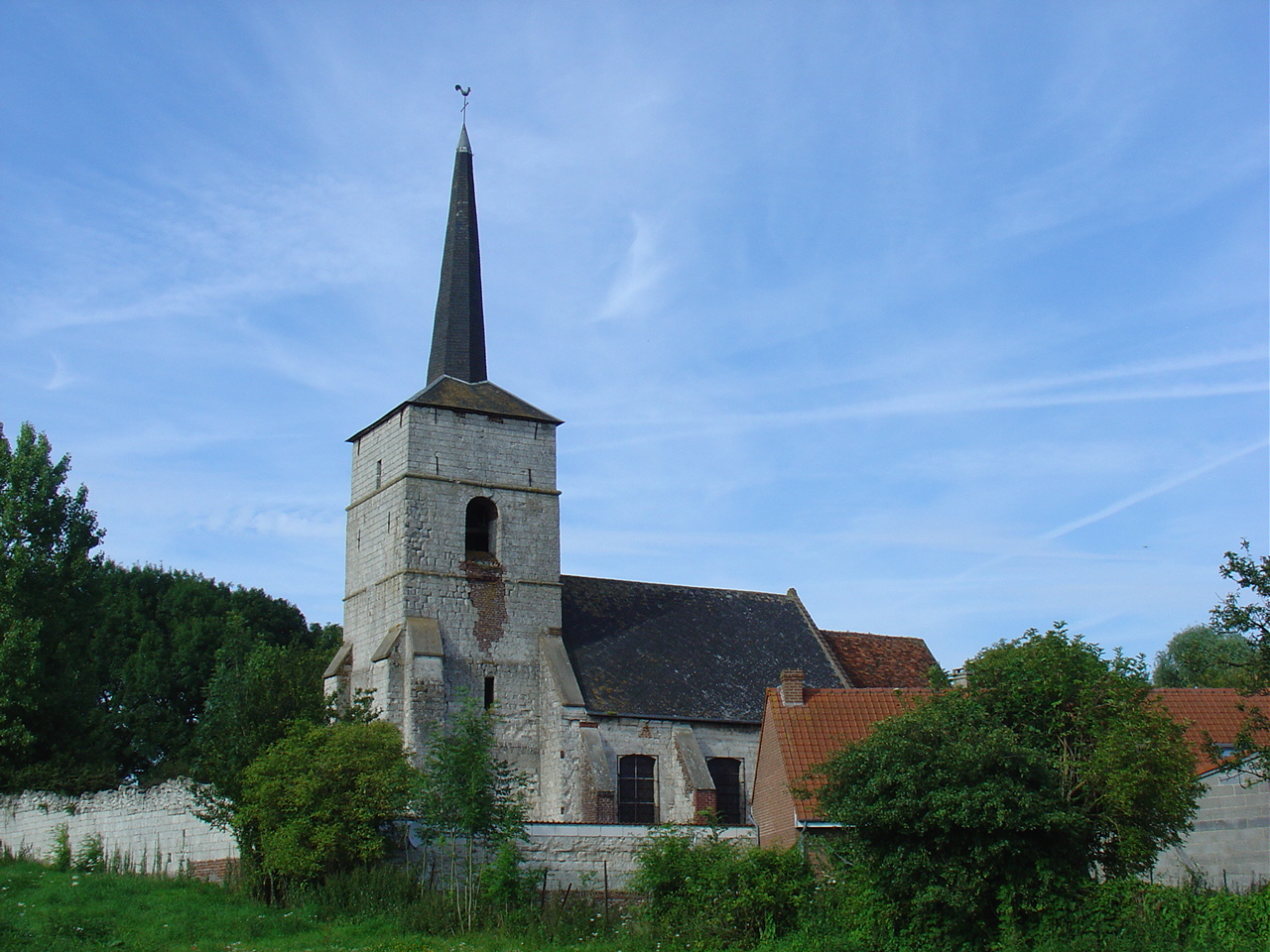
- The church of Agnières

- Coat of arms
- Location of Agnières
- Location within France Location within Hauts-de-France
- Coordinates: 50°21′14″N 2°36′17″E
- Country: France
- Region: Hauts-de-France
- Department: Pas-de-Calais
- Arrondissement: Arras
- Canton: Avesnes-le-Comte
- Intercommunality: Campagnes de l'Artois

Government
  - Mayor (2020–2026): Pascal Mestan
- Area^{1}: 3.25 km^{2} (1.25 sq mi)
- Elevation: 90 m (300 ft)
- Highest elevation: 131 m (430 ft)
- Lowest elevation: 87 m (285 ft)
- Population (2023): 255
  - Density: 78.5/km^{2} (203/sq mi)
- Time zone: UTC+01:00 (CET)
  - Summer (DST): UTC+02:00 (CEST)
- INSEE/Postal code: 62012 /62690
- ^{1} French Land Register data, which excludes lakes, ponds, glaciers > 1 km^{2} (0.386 sq mi or 247 acres) and river estuaries.

Agnières (French pronunciation: [aɲɛʁ]) is a commune in the Pas-de-Calais department in northern France.

== Geography ==
A small farming village located 10 miles (16 km) northwest of Arras, by the banks of the river Scarpe, at the D49 and D75E road junction.

== Population ==
Historical population
Year	Pop.	±% p.a.
1968	153	—
1975	170	+1.52%
1982	174	+0.33%
1990	185	+0.77%
1999	150	−2.30%
2007	216	+4.66%
2012	248	+2.80%
2017	249	+0.08%
2023	255	+0.40%
Source: INSEE

== Sights ==
- The church of St.Leger, dating from the twelfth century.

== See also ==
- Communes of the Pas-de-Calais department
