= Manin, Pas-de-Calais =

Manin Manning
- Commune
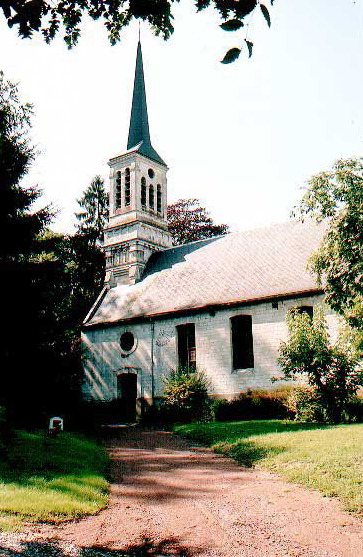
- The church of Manin

- Coat of arms
- Location of Manin
- Location within France Location within Hauts-de-France
- Coordinates: 50°17′54″N 2°30′43″E
- Country: France
- Region: Hauts-de-France
- Department: Pas-de-Calais
- Arrondissement: Arras
- Canton: Avesnes-le-Comte
- Intercommunality: CC Campagnes de l'Artois

Government
  - Mayor (2020–2026): Philippe Duez
- Area^{1}: 4.07 km^{2} (1.57 sq mi)
- Elevation: 125 m (410 ft)
- Highest elevation: 152 m (499 ft)
- Lowest elevation: 113 m (371 ft)
- Population (2023): 182
  - Density: 44.7/km^{2} (116/sq mi)
- Time zone: UTC+01:00 (CET)
  - Summer (DST): UTC+02:00 (CEST)
- INSEE/Postal code: 62544 /62810
- ^{1} French Land Register data, which excludes lakes, ponds, glaciers > 1 km^{2} (0.386 sq mi or 247 acres) and river estuaries.

Manin (French pronunciation: [manɛ̃]; West Flemish: Manning) is a commune in the Pas-de-Calais department in the Hauts-de-France region of France 15 miles (24 km) west of Arras.

== Population ==
Historical population
Year	Pop.	±% p.a.
1968	149	—
1975	146	−0.29%
1982	151	+0.48%
1990	158	+0.57%
1999	178	+1.33%
2007	189	+0.75%
2012	197	+0.83%
2017	185	−1.25%
2023	182	−0.27%
Source: INSEE

== See also ==
- Communes of the Pas-de-Calais department
