= Villers-Châtel =

- Commune
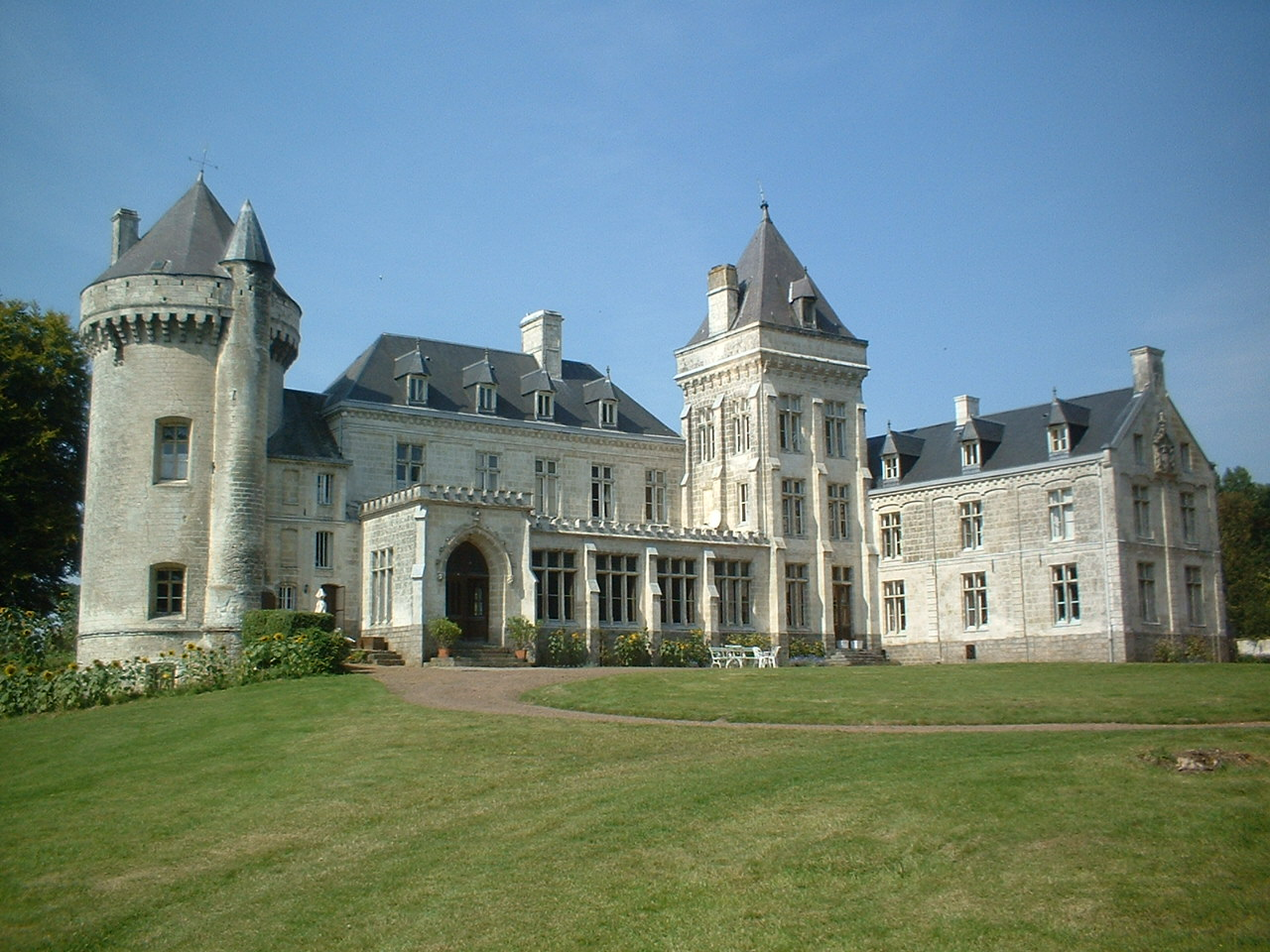
- The chateau of Villers-Châtel

- Coat of arms
- Location of Villers-Châtel
- Location within France Location within Hauts-de-France
- Coordinates: 50°22′38″N 2°35′17″E
- Country: France
- Region: Hauts-de-France
- Department: Pas-de-Calais
- Arrondissement: Arras
- Canton: Avesnes-le-Comte
- Intercommunality: CC Campagnes de l'Artois

Government
  - Mayor (2023–2026): Muriel Sergier
- Area^{1}: 3.17 km^{2} (1.22 sq mi)
- Elevation: 147 m (482 ft)
- Highest elevation: 159 m (522 ft)
- Lowest elevation: 111 m (364 ft)
- Population (2023): 127
  - Density: 40.1/km^{2} (104/sq mi)
- Time zone: UTC+01:00 (CET)
  - Summer (DST): UTC+02:00 (CEST)
- INSEE/Postal code: 62857 /62690
- ^{1} French Land Register data, which excludes lakes, ponds, glaciers > 1 km^{2} (0.386 sq mi or 247 acres) and river estuaries.

Villers-Châtel (French pronunciation: [vilɛʁ ʃatɛl]) is a commune in the Pas-de-Calais department in the Hauts-de-France region of France.

== Geography ==
Villers-Châtel is situated some 13 miles (21 km) northwest of Arras, on the D73E2 road.

== Population ==
Historical population
Year	Pop.	±% p.a.
1968	106	—
1975	76	−4.64%
1982	92	+2.77%
1990	115	+2.83%
1999	123	+0.75%
2007	118	−0.52%
2012	133	+2.42%
2017	135	+0.30%
2023	127	−1.01%
Source: INSEE

== Places of interest ==
- The chateau, dating from the fourteenth century.

== See also ==
- Communes of the Pas-de-Calais department
