= Chelers =

- Commune
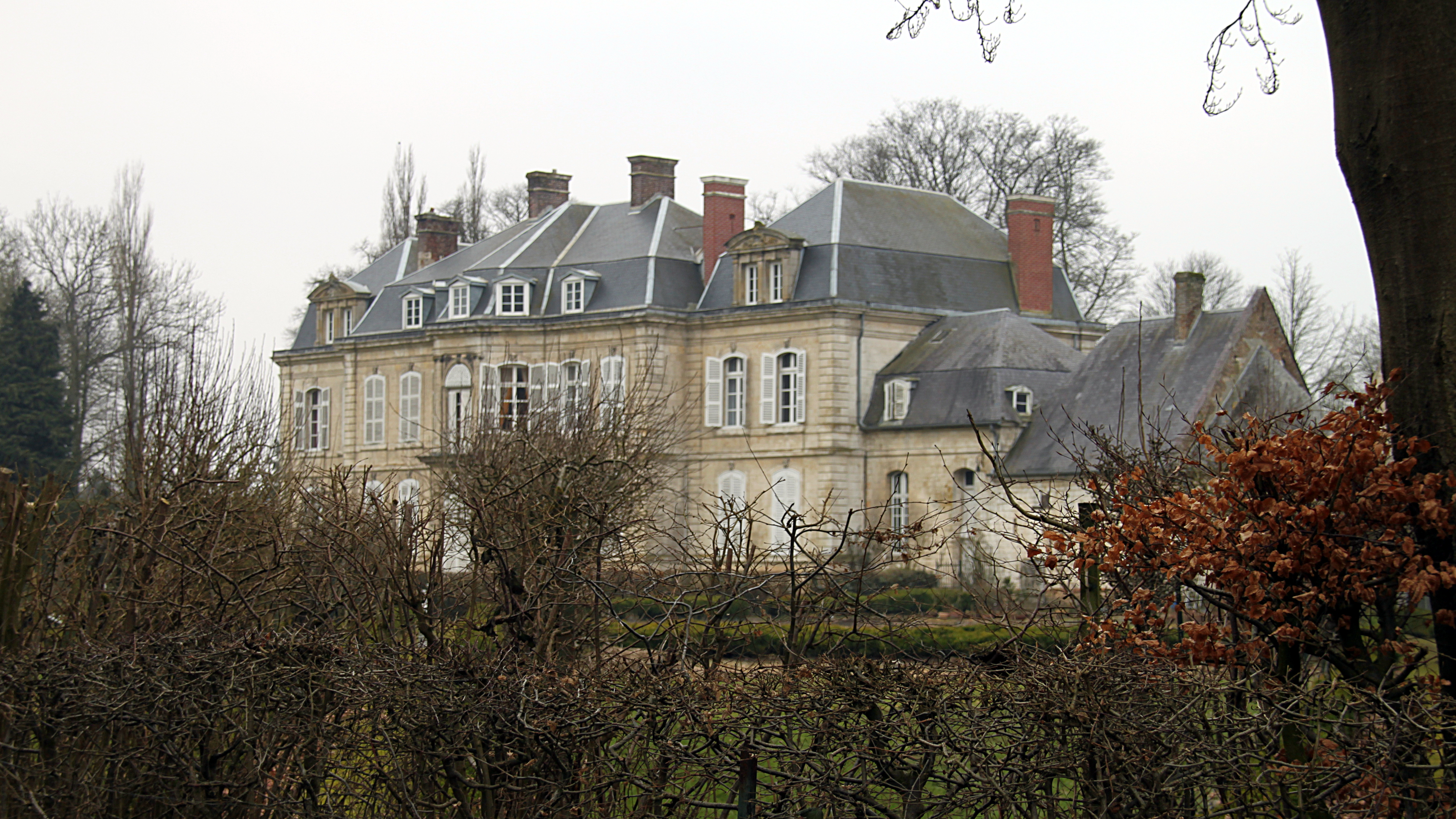
- The chateau of Chelers

- Coat of arms
- Location of Chelers
- Location within France Location within Hauts-de-France
- Coordinates: 50°22′35″N 2°29′10″E
- Country: France
- Region: Hauts-de-France
- Department: Pas-de-Calais
- Arrondissement: Arras
- Canton: Avesnes-le-Comte
- Intercommunality: CC Campagnes de l'Artois

Government
  - Mayor (2020–2026): Raymond Wacheux
- Area^{1}: 8.04 km^{2} (3.10 sq mi)
- Elevation: 148 m (486 ft)
- Highest elevation: 158 m (518 ft)
- Lowest elevation: 126 m (413 ft)
- Population (2023): 247
  - Density: 30.7/km^{2} (79.6/sq mi)
- Time zone: UTC+01:00 (CET)
  - Summer (DST): UTC+02:00 (CEST)
- INSEE/Postal code: 62221 /62127
- ^{1} French Land Register data, which excludes lakes, ponds, glaciers > 1 km^{2} (0.386 sq mi or 247 acres) and river estuaries.

Chelers is a commune in the Pas-de-Calais department in the Hauts-de-France region of France.

== Geography ==
A farming village located 13 miles (22 km) west-northwest of Arras at the junction of the D77 with the D72 road.

== Population ==
Historical population
Year	Pop.	±% p.a.
1968	301	—
1975	284	−0.83%
1982	286	+0.10%
1990	260	−1.18%
1999	258	−0.09%
2007	282	+1.12%
2012	279	−0.21%
2017	259	−1.48%
2023	247	−0.79%
Source: INSEE

== Places of interest ==
- The church of St.Martin, dating from the eighteenth century.
- The Commonwealth War Graves Commission cemetery.
- An eighteenth-century chateau.

== See also ==
- Communes of the Pas-de-Calais department
