= Hénu =

- Commune
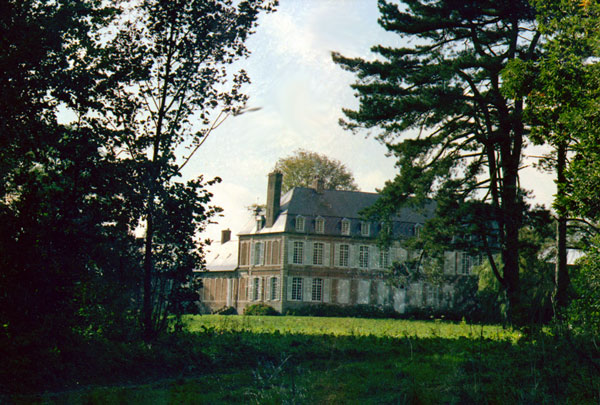
- The chateau

- Coat of arms
- Location of Hénu
- Location within France Location within Hauts-de-France
- Coordinates: 50°09′18″N 2°31′32″E
- Country: France
- Region: Hauts-de-France
- Department: Pas-de-Calais
- Arrondissement: Arras
- Canton: Avesnes-le-Comte
- Intercommunality: CC Campagnes de l'Artois

Government
  - Mayor (2020–2026): Jean-Paul Hemery
- Area^{1}: 4.38 km^{2} (1.69 sq mi)
- Elevation: 152 m (499 ft)
- Highest elevation: 162 m (531 ft)
- Lowest elevation: 104 m (341 ft)
- Population (2023): 147
  - Density: 33.6/km^{2} (86.9/sq mi)
- Time zone: UTC+01:00 (CET)
  - Summer (DST): UTC+02:00 (CEST)
- INSEE/Postal code: 62430 /62760
- ^{1} French Land Register data, which excludes lakes, ponds, glaciers > 1 km^{2} (0.386 sq mi or 247 acres) and river estuaries.

Hénu (French pronunciation: [eny]) is a commune in the Pas-de-Calais department in the Hauts-de-France region of France.

== Geography ==
A small farming village situated 18 miles (29 km) southwest of Arras, on the D6 road.

== Population ==
Historical population
Year	Pop.	±% p.a.
1968	178	—
1975	147	−2.70%
1982	127	−2.07%
1990	143	+1.49%
1999	152	+0.68%
2007	162	+0.80%
2012	162	+0.00%
2017	164	+0.25%
2023	147	−1.81%
Source: INSEE

== Places of interest ==
- The eighteenth-century chateau built by the de Coupigny family in 1745. It was seized during the French Revolution and used as a chicory factory.
- The church of St. Nicholas, dating from the eighteenth century.
- The Commonwealth War Graves Commission cemetery.

== See also ==
- Communes of the Pas-de-Calais department
