= Maizières, Pas-de-Calais =

Maizières
- Commune
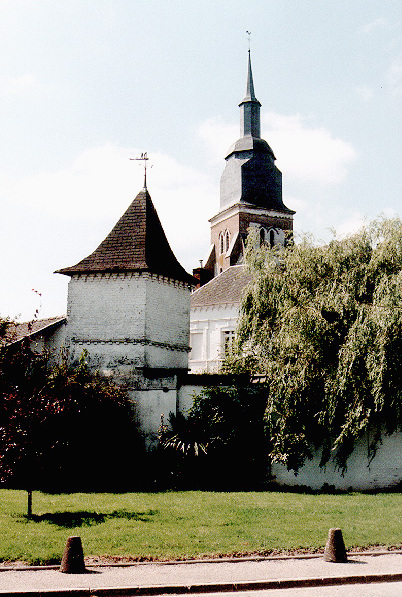
- Dovecote and the church

- Coat of arms
- Location of Maizières
- Location within France Location within Hauts-de-France
- Coordinates: 50°19′28″N 2°26′55″E
- Country: France
- Region: Hauts-de-France
- Department: Pas-de-Calais
- Arrondissement: Arras
- Canton: Avesnes-le-Comte
- Intercommunality: CC Campagnes de l'Artois

Government
  - Mayor (2020–2026): Raymond Lavigne
- Area^{1}: 6.86 km^{2} (2.65 sq mi)
- Elevation: 145 m (476 ft)
- Highest elevation: 153 m (502 ft)
- Lowest elevation: 123 m (404 ft)
- Population (2023): 205
  - Density: 29.9/km^{2} (77.4/sq mi)
- Time zone: UTC+01:00 (CET)
  - Summer (DST): UTC+02:00 (CEST)
- INSEE/Postal code: 62542 /62127
- ^{1} French Land Register data, which excludes lakes, ponds, glaciers > 1 km^{2} (0.386 sq mi or 247 acres) and river estuaries.

Maizières (French pronunciation: [mɛzjɛʁ]) is a commune in the Pas-de-Calais department in the Hauts-de-France region of France.

== Geography ==
Maizières is situated 16 miles (26 km) west of Arras, at the junction of the D8, D81 and the D82 roads.

== Population ==
Historical population
Year	Pop.	±% p.a.
1968	223	—
1975	175	−3.40%
1982	173	−0.16%
1990	177	+0.29%
1999	177	+0.00%
2007	162	−1.10%
2012	174	+1.44%
2017	193	+2.09%
2023	205	+1.01%
Source: INSEE

== Places of interest ==
- The church of St.Leger, dating from the seventeenth century.
- An old dovecote.

== See also ==
- Communes of the Pas-de-Calais department
