= Villers-Sir-Simon =

- Commune
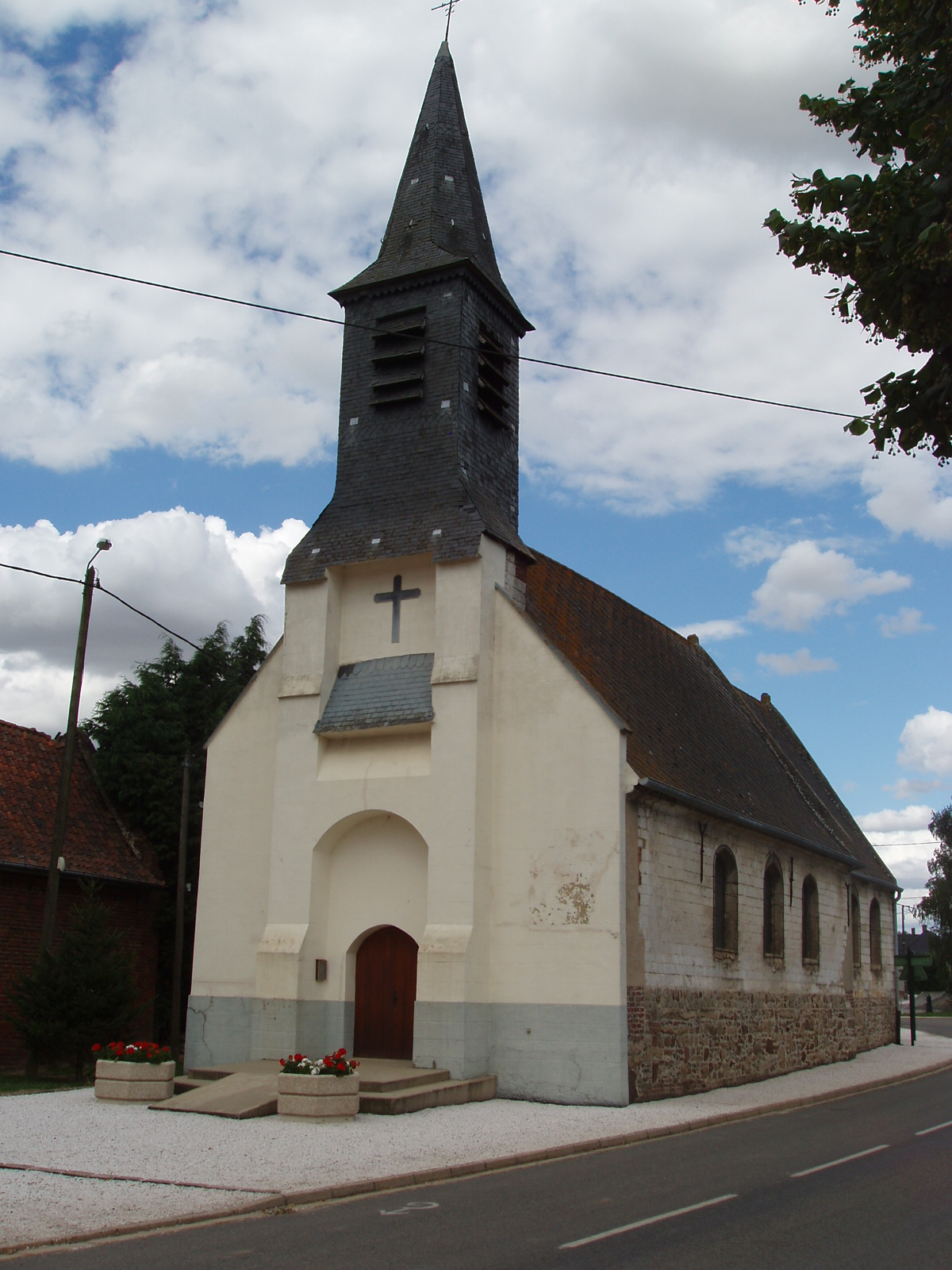
- The church of Villers-Sir-Simon

- Coat of arms
- Location of Villers-Sir-Simon
- Location within France Location within Hauts-de-France
- Coordinates: 50°19′06″N 2°29′34″E
- Country: France
- Region: Hauts-de-France
- Department: Pas-de-Calais
- Arrondissement: Arras
- Canton: Avesnes-le-Comte
- Intercommunality: CC Campagnes de l'Artois

Government
  - Mayor (2020–2026): Xavier Normand
- Area^{1}: 2.47 km^{2} (0.95 sq mi)
- Elevation: 128 m (420 ft)
- Highest elevation: 136 m (446 ft)
- Lowest elevation: 119 m (390 ft)
- Population (2023): 137
  - Density: 55.5/km^{2} (144/sq mi)
- Time zone: UTC+01:00 (CET)
  - Summer (DST): UTC+02:00 (CEST)
- INSEE/Postal code: 62860 /62127
- ^{1} French Land Register data, which excludes lakes, ponds, glaciers > 1 km^{2} (0.386 sq mi or 247 acres) and river estuaries.

Villers-Sir-Simon (French pronunciation: [vilɛʁ siʁ simɔ̃]) is a commune in the Pas-de-Calais department in the Hauts-de-France region of France.

== Geography ==
Villers-Sir-Simon is situated some 18 miles (29 km) west of Arras, at the junction of the D77 and D54 roads.

== Population ==
Historical population
Year	Pop.	±% p.a.
1968	125	—
1975	99	−3.28%
1982	114	+2.04%
1990	120	+0.64%
1999	121	+0.09%
2007	135	+1.38%
2012	122	−2.00%
2017	118	−0.66%
2023	137	+2.52%
Source: INSEE

== Places of interest ==
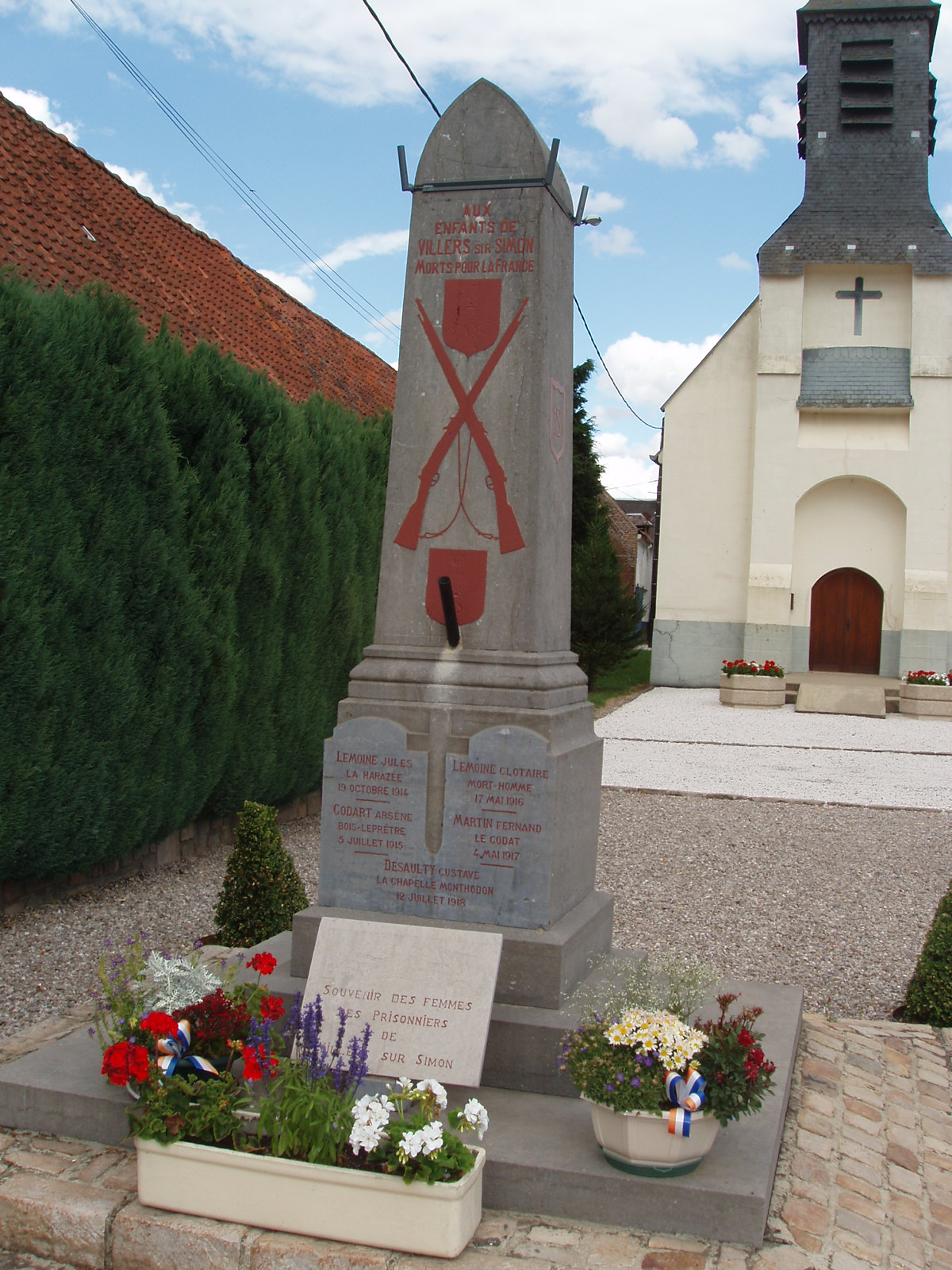
The war memorial

- Commemorative stone to the American aviators who died when their plane crashed nearby on 27 August 1943.
- The church of St. Eloi, dating from the nineteenth century.

== See also ==
- Communes of the Pas-de-Calais department
