= Bavincourt =

- Commune
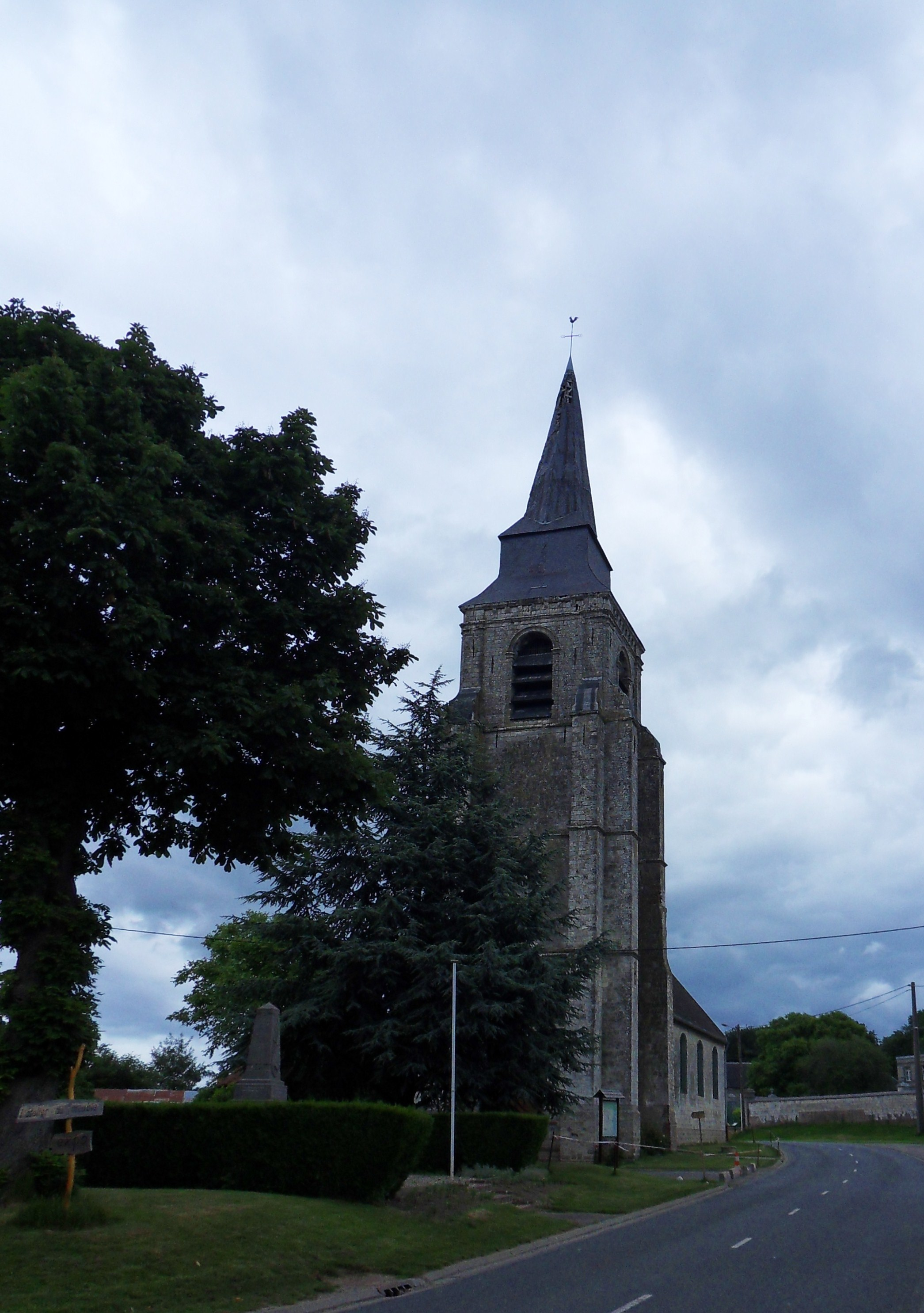
- The church of Bavincourt

- Coat of arms
- Location of Bavincourt
- Location within France Location within Hauts-de-France
- Coordinates: 50°13′33″N 2°34′07″E
- Country: France
- Region: Hauts-de-France
- Department: Pas-de-Calais
- Arrondissement: Arras
- Canton: Avesnes-le-Comte
- Intercommunality: CC Campagnes de l'Artois

Government
  - Mayor (2020–2026): Lionel Cayet
- Area^{1}: 7.54 km^{2} (2.91 sq mi)
- Elevation: 180 m (590 ft)
- Highest elevation: 177 m (581 ft)
- Lowest elevation: 125 m (410 ft)
- Population (2023): 417
  - Density: 55.3/km^{2} (143/sq mi)
- Time zone: UTC+01:00 (CET)
  - Summer (DST): UTC+02:00 (CEST)
- INSEE/Postal code: 62086 /62158
- ^{1} French Land Register data, which excludes lakes, ponds, glaciers > 1 km^{2} (0.386 sq mi or 247 acres) and river estuaries.

Bavincourt (French pronunciation: [bavɛ̃kuʁ]) is a commune in the Pas-de-Calais department in the Hauts-de-France region in northern France.

== Geography ==
A farming village located 14 miles (22 km) southwest of Arras on the D8 road.

== Population ==
Historical population
Year	Pop.	±% p.a.
1968	403	—
1975	373	−1.10%
1982	327	−1.86%
1990	353	+0.96%
1999	347	−0.19%
2007	351	+0.14%
2012	382	+1.71%
2017	378	−0.21%
2023	417	+1.65%
Source: INSEE

== Sights ==
- The church of St. Vaast, dating from the eighteenth century.
- A nineteenth-century chateau.
- A chapel.
- The war graves in the cemetery.

== See also ==
- Communes of the Pas-de-Calais department
