= Bailleul-aux-Cornailles =

- Commune
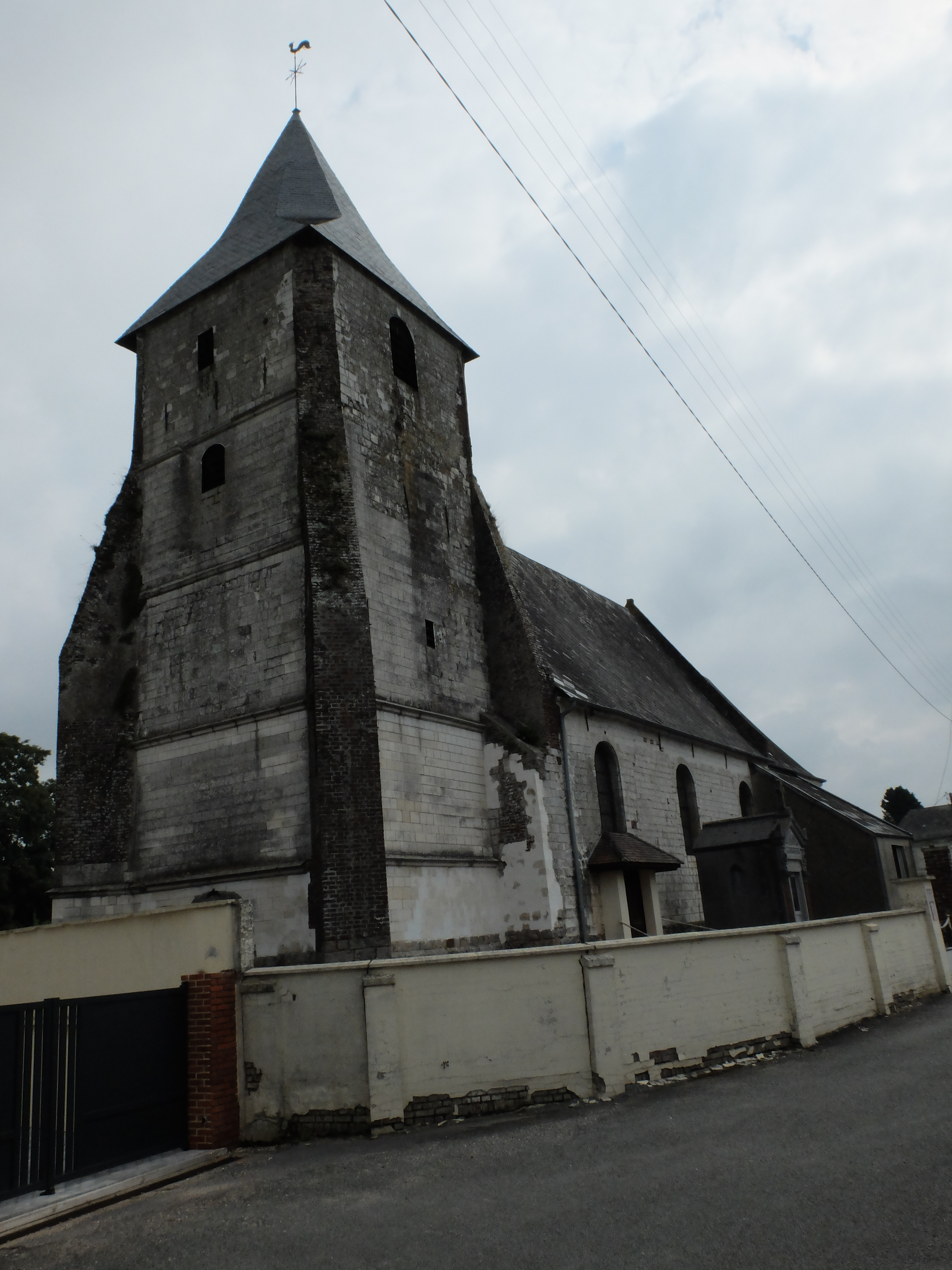
- The church of Bailleul-aux-Cornailles

- Coat of arms
- Location of Bailleul-aux-Cornailles
- Location within France Location within Hauts-de-France
- Coordinates: 50°22′19″N 2°26′45″E
- Country: France
- Region: Hauts-de-France
- Department: Pas-de-Calais
- Arrondissement: Arras
- Canton: Avesnes-le-Comte
- Intercommunality: CC Campagnes de l'Artois

Government
  - Mayor (2020–2026): Maurice Soyez
- Area^{1}: 6.82 km^{2} (2.63 sq mi)
- Elevation: 141 m (463 ft)
- Highest elevation: 158 m (518 ft)
- Lowest elevation: 116 m (381 ft)
- Population (2023): 264
  - Density: 38.7/km^{2} (100/sq mi)
- Time zone: UTC+01:00 (CET)
  - Summer (DST): UTC+02:00 (CEST)
- INSEE/Postal code: 62070 /62127
- ^{1} French Land Register data, which excludes lakes, ponds, glaciers > 1 km^{2} (0.386 sq mi or 247 acres) and river estuaries.

Bailleul-aux-Cornailles (French pronunciation: [bajœl o kɔʁnaj]) is a commune in the Pas-de-Calais department in the Hauts-de-France region of France.

== Geography ==
A farming village located 18 miles (28 km) northeast of Arras at the junction of the N39 and D83 roads.

== Population ==
Historical population
Year	Pop.	±% p.a.
1968	239	—
1975	230	−0.55%
1982	222	−0.50%
1990	247	+1.34%
1999	232	−0.69%
2007	252	+1.04%
2012	270	+1.39%
2017	263	−0.52%
2023	264	+0.06%
Source: INSEE

== Sights ==
- The church of St. Pierre, dating from the fifteenth century.
- The ancient priory of Bailleulet.

== See also ==
- Communes of the Pas-de-Calais department
