= Berles-Monchel =

- Commune
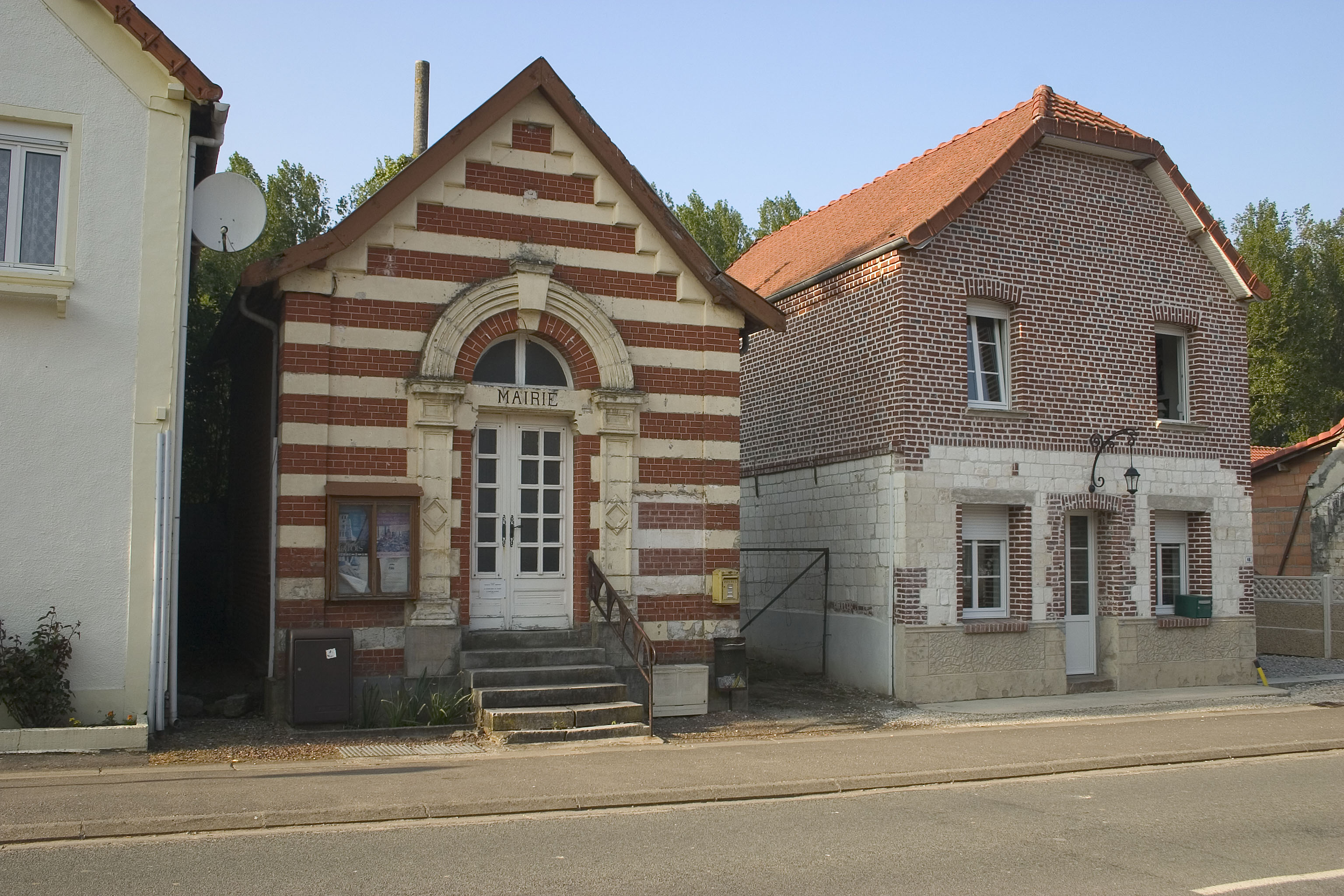
- The town hall of Berles

- Coat of arms
- Location of Berles-Monchel
- Location within France Location within Hauts-de-France
- Coordinates: 50°20′42″N 2°32′21″E
- Country: France
- Region: Hauts-de-France
- Department: Pas-de-Calais
- Arrondissement: Arras
- Canton: Avesnes-le-Comte
- Intercommunality: CC Campagnes de l'Artois

Government
  - Mayor (2022–2026): Hubert Morreel
- Area^{1}: 8.33 km^{2} (3.22 sq mi)
- Elevation: 210 m (690 ft)
- Highest elevation: 132 m (433 ft)
- Lowest elevation: 97 m (318 ft)
- Population (2023): 482
  - Density: 57.9/km^{2} (150/sq mi)
- Time zone: UTC+01:00 (CET)
  - Summer (DST): UTC+02:00 (CEST)
- INSEE/Postal code: 62113 /62690
- ^{1} French Land Register data, which excludes lakes, ponds, glaciers > 1 km^{2} (0.386 sq mi or 247 acres) and river estuaries.

Berles-Monchel (French pronunciation: [bɛʁl mɔ̃ʃɛl]) is a commune in the Pas-de-Calais department in the Hauts-de-France region in northern France.

== Geography ==
A village located 11 miles (17 km) northwest of Arras on the D82 junction with the N39 road, in the valley, and the source of the river Scarpe.

== Population ==
Historical population
| Year | Pop. | ±% p.a. |
|---|---|---|
| 1968 | 361 | — |
| 1975 | 347 | −0.56% |
| 1982 | 349 | +0.08% |
| 1990 | 434 | +2.76% |
| 1999 | 440 | +0.15% |
| 2007 | 457 | +0.47% |
| 2012 | 493 | +1.53% |
| 2017 | 488 | −0.20% |
| 2023 | 482 | −0.21% |
Source: INSEE

== Sights ==
- The eighteenth-century château.
- The Wandelicourt chapel, dating from the eighteenth century.
- The church of Saint-Pierre, dating from the sixteenth century.

== See also ==
- Communes of the Pas-de-Calais department
