= Ambrines =

- Commune
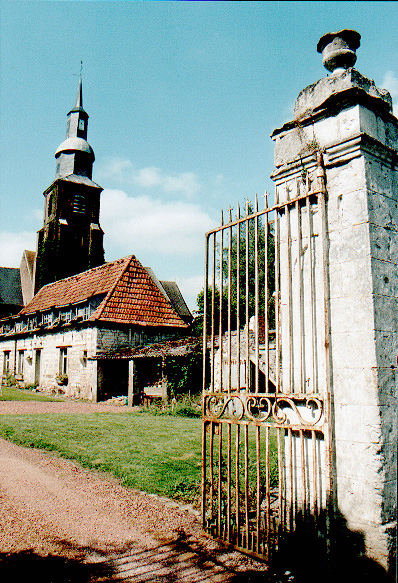
- The church of Ambrines

- Coat of arms
- Location of Ambrines
- Location within France Location within Hauts-de-France
- Coordinates: 50°18′41″N 2°28′10″E
- Country: France
- Region: Hauts-de-France
- Department: Pas-de-Calais
- Arrondissement: Arras
- Canton: Avesnes-le-Comte
- Intercommunality: Campagnes de l'Artois

Government
  - Mayor (2020–2026): Alain Rose
- Area^{1}: 4.68 km^{2} (1.81 sq mi)
- Elevation: 127 m (417 ft)
- Highest elevation: 139 m (456 ft)
- Lowest elevation: 107 m (351 ft)
- Population (2023): 211
  - Density: 45.1/km^{2} (117/sq mi)
- Time zone: UTC+01:00 (CET)
  - Summer (DST): UTC+02:00 (CEST)
- INSEE/Postal code: 62027 /62127
- ^{1} French Land Register data, which excludes lakes, ponds, glaciers > 1 km^{2} (0.386 sq mi or 247 acres) and river estuaries.

Ambrines (French pronunciation: [ɑ̃bʁin]; Picard: Ambrainne) is a commune in the Pas-de-Calais department in northern France.

== Geography ==
A farming village located 12miles (19 km) west of Arras, at the D8 and D54 road junction.

== Population ==
Historical population
Year	Pop.	±% p.a.
1968	196	—
1975	191	−0.37%
1982	167	−1.90%
1990	169	+0.15%
1999	169	+0.00%
2007	207	+2.57%
2012	245	+3.43%
2017	239	−0.49%
2023	211	−2.06%
Source: INSEE

== Sights ==
- The church of St.Leger, dating from the eighteenth century.
- A nineteenth-century chateau.

== See also ==
- Communes of the Pas-de-Calais department
