= Cambligneul =

- Commune
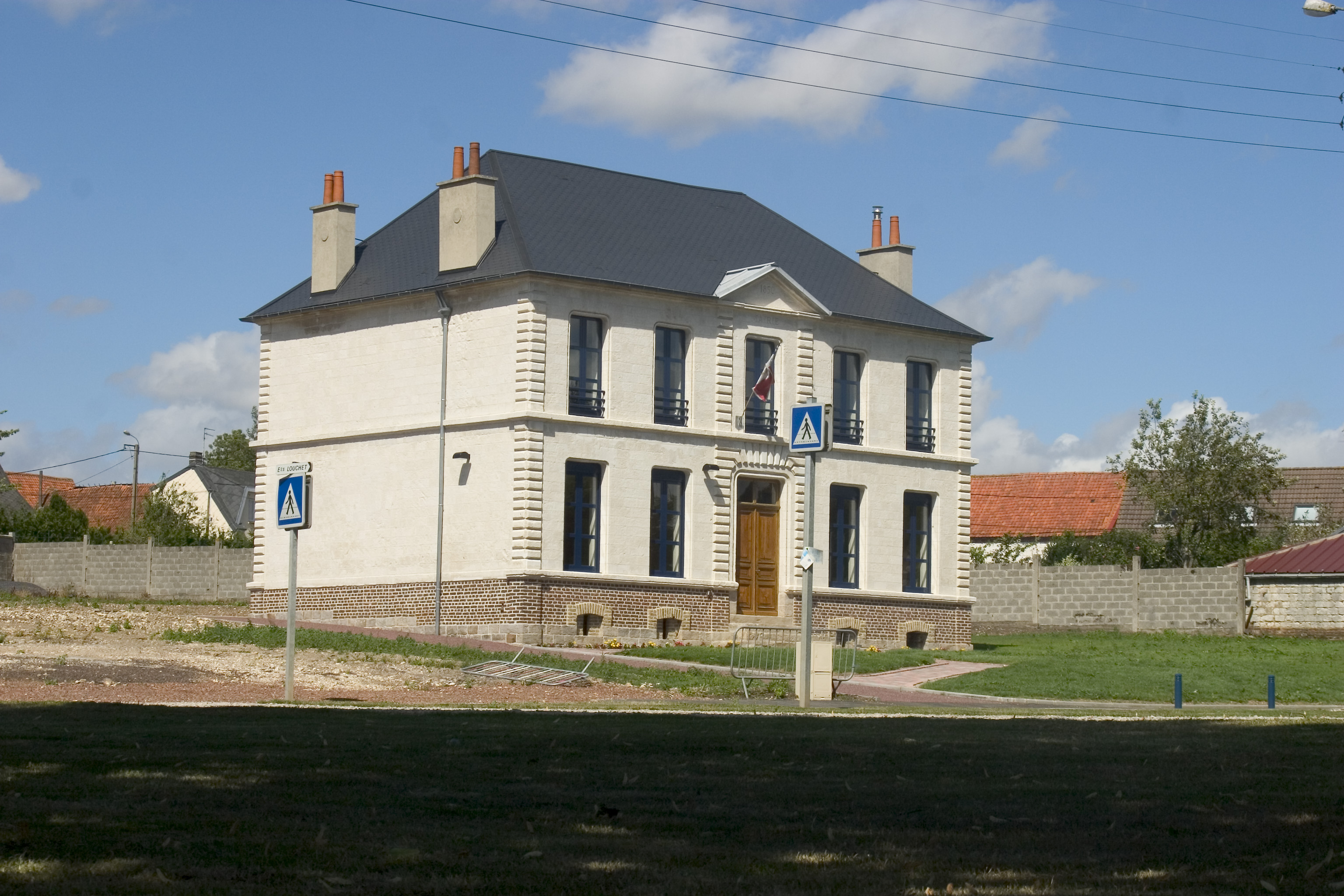
- New town hall

- Coat of arms
- Location of Cambligneul
- Location within France Location within Hauts-de-France
- Coordinates: 50°22′51″N 2°36′58″E
- Country: France
- Region: Hauts-de-France
- Department: Pas-de-Calais
- Arrondissement: Arras
- Canton: Avesnes-le-Comte
- Intercommunality: CC Campagnes de l'Artois

Government
  - Mayor (2020–2026): Jean-Luc Leuiller
- Area^{1}: 4.69 km^{2} (1.81 sq mi)
- Elevation: 136 m (446 ft)
- Highest elevation: 162 m (531 ft)
- Lowest elevation: 112 m (367 ft)
- Population (2023): 352
  - Density: 75.1/km^{2} (194/sq mi)
- Time zone: UTC+01:00 (CET)
  - Summer (DST): UTC+02:00 (CEST)
- INSEE/Postal code: 62198 /62690
- ^{1} French Land Register data, which excludes lakes, ponds, glaciers > 1 km^{2} (0.386 sq mi or 247 acres) and river estuaries.

Cambligneul (French pronunciation: [kɑ̃bliɲœl]) is a commune in the Pas-de-Calais department in the Hauts-de-France region of France 10 miles (16 km) northwest of Arras.

== Population ==
Historical population
Year	Pop.	±% p.a.
1968	250	—
1975	231	−1.12%
1982	285	+3.05%
1990	320	+1.46%
1999	323	+0.10%
2007	332	+0.34%
2012	328	−0.24%
2017	337	+0.54%
2023	352	+0.73%
Source: INSEE

== See also ==
- Communes of the Pas-de-Calais department
