= Frévin-Capelle =

- Commune
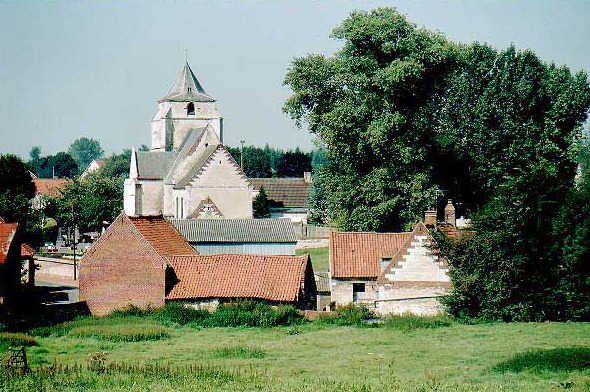
- A general view of Frévin-Capelle

- Coat of arms
- Location of Frévin-Capelle
- Location within France Location within Hauts-de-France
- Coordinates: 50°21′05″N 2°38′07″E
- Country: France
- Region: Hauts-de-France
- Department: Pas-de-Calais
- Arrondissement: Arras
- Canton: Avesnes-le-Comte
- Intercommunality: CC Campagnes de l'Artois

Government
  - Mayor (2020–2026): Philippe Carton
- Area^{1}: 3.59 km^{2} (1.39 sq mi)
- Elevation: 93 m (305 ft)
- Highest elevation: 131 m (430 ft)
- Lowest elevation: 81 m (266 ft)
- Population (2023): 400
  - Density: 110/km^{2} (290/sq mi)
- Time zone: UTC+01:00 (CET)
  - Summer (DST): UTC+02:00 (CEST)
- INSEE/Postal code: 62363 /62690
- ^{1} French Land Register data, which excludes lakes, ponds, glaciers > 1 km^{2} (0.386 sq mi or 247 acres) and river estuaries.

Frévin-Capelle (French pronunciation: [fʁevɛ̃ kapɛl]) is a commune in the Pas-de-Calais department in the Hauts-de-France region of France in the valley of the Scarpe river, 6 miles (9.7 km) northwest of Arras.

== Population ==
Historical population
Year	Pop.	±% p.a.
1968	203	—
1975	290	+5.23%
1982	395	+4.51%
1990	441	+1.39%
1999	434	−0.18%
2007	414	−0.59%
2012	374	−2.01%
2017	380	+0.32%
2023	400	+0.86%
Source: INSEE

== See also ==
- Communes of the Pas-de-Calais department
