= Pommera =

- Commune
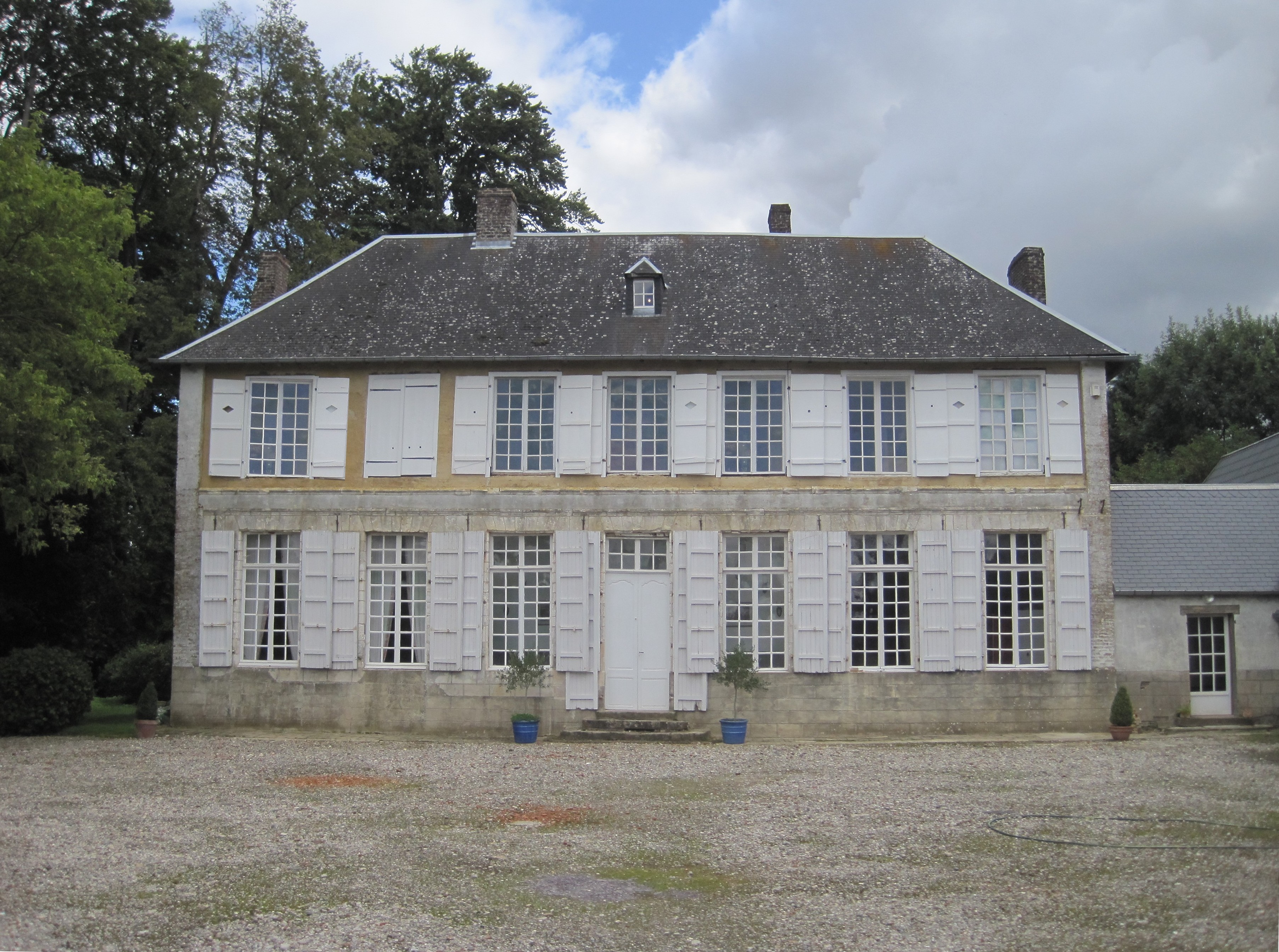
- The chateau of Pommera
- Location of Pommera
- Location within France Location within Hauts-de-France
- Coordinates: 50°10′27″N 2°26′24″E
- Country: France
- Region: Hauts-de-France
- Department: Pas-de-Calais
- Arrondissement: Arras
- Canton: Avesnes-le-Comte
- Intercommunality: CC Campagnes de l'Artois

Government
  - Mayor (2020–2026): Frédéric Plaquet
- Area^{1}: 4.42 km^{2} (1.71 sq mi)
- Elevation: 171 m (561 ft)
- Highest elevation: 167 m (548 ft)
- Lowest elevation: 130 m (430 ft)
- Population (2023): 307
  - Density: 69.5/km^{2} (180/sq mi)
- Time zone: UTC+01:00 (CET)
  - Summer (DST): UTC+02:00 (CEST)
- INSEE/Postal code: 62663 /62760
- ^{1} French Land Register data, which excludes lakes, ponds, glaciers > 1 km^{2} (0.386 sq mi or 247 acres) and river estuaries.

Pommera (French pronunciation: [pɔmʁa]) is a commune in the Pas-de-Calais department in the Hauts-de-France region of France.

== Geography ==
Pommera is situated 20 miles (32 km) southwest of Arras, on the N25 road.

== Population ==
Historical population
Year	Pop.	±% p.a.
1968	293	—
1975	277	−0.80%
1982	260	−0.90%
1990	238	−1.10%
1999	245	+0.32%
2007	289	+2.09%
2012	322	+2.19%
2017	306	−1.01%
2023	307	+0.05%
Source: INSEE

== Places of interest ==
- The church of St.Marguerite, dating from the nineteenth century.
- The 18th century Château de Pommera
- The Château de Grena dating from the eighteenth century.
- A chapel.

== See also ==
- Communes of the Pas-de-Calais department
