= Sombrin =

- Commune
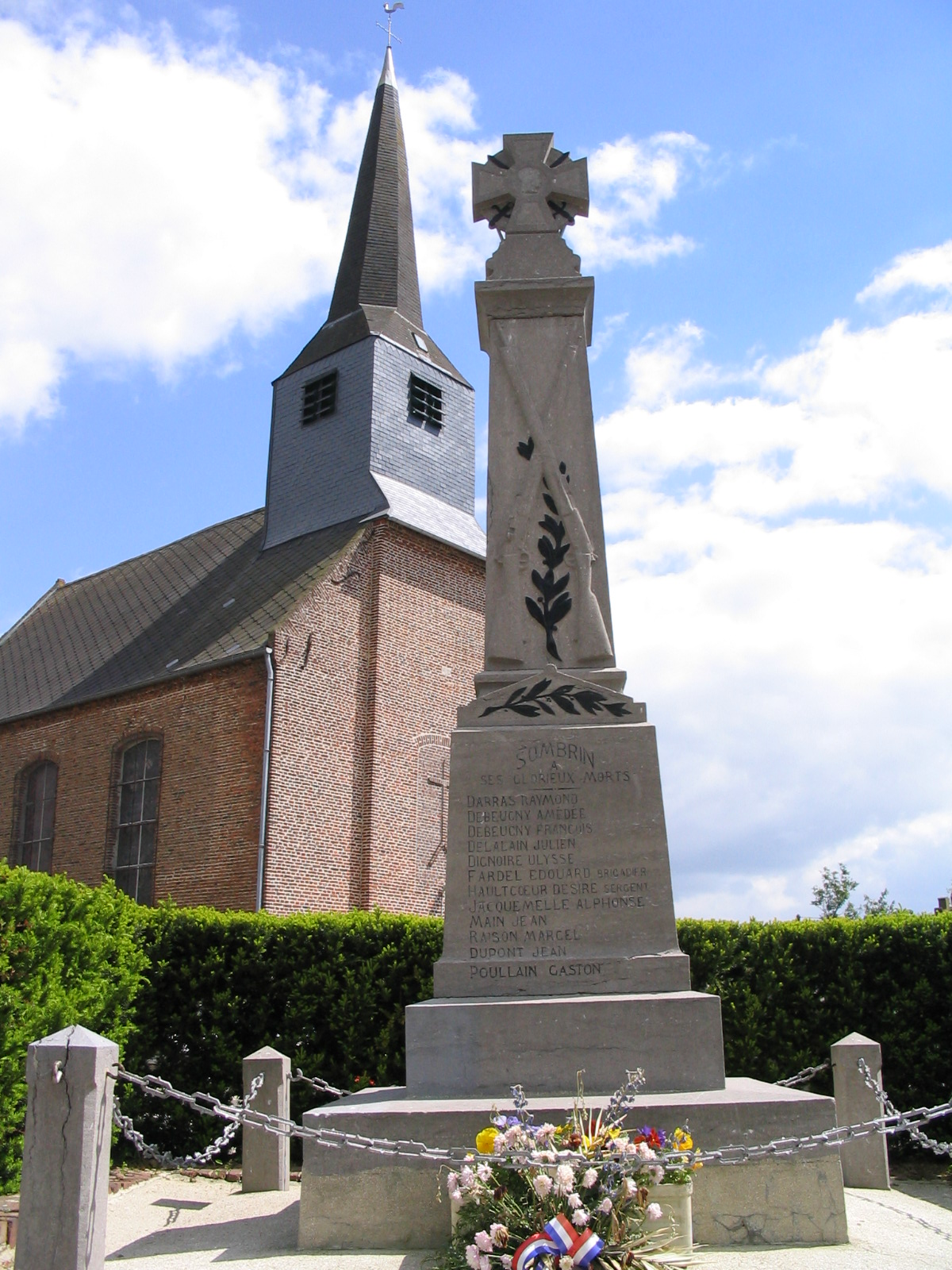
- Sombrin's church and monument to the dead

- Coat of arms
- Location of Sombrin
- Location within France Location within Hauts-de-France
- Coordinates: 50°14′26″N 2°30′06″E
- Country: France
- Region: Hauts-de-France
- Department: Pas-de-Calais
- Arrondissement: Arras
- Canton: Avesnes-le-Comte
- Intercommunality: CC Campagnes de l'Artois

Government
  - Mayor (2020–2026): Henri Cuvillier
- Area^{1}: 6.61 km^{2} (2.55 sq mi)
- Elevation: 159 m (522 ft)
- Highest elevation: 172 m (564 ft)
- Lowest elevation: 135 m (443 ft)
- Population (2023): 205
  - Density: 31.0/km^{2} (80.3/sq mi)
- Time zone: UTC+01:00 (CET)
  - Summer (DST): UTC+02:00 (CEST)
- INSEE/Postal code: 62798 /62810
- ^{1} French Land Register data, which excludes lakes, ponds, glaciers > 1 km^{2} (0.386 sq mi or 247 acres) and river estuaries.

Sombrin (French pronunciation: [sɔ̃bʁɛ̃]) is a commune in the Pas-de-Calais department in the Hauts-de-France region of France 14 miles (23 km) southwest of Arras.

== Population ==
Historical population
Year	Pop.	±% p.a.
1968	222	—
1975	204	−1.20%
1982	220	+1.08%
1990	227	+0.39%
1999	235	+0.39%
2007	240	+0.26%
2012	246	+0.50%
2017	240	−0.49%
2023	205	−2.59%
Source: INSEE

== See also ==
- Communes of the Pas-de-Calais department
