= Halloy, Pas-de-Calais =

Halloy
- Commune
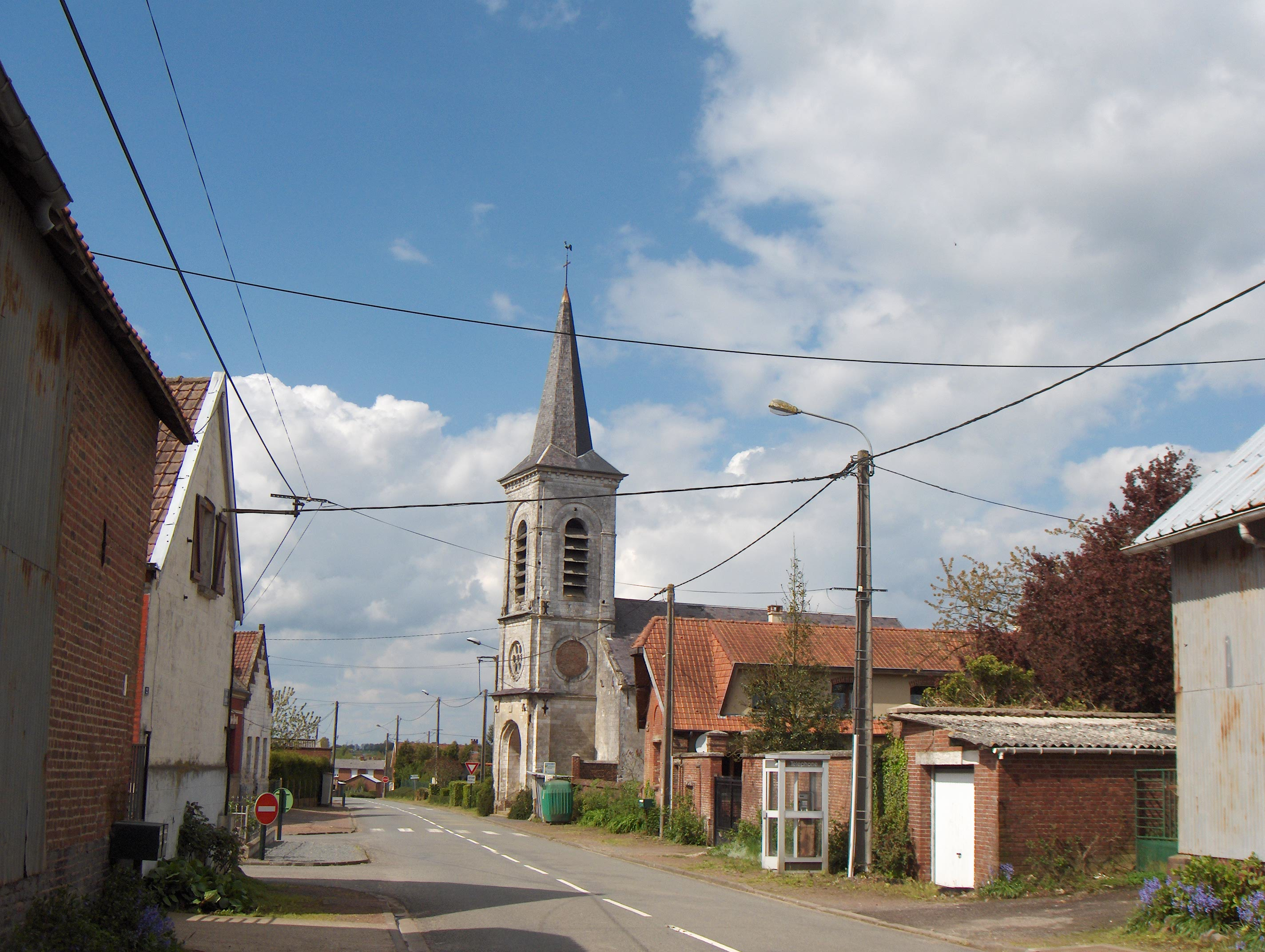
- The church of Halloy

- Coat of arms
- Location of Halloy
- Location within France Location within Hauts-de-France
- Coordinates: 50°09′30″N 2°25′36″E
- Country: France
- Region: Hauts-de-France
- Department: Pas-de-Calais
- Arrondissement: Arras
- Canton: Avesnes-le-Comte
- Intercommunality: CC Campagnes de l'Artois

Government
  - Mayor (2020–2026): Jean-Louis Cauvet
- Area^{1}: 3.4 km^{2} (1.3 sq mi)
- Elevation: 147 m (482 ft)
- Highest elevation: 158 m (518 ft)
- Lowest elevation: 115 m (377 ft)
- Population (2023): 201
  - Density: 59/km^{2} (150/sq mi)
- Time zone: UTC+01:00 (CET)
  - Summer (DST): UTC+02:00 (CEST)
- INSEE/Postal code: 62404 /62760
- ^{1} French Land Register data, which excludes lakes, ponds, glaciers > 1 km^{2} (0.386 sq mi or 247 acres) and river estuaries.

Halloy (French pronunciation: [alwa]) is a commune in the Pas-de-Calais department in the Hauts-de-France region of France.

== Geography ==
A small farming village situated 20 miles (32 km) southwest of Arras, on the D24 road.

== Population ==
Historical population
Year	Pop.	±% p.a.
1968	286	—
1975	259	−1.41%
1982	250	−0.50%
1990	223	−1.42%
1999	209	−0.72%
2007	228	+1.09%
2012	236	+0.69%
2017	217	−1.66%
2023	201	−1.27%
Source: INSEE

== Places of interest ==
- The church of St. Eloi, dating from the nineteenth century.

== See also ==
- Communes of the Pas-de-Calais department
