= Givenchy-le-Noble =

- Commune
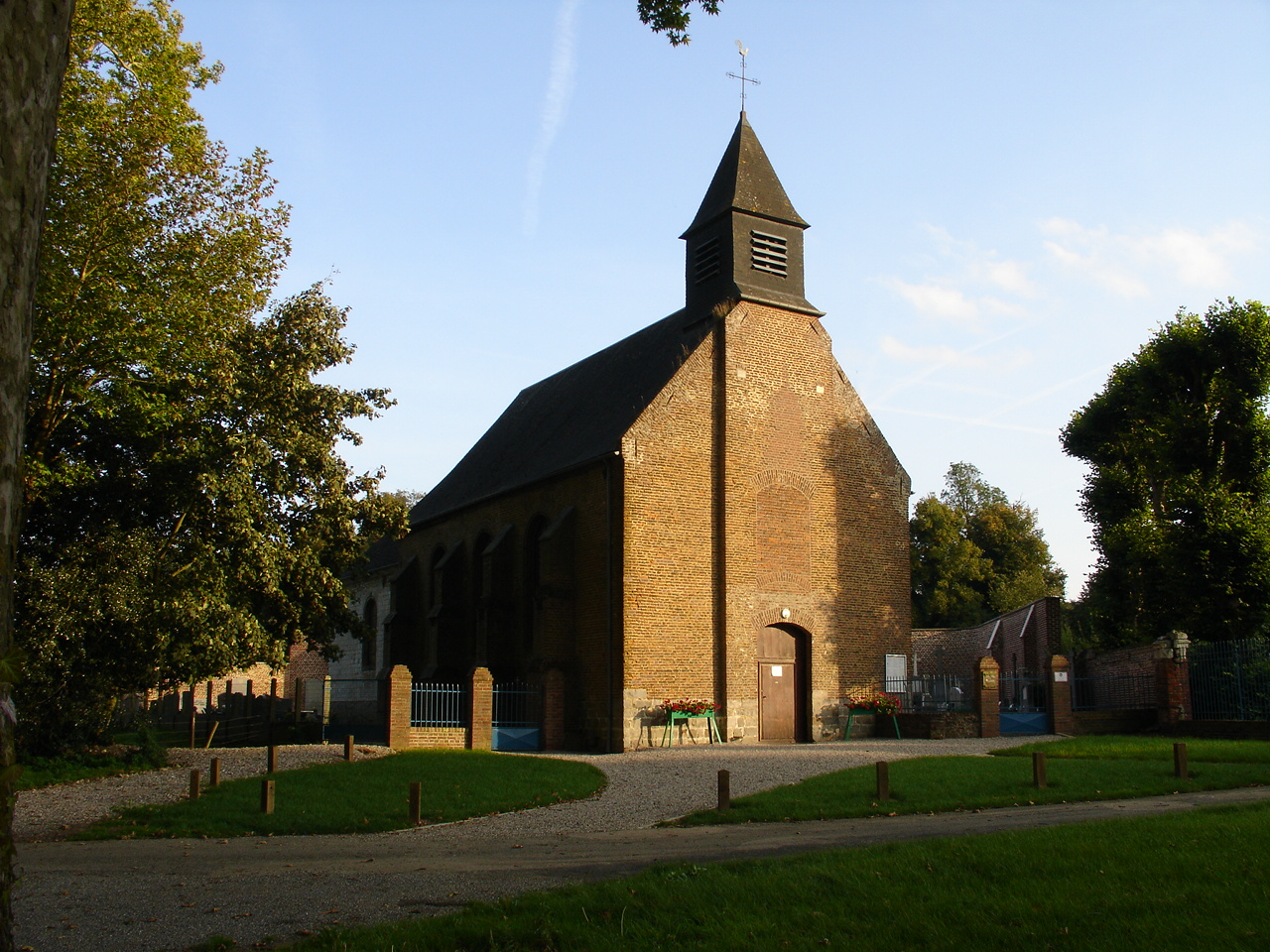
- The church of Givenchy-le-Noble

- Coat of arms
- Location of Givenchy-le-Noble
- Location within France Location within Hauts-de-France
- Coordinates: 50°18′08″N 2°29′50″E
- Country: France
- Region: Hauts-de-France
- Department: Pas-de-Calais
- Arrondissement: Arras
- Canton: Avesnes-le-Comte
- Intercommunality: CC Campagnes de l'Artois

Government
  - Mayor (2020–2026): Philippe Lefebvre
- Area^{1}: 2.52 km^{2} (0.97 sq mi)
- Elevation: 125 m (410 ft)
- Highest elevation: 147 m (482 ft)
- Lowest elevation: 120 m (390 ft)
- Population (2023): 155
  - Density: 61.5/km^{2} (159/sq mi)
- Time zone: UTC+01:00 (CET)
  - Summer (DST): UTC+02:00 (CEST)
- INSEE/Postal code: 62372 /62810
- ^{1} French Land Register data, which excludes lakes, ponds, glaciers > 1 km^{2} (0.386 sq mi or 247 acres) and river estuaries.

Givenchy-le-Noble (French pronunciation: [ʒivɑ̃ʃi lə nɔbl]; Picard: Givinchy-ch’Nobe) is a commune in the Pas-de-Calais department in the Hauts-de-France region of France 14 miles (23 km) west of Arras.

== Population ==
Historical population
Year	Pop.	±% p.a.
1968	144	—
1975	134	−1.02%
1982	160	+2.57%
1990	158	−0.16%
1999	146	−0.87%
2007	142	−0.35%
2012	147	+0.69%
2017	150	+0.40%
2023	155	+0.55%
Source: INSEE

== See also ==
- Communes of the Pas-de-Calais department
