= Gaudiempré =

- Commune
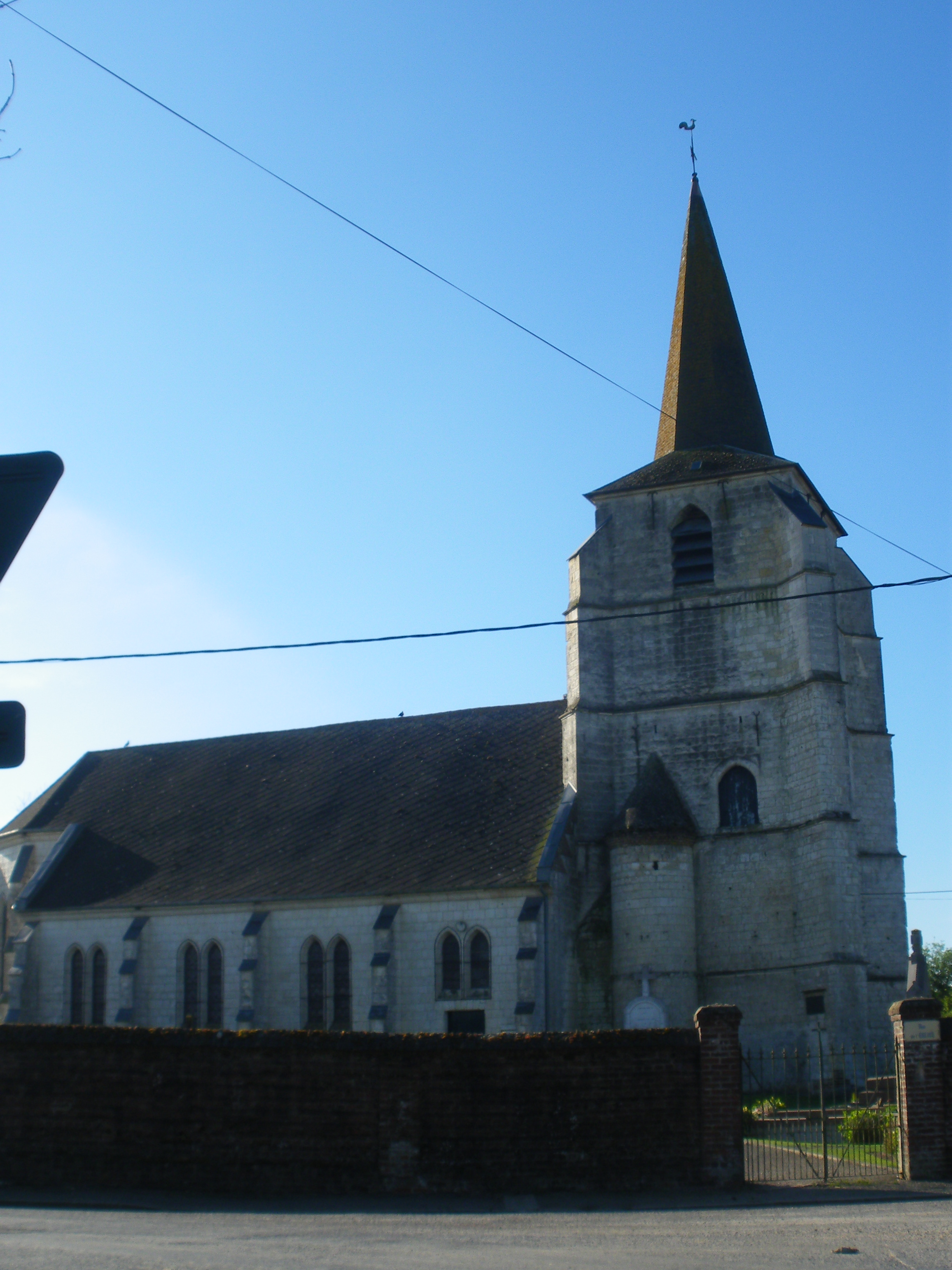
- The church of Gaudiempré

- Coat of arms
- Location of Gaudiempré
- Location within France Location within Hauts-de-France
- Coordinates: 50°10′43″N 2°31′52″E
- Country: France
- Region: Hauts-de-France
- Department: Pas-de-Calais
- Arrondissement: Arras
- Canton: Avesnes-le-Comte
- Intercommunality: CC Campagnes de l'Artois

Government
  - Mayor (2020–2026): Luc Delaporte
- Area^{1}: 6.26 km^{2} (2.42 sq mi)
- Elevation: 158 m (518 ft)
- Highest elevation: 169 m (554 ft)
- Lowest elevation: 114 m (374 ft)
- Population (2023): 215
  - Density: 34.3/km^{2} (89.0/sq mi)
- Time zone: UTC+01:00 (CET)
  - Summer (DST): UTC+02:00 (CEST)
- INSEE/Postal code: 62368 /62760
- ^{1} French Land Register data, which excludes lakes, ponds, glaciers > 1 km^{2} (0.386 sq mi or 247 acres) and river estuaries.

Gaudiempré is a commune in the Pas-de-Calais department in the Hauts-de-France region of France.

== Geography ==
Gaudiempré is a small farming village situated 14 miles (23 km) southwest of Arras, at the junction of the D23 and the D1 roads.

== Population ==
Historical population
Year	Pop.	±% p.a.
1968	263	—
1975	225	−2.20%
1982	205	−1.32%
1990	182	−1.48%
1999	187	+0.30%
2007	177	−0.68%
2012	190	+1.43%
2017	199	+0.93%
2023	215	+1.30%
Source: INSEE

== Places of interest ==
- The church of St.Nicholas, dating from the seventeenth century.

== See also ==
- Communes of the Pas-de-Calais department
