= Tilloy-lès-Hermaville =

- Commune
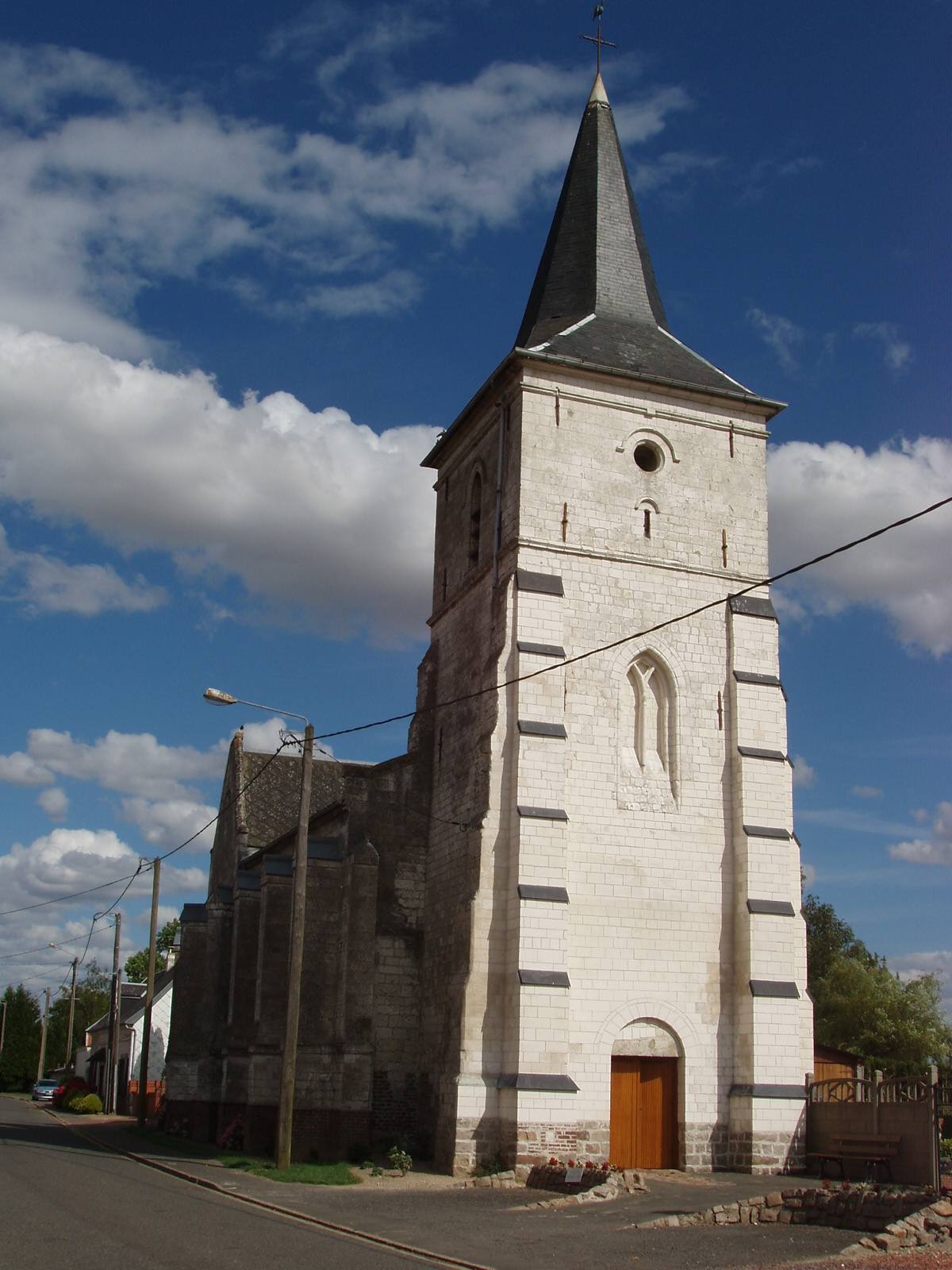
- The church of Tilloy-lès-Hermaville
- Location of Tilloy-lès-Hermaville
- Location within France Location within Hauts-de-France
- Coordinates: 50°19′40″N 2°33′29″E
- Country: France
- Region: Hauts-de-France
- Department: Pas-de-Calais
- Arrondissement: Arras
- Canton: Avesnes-le-Comte
- Intercommunality: CC Campagnes de l'Artois

Government
  - Mayor (2020–2026): David Duchateau
- Area^{1}: 2.87 km^{2} (1.11 sq mi)
- Elevation: 118 m (387 ft)
- Highest elevation: 138 m (453 ft)
- Lowest elevation: 99 m (325 ft)
- Population (2023): 215
  - Density: 74.9/km^{2} (194/sq mi)
- Time zone: UTC+01:00 (CET)
  - Summer (DST): UTC+02:00 (CEST)
- INSEE/Postal code: 62816 /62690
- ^{1} French Land Register data, which excludes lakes, ponds, glaciers > 1 km^{2} (0.386 sq mi or 247 acres) and river estuaries.

Tilloy-lès-Hermaville is a commune in the Pas-de-Calais department in the Hauts-de-France region of France 9 miles (14 km) west of Arras.

== Population ==
Historical population
Year	Pop.	±% p.a.
1968	139	—
1975	137	−0.21%
1982	149	+1.21%
1990	186	+2.81%
1999	178	−0.49%
2007	211	+2.15%
2012	229	+1.65%
2017	223	−0.53%
2023	215	−0.61%
Source: INSEE

== See also ==
- Communes of the Pas-de-Calais department
