= Camblain-l'Abbé =

Camblain-l’Abbé
- Commune
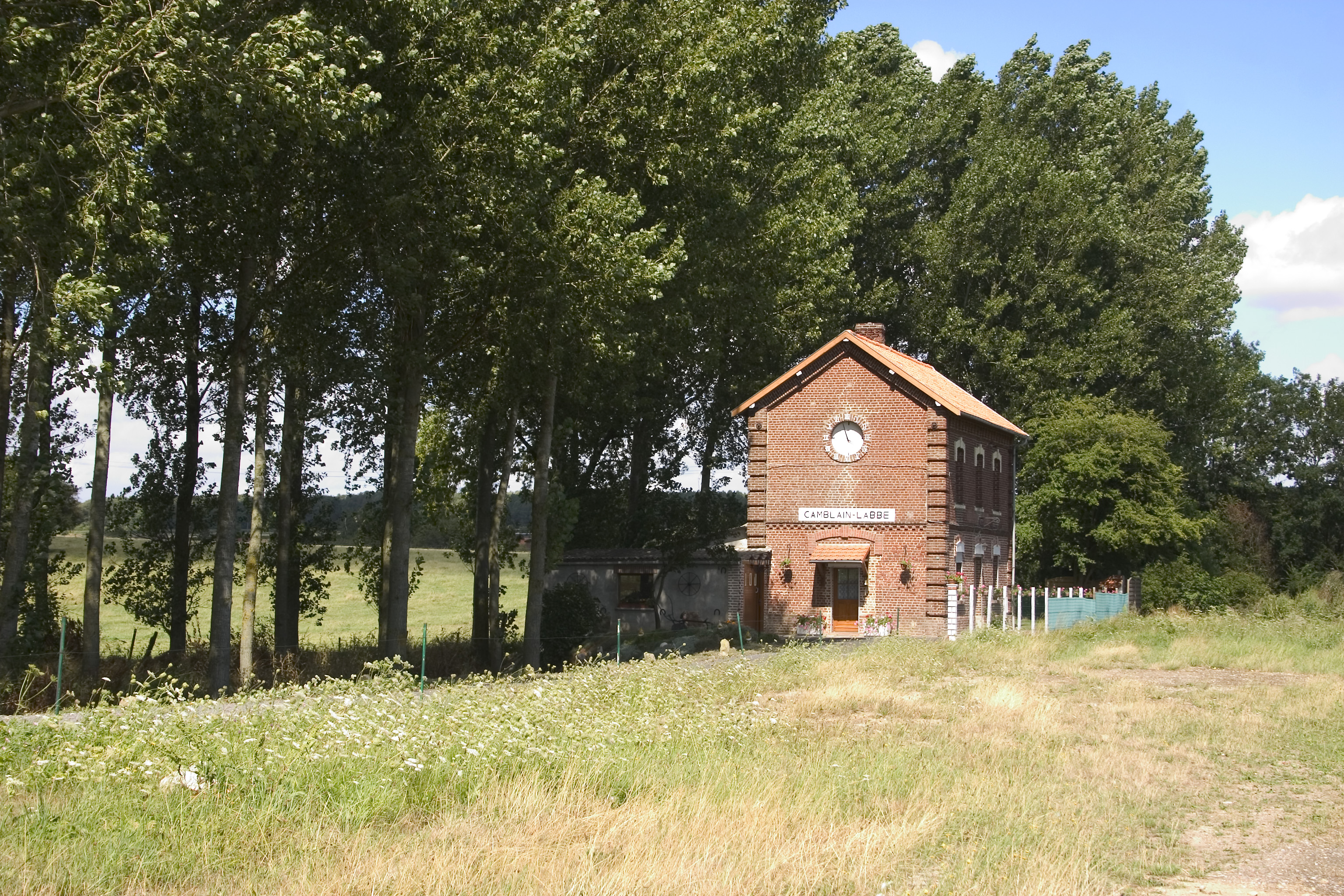
- Old railroad station

- Coat of arms
- Location of Camblain-l’Abbé
- Location within France Location within Hauts-de-France
- Coordinates: 50°22′26″N 2°38′16″E
- Country: France
- Region: Hauts-de-France
- Department: Pas-de-Calais
- Arrondissement: Arras
- Canton: Avesnes-le-Comte
- Intercommunality: CC Campagnes de l'Artois

Government
  - Mayor (2020–2026): Monique Debeaumont
- Area^{1}: 5.61 km^{2} (2.17 sq mi)
- Elevation: 112 m (367 ft)
- Highest elevation: 161 m (528 ft)
- Lowest elevation: 103 m (338 ft)
- Population (2023): 683
  - Density: 122/km^{2} (315/sq mi)
- Time zone: UTC+01:00 (CET)
  - Summer (DST): UTC+02:00 (CEST)
- INSEE/Postal code: 62199 /62690
- ^{1} French Land Register data, which excludes lakes, ponds, glaciers > 1 km^{2} (0.386 sq mi or 247 acres) and river estuaries.

Camblain-l’Abbé (French pronunciation: [kɑ̃blɛ̃ labe]; Picard: Camblin-l'Abbé) is a commune in the Pas-de-Calais department in the Hauts-de-France region of France.

== Geography ==
A farming village located 9 miles (15 km) northwest of Arras at the junction of the D341 with the D73E.

== Population ==
Historical population
Year	Pop.	±% p.a.
1968	390	—
1975	448	+2.00%
1982	561	+3.27%
1990	615	+1.16%
1999	653	+0.67%
2007	645	−0.15%
2012	625	−0.63%
2017	650	+0.79%
2023	683	+0.83%
Source: INSEE

== Places of interest ==
- The church of St.Pierre, dating from the sixteenth century.

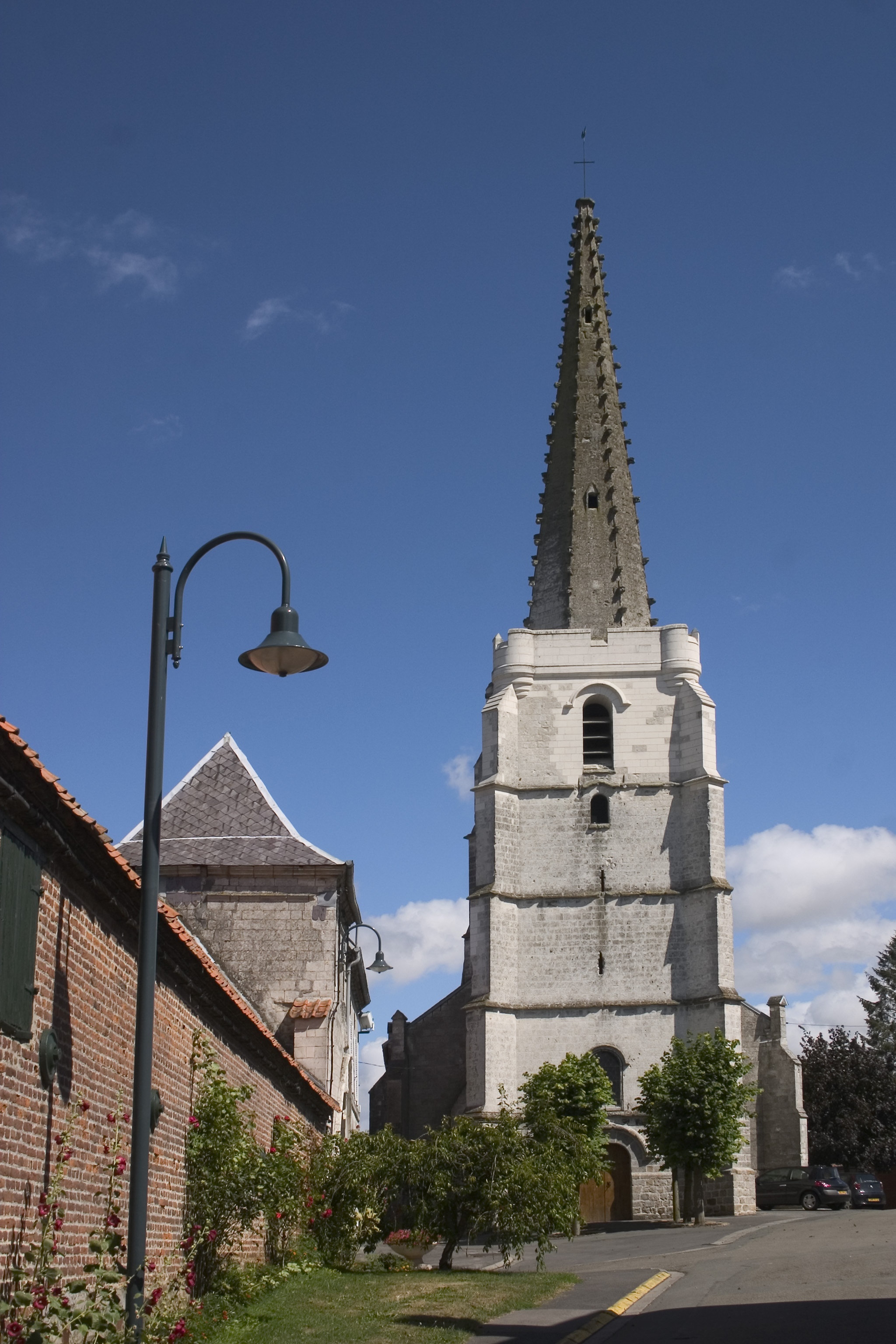
The church

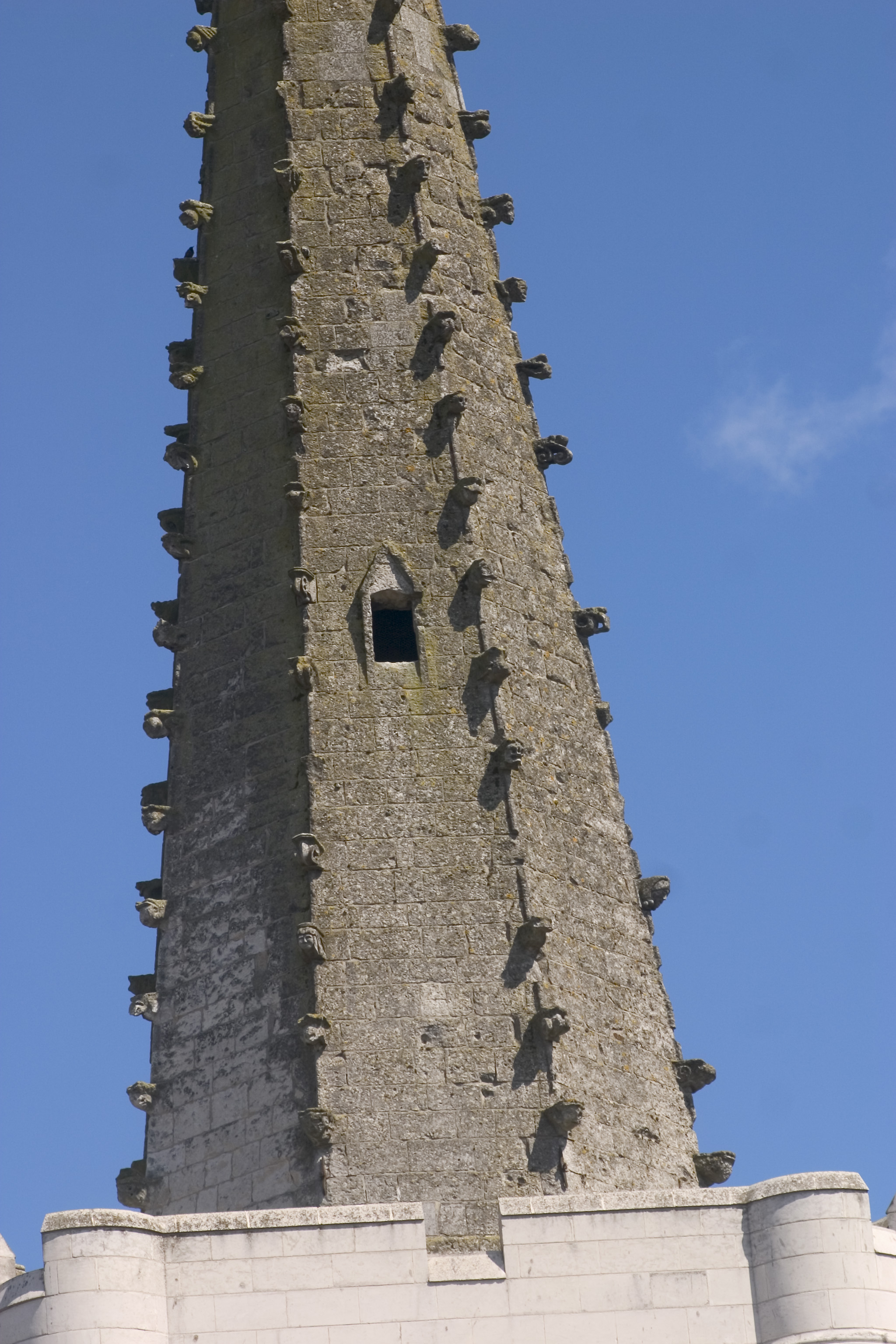
Details of the church spire

== See also ==
- Communes of the Pas-de-Calais department
