= Magnicourt-en-Comte =

Magnicourt-en-Comté
- Commune
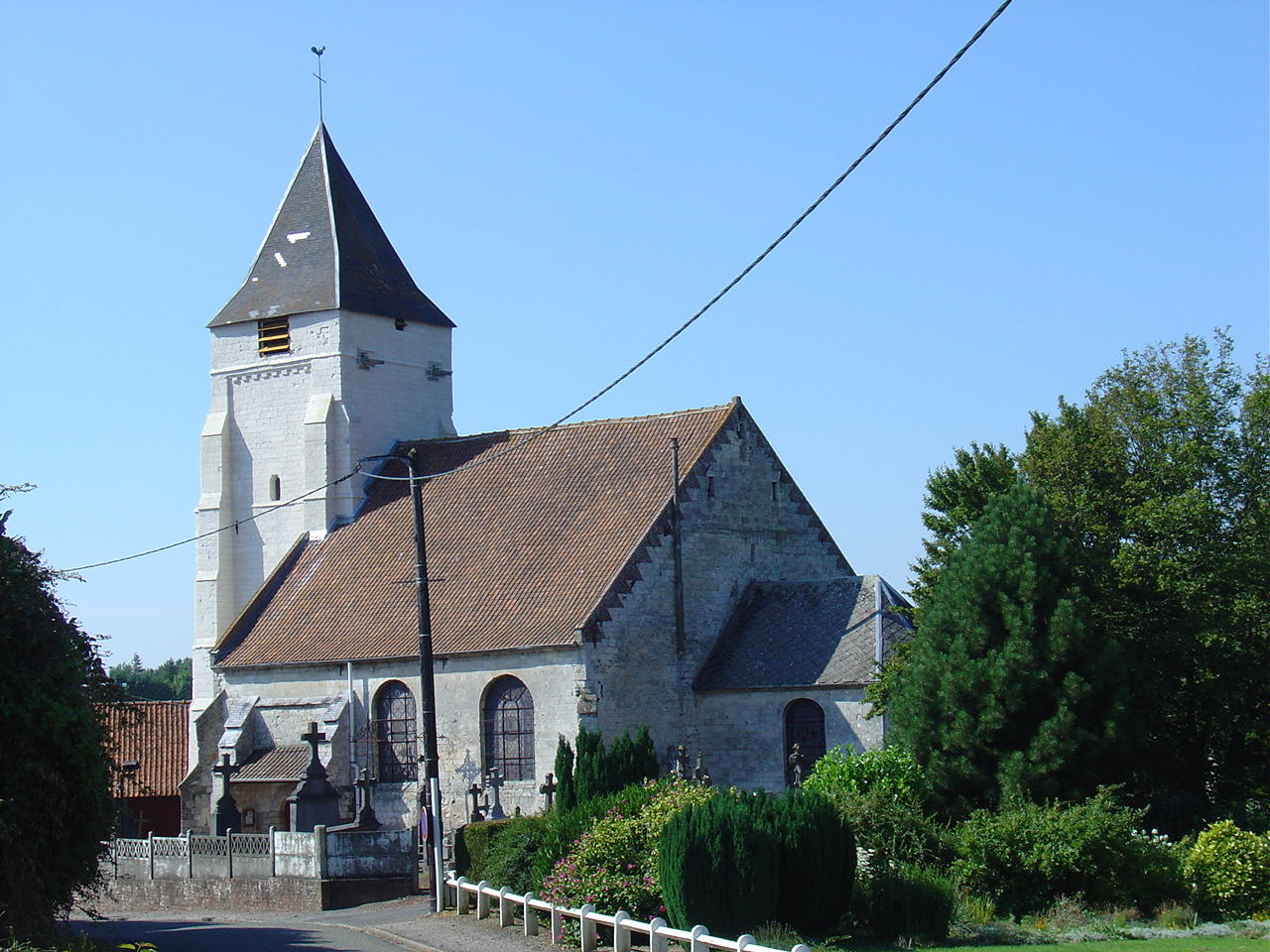
- The church of Magnicourt-en-Comté

- Coat of arms
- Location of Magnicourt-en-Comté
- Location within France Location within Hauts-de-France
- Coordinates: 50°24′06″N 2°29′32″E
- Country: France
- Region: Hauts-de-France
- Department: Pas-de-Calais
- Arrondissement: Arras
- Canton: Avesnes-le-Comte
- Intercommunality: CC Campagnes de l'Artois

Government
  - Mayor (2020–2026): Pierre Guillemant
- Area^{1}: 9.86 km^{2} (3.81 sq mi)
- Elevation: 98 m (322 ft)
- Highest elevation: 181 m (594 ft)
- Lowest elevation: 86 m (282 ft)
- Population (2023): 647
  - Density: 65.6/km^{2} (170/sq mi)
- Time zone: UTC+01:00 (CET)
  - Summer (DST): UTC+02:00 (CEST)
- INSEE/Postal code: 62536 /62127
- ^{1} French Land Register data, which excludes lakes, ponds, glaciers > 1 km^{2} (0.386 sq mi or 247 acres) and river estuaries.

Magnicourt-en-Comte (French pronunciation: [maɲikuʁ ɑ̃ kɔ̃t]; Picard: Magnicourt-in-Comté) is a commune in the Pas-de-Calais department in the Hauts-de-France region of France.

== Geography ==
Magnicourt-en-Comte is situated 17 miles (27 km) northwest of Arras, at the junction of the D83, D86 and the D74 roads.

== Population ==
Historical population
Year	Pop.	±% p.a.
1968	576	—
1975	567	−0.22%
1982	608	+1.00%
1990	606	−0.04%
1999	553	−1.01%
2007	624	+1.52%
2012	609	−0.49%
2017	649	+1.28%
2023	647	−0.05%
Source: INSEE

== Places of interest ==
- The church of St.Leger, dating from the twelfth century.
- The remains of an old chateau, destroyed in 1639.
- Watermills

== See also ==
- Communes of the Pas-de-Calais department
