= Amplier =

- Commune
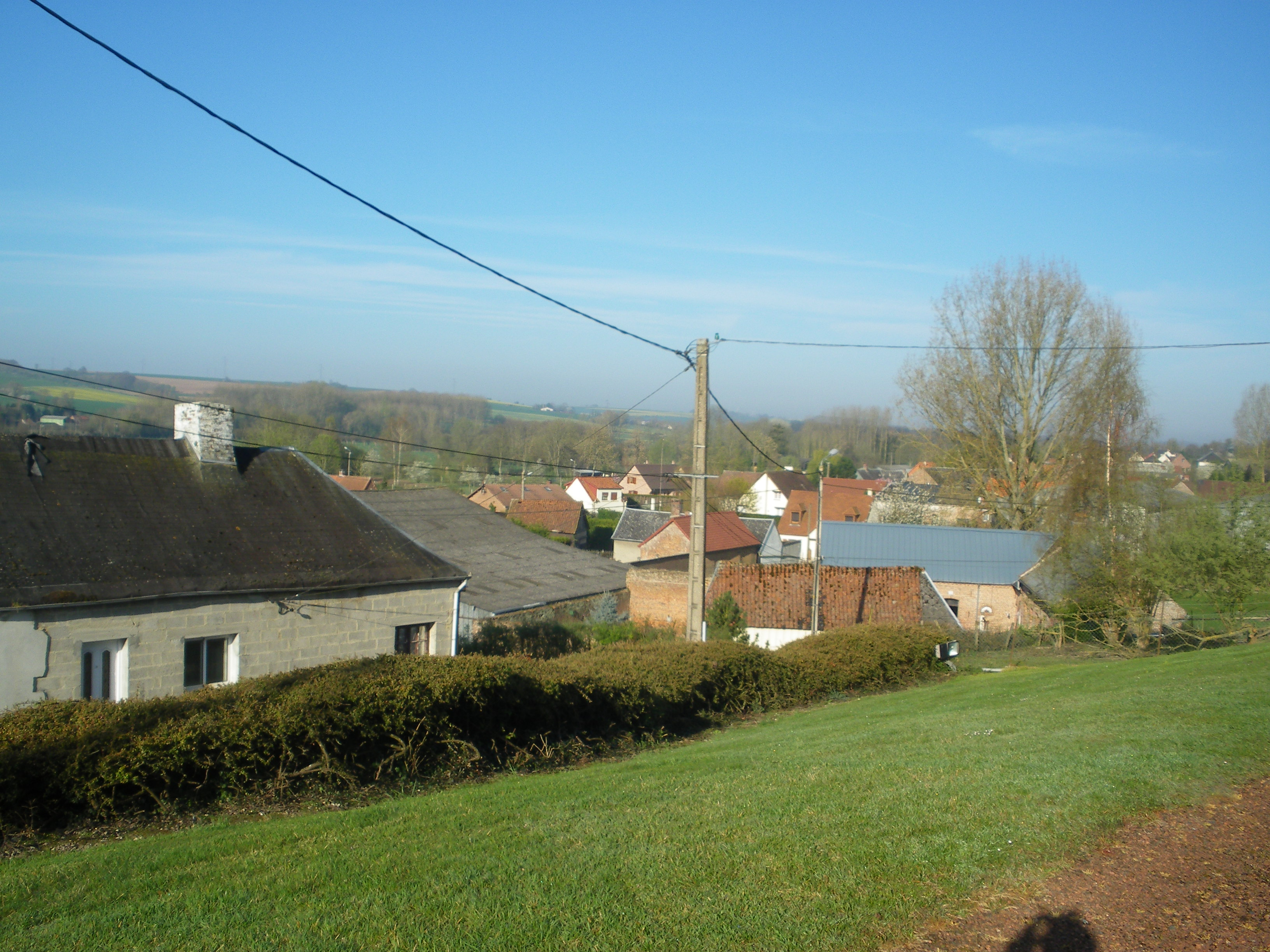
- A general view of Amplier

- Coat of arms
- Location of Amplier
- Location within France Location within Hauts-de-France
- Coordinates: 50°08′18″N 2°24′02″E
- Country: France
- Region: Hauts-de-France
- Department: Pas-de-Calais
- Arrondissement: Arras
- Canton: Avesnes-le-Comte
- Intercommunality: CC Campagnes de l'Artois

Government
  - Mayor (2020–2026): Hubert Tassencourt
- Area^{1}: 8.71 km^{2} (3.36 sq mi)
- Elevation: 66 m (217 ft)
- Highest elevation: 148 m (486 ft)
- Lowest elevation: 61 m (200 ft)
- Population (2023): 297
  - Density: 34.1/km^{2} (88.3/sq mi)
- Time zone: UTC+01:00 (CET)
  - Summer (DST): UTC+02:00 (CEST)
- INSEE/Postal code: 62030 /62760
- ^{1} French Land Register data, which excludes lakes, ponds, glaciers > 1 km^{2} (0.386 sq mi or 247 acres) and river estuaries.

Amplier (French pronunciation: [ɑ̃plije]) is a commune in the Pas-de-Calais department in northern France.

== Geography ==
A farming village located in the Authie valley (the border with the Somme department), 20 miles (32 km) southwest of Arras, on the D24 road.

== Population ==
Historical population
Year	Pop.	±% p.a.
1968	273	—
1975	261	−0.64%
1982	230	−1.79%
1990	271	+2.07%
1999	248	−0.98%
2007	291	+2.02%
2012	318	+1.79%
2017	302	−1.03%
2023	297	−0.28%
Source: INSEE

== Sights ==
- The church of St. Hilaire, dating from the eighteenth century.

== See also ==
- Communes of the Pas-de-Calais department
