= Barly, Pas-de-Calais =

Barly
- Commune
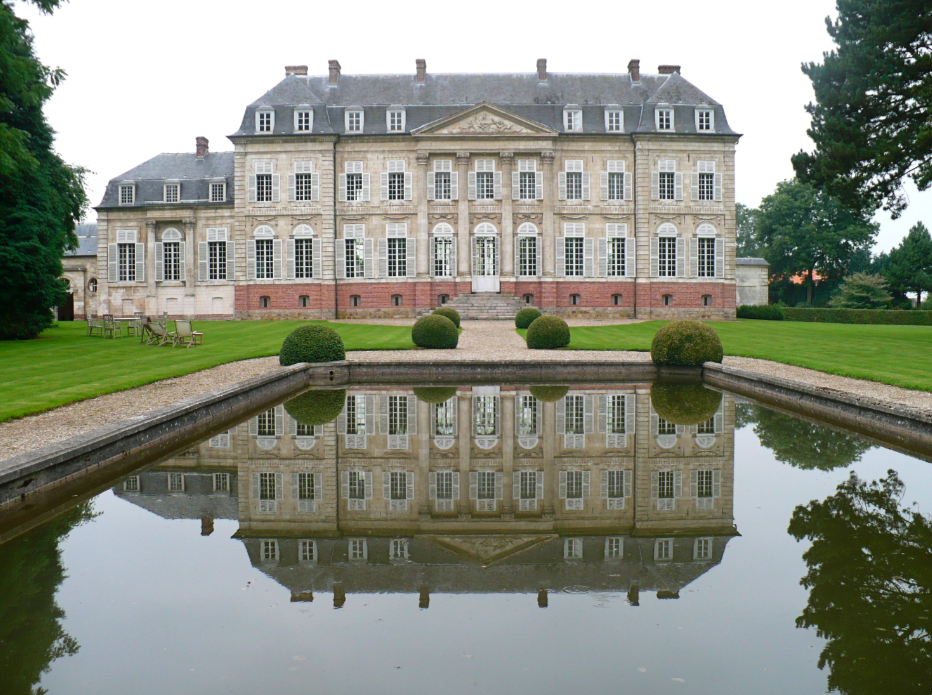
- The chateau of Barly

- Coat of arms
- Location of Barly
- Location within France Location within Hauts-de-France
- Coordinates: 50°15′01″N 2°32′52″E
- Country: France
- Region: Hauts-de-France
- Department: Pas-de-Calais
- Arrondissement: Arras
- Canton: Avesnes-le-Comte
- Intercommunality: CC Campagnes de l'Artois

Government
  - Mayor (2020–2026): Marie-Angèle Lefetz
- Area^{1}: 6.15 km^{2} (2.37 sq mi)
- Elevation: 140 m (460 ft)
- Highest elevation: 161 m (528 ft)
- Lowest elevation: 107 m (351 ft)
- Population (2023): 199
  - Density: 32.4/km^{2} (83.8/sq mi)
- Time zone: UTC+01:00 (CET)
  - Summer (DST): UTC+02:00 (CEST)
- INSEE/Postal code: 62084 /62810
- ^{1} French Land Register data, which excludes lakes, ponds, glaciers > 1 km^{2} (0.386 sq mi or 247 acres) and river estuaries.

Barly (French pronunciation: [baʁli]) is a commune in the Pas-de-Calais department in the Hauts-de-France region in northern France.

== Geography ==
A farming village located 12 miles (19 km) southwest of Arras on the D8, D26 and D59 road junction.

== Population ==
Historical population
Year	Pop.	±% p.a.
1968	265	—
1975	245	−1.11%
1982	275	+1.66%
1990	282	+0.31%
1999	268	−0.56%
2007	245	−1.12%
2012	221	−2.04%
2017	221	+0.00%
2023	199	−1.73%
Source: INSEE

== Sights ==
- The church of St. Leger, dating from the sixteenth century.
- The war cemetery.

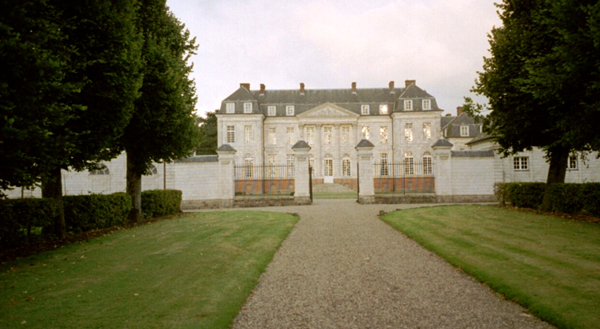

- The eighteenth-century chateau was built between 1782 and 1784 by Vindicien-Antoine Blin, a former captain of the Rohan regiment. The work on the interior layout and the construction of outbuildings was continued until 1794 by his son, Jean-Vindicien Blin of Varlemont. He remained in Barly during the French Revolution and between 1812 and 1818 made the castle available to the bishop of Arras during the summer. After his death in 1832, his son sold the castle to the Countess of Tramecourt, who bequeathed it in 1879 to the Marquis du Luart. Owned by a Monsieur Duhem from 1914 to 1937, it was occupied by the Germans during the last war.

Left in a poor state when it was acquired in 1970 by Count Jacques d'Antin de Vaillac, the chateau has benefitted from considerable restoration with the help of the Historical Monuments of France.

== See also ==
- Communes of the Pas-de-Calais department
