= Famechon, Pas-de-Calais =

Famechon
- Commune
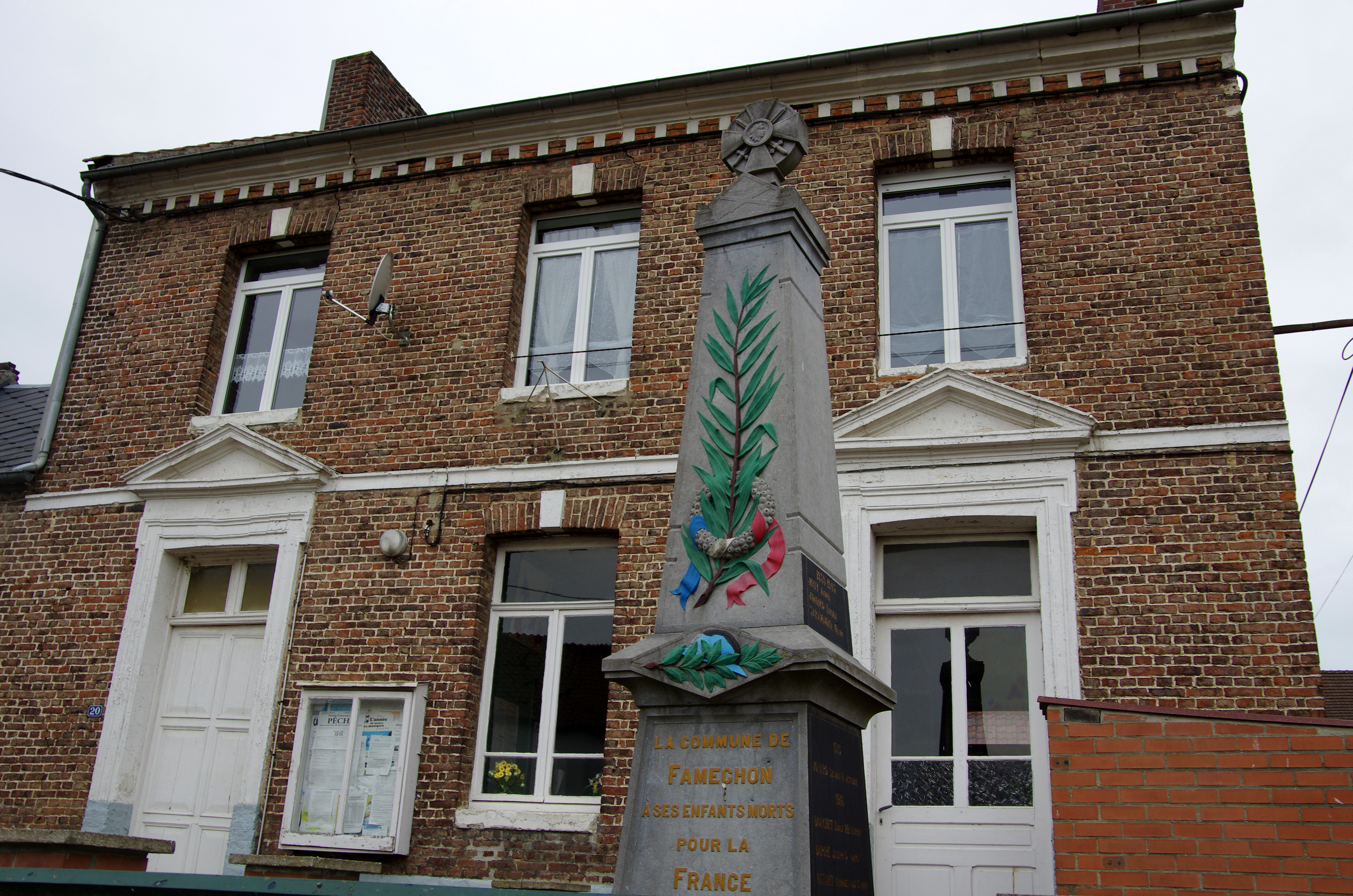
- The town hall of Famechon

- Coat of arms
- Location of Famechon
- Location within France Location within Hauts-de-France
- Coordinates: 50°08′35″N 2°28′07″E
- Country: France
- Region: Hauts-de-France
- Department: Pas-de-Calais
- Arrondissement: Arras
- Canton: Avesnes-le-Comte
- Intercommunality: CC Campagnes de l'Artois

Government
  - Mayor (2020–2026): Sébastien Henquenet
- Area^{1}: 4.61 km^{2} (1.78 sq mi)
- Elevation: 87 m (285 ft)
- Highest elevation: 152 m (499 ft)
- Lowest elevation: 72 m (236 ft)
- Population (2023): 111
  - Density: 24.1/km^{2} (62.4/sq mi)
- Time zone: UTC+01:00 (CET)
  - Summer (DST): UTC+02:00 (CEST)
- INSEE/Postal code: 62322 /62760
- ^{1} French Land Register data, which excludes lakes, ponds, glaciers > 1 km^{2} (0.386 sq mi or 247 acres) and river estuaries.

Famechon (French pronunciation: [famʃɔ̃]) is a commune in the Pas-de-Calais department in the Hauts-de-France region of France 22 miles (35 km) southwest of Arras.

== Population ==
Historical population
Year	Pop.	±% p.a.
1968	164	—
1975	147	−1.55%
1982	138	−0.90%
1990	141	+0.27%
1999	139	−0.16%
2007	126	−1.22%
2012	116	−1.64%
2017	120	+0.68%
2023	111	−1.29%
Source: INSEE

== See also ==
- Communes of the Pas-de-Calais department
