= Canton of Pas-en-Artois =

Coordinates: 50°09′05″N 2°31′57″E

Pas-en-Artois
- Former canton
- Interactive map of Pas-en-Artois
- Country: France
- Region: Hauts-de-France
- Department: Pas-de-Calais
- No. of communes: {{{nbcomm}}}
- Disbanded: 2015
- Area: 15.64 km^{2} (6.04 sq mi)
- Population (2012): 7,678
  - Density: 490.9/km^{2} (1,271/sq mi)

The Canton of Pas-en-Artois is a former canton situated in the department of the Pas-de-Calais and in the Nord-Pas-de-Calais region of northern France. It was disbanded following the French canton reorganisation which came into effect in March 2015. It consisted of 25 communes, which joined the canton of Avesnes-le-Comte in 2015. It had a total of 7,678 inhabitants (2012).

== Geography ==
The canton is organised around Pas-en-Artois in the arrondissement of Arras. The altitude varies from 61m (Amplier) to 172m (Humbercamps) for an average altitude of 128m.

The canton comprised 25 communes:

- Amplier
- Bienvillers-au-Bois
- Couin
- Famechon
- Foncquevillers
- Gaudiempré
- Gommecourt
- Grincourt-lès-Pas
- Halloy
- Hannescamps
- Hébuterne
- Hénu
- Humbercamps
- Mondicourt
- Orville
- Pas-en-Artois
- Pommera
- Pommier
- Puisieux
- Sailly-au-Bois
- Saint-Amand
- Sarton
- Souastre
- Thièvres
- Warlincourt-lès-Pas

== Population ==
Population Evolution
1962	1968	1975	1982	1990	1999
7531	8034	7646	7330	7267	7321
Census count starting from 1962 : Population without double counting

== See also ==
- Cantons of Pas-de-Calais
- Communes of Pas-de-Calais
- Arrondissements of the Pas-de-Calais department
