= Canton of Beaumetz-lès-Loges =

Coordinates: 50°14′25″N 2°39′29″E

Beaumetz-les-Loges
- Former canton
- Interactive map of Beaumetz-les-Loges
- Country: France
- Region: Hauts-de-France
- Department: Pas-de-Calais
- No. of communes: {{{nbcomm}}}
- Disbanded: 2015
- Area: 168.97 km^{2} (65.24 sq mi)
- Population (2012): 11,999
  - Density: 71.013/km^{2} (183.92/sq mi)

The Canton of Beaumetz-lès-Loges is a former canton situated in the department of the Pas-de-Calais and in the Nord-Pas-de-Calais region of northern France. It was disbanded following the French canton reorganisation which came into effect in March 2015. It had a total of 11,999 inhabitants (2012, without double counting).

== Geography ==
The canton was organized around Beaumetz-les-Loges in the arrondissement of Arras. The altitude varies from 67m (Agnez-lès-Duisans) to 178m (La Herlière) for an average altitude of 109m.

The canton comprised 29 communes:

- Adinfer
- Agnez-lès-Duisans
- Bailleulmont
- Bailleulval
- Basseux
- Beaumetz-lès-Loges
- Berles-au-Bois
- Berneville
- Blairville
- Boiry-Saint-Martin
- Boiry-Sainte-Rictrude
- La Cauchie
- Ficheux
- Fosseux
- Gouves
- Gouy-en-Artois
- Habarcq
- Haute-Avesnes
- Hendecourt-lès-Ransart
- La Herlière
- Mercatel
- Monchiet
- Monchy-au-Bois
- Montenescourt
- Ransart
- Rivière
- Simencourt
- Wanquetin
- Warlus

== Population ==
Population Evolution
1962	1968	1975	1982	1990	1999
8810	9284	9725	10818	11743	11670
Census count starting from 1962 : Population without double counting

== See also ==
- Cantons of Pas-de-Calais
- Communes of Pas-de-Calais
- Arrondissements of the Pas-de-Calais department
