= Canton of Aubigny-en-Artois =

Coordinates: 50°21′39″N 2°31′32″E

Aubigny-en-Artois
- Former canton
- Interactive map of Aubigny-en-Artois
- Country: France
- Region: Hauts-de-France
- Department: Pas-de-Calais
- No. of communes: {{{nbcomm}}}
- Disbanded: 2015
- Area: 173.00 km^{2} (66.80 sq mi)
- Population (2012): 12,650
  - Density: 73.12/km^{2} (189.4/sq mi)

The Canton of Aubigny-en-Artois is a former canton situated in the department of the Pas-de-Calais and in the Nord-Pas-de-Calais region of northern France. It was disbanded following the French canton reorganisation which came into effect in March 2015. It had a total of 12,650 inhabitants (2012, without double counting).

== Geography ==
The canton was organised around Aubigny-en-Artois in the arrondissement of Arras. The altitude varied from 70m (La Comté) to 193m (La Comté) for an average altitude of 127m.

The canton comprised 30 communes:

- Agnières
- Ambrines
- Aubigny-en-Artois
- Averdoingt
- Bailleul-aux-Cornailles
- Bajus
- Berles-Monchel
- Béthonsart
- Cambligneul
- Camblain-l'Abbé
- Capelle-Fermont
- Chelers
- La Comté
- Frévillers
- Frévin-Capelle
- Gouy-en-Ternois
- Hermaville
- Izel-lès-Hameau
- Magnicourt-en-Comte
- Maizières
- Mingoval
- Monchy-Breton
- Penin
- Savy-Berlette
- La Thieuloye
- Tilloy-lès-Hermaville
- Tincques
- Villers-Brûlin
- Villers-Châtel
- Villers-Sir-Simon

== Population ==
Population Evolution
1962	1968	1975	1982	1990	1999	2012
9501	10056	9871	10572	11526	11541	12650
Census count starting from 1962 : Population without double counting

== See also ==
- Cantons of Pas-de-Calais
- Communes of Pas-de-Calais
- Arrondissements of the Pas-de-Calais department
