= Arrondissement of Arras =

Coordinates: 50.28°N 2.78°E

Arras
- Arrondissement
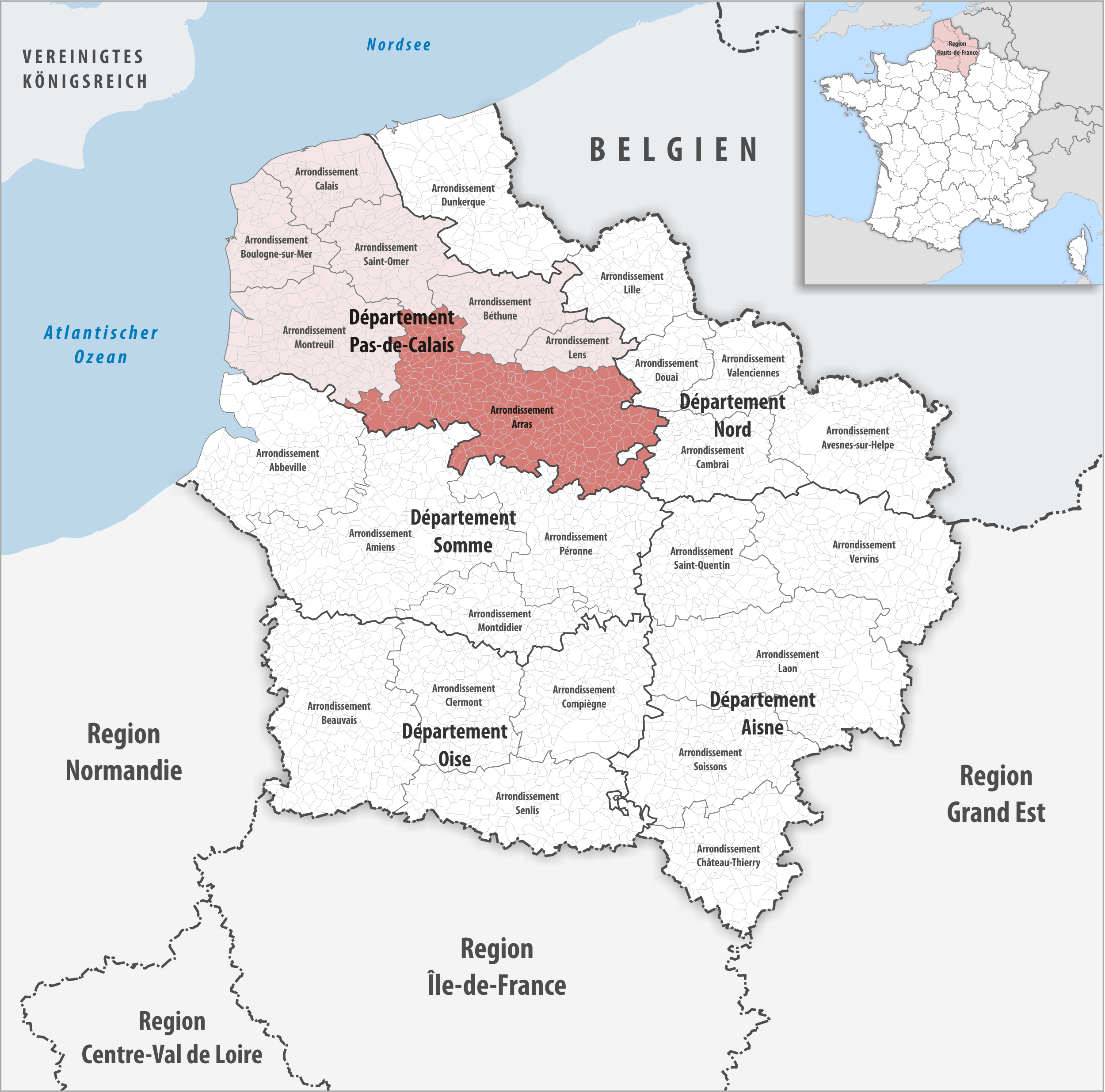
- Location within the region Hauts-de-France
- Country: France
- Region: Hauts-de-France
- Department: Pas-de-Calais
- No. of communes: {{{nbcomm}}}
- Area: 2,245.3 km^{2} (866.9 sq mi)
- Population (2023): 250,064
  - Density: 111.37/km^{2} (288.45/sq mi)
- INSEE code: 621

The arrondissement of Arras is an arrondissement of France in the Pas-de-Calais department in the Hauts-de-France region. It has 357 communes. Its population is 249,961 (2021), and its area is 2,245.3 km^{2} (866.9 sq mi).

== Composition ==
The communes of the arrondissement of Arras, and their INSEE codes, are:

1. Ablainzevelle (62002)
2. Achicourt (62004)
3. Achiet-le-Grand (62005)
4. Achiet-le-Petit (62006)
5. Acq (62007)
6. Adinfer (62009)
7. Agnez-lès-Duisans (62011)
8. Agnières (62012)
9. Agny (62013)
10. Ambrines (62027)
11. Amplier (62030)
12. Anvin (62036)
13. Anzin-Saint-Aubin (62037)
14. Arleux-en-Gohelle (62039)
15. Arras (62041)
16. Athies (62042)
17. Aubigny-en-Artois (62045)
18. Aubrometz (62047)
19. Aumerval (62058)
20. Auxi-le-Château (62060)
21. Averdoingt (62061)
22. Avesnes-le-Comte (62063)
23. Avesnes-lès-Bapaume (62064)
24. Ayette (62068)
25. Bailleul-aux-Cornailles (62070)
26. Bailleul-lès-Pernes (62071)
27. Bailleulmont (62072)
28. Bailleul-Sir-Berthoult (62073)
29. Bailleulval (62074)
30. Bancourt (62079)
31. Bapaume (62080)
32. Baralle (62081)
33. Barastre (62082)
34. Barly (62084)
35. Basseux (62085)
36. Bavincourt (62086)
37. Beaudricourt (62091)
38. Beaufort-Blavincourt (62092)
39. Beaulencourt (62093)
40. Beaumetz-lès-Cambrai (62096)
41. Beaumetz-lès-Loges (62097)
42. Beaurains (62099)
43. Beauvoir-Wavans (62881)
44. Beauvois (62101)
45. Béhagnies (62103)
46. Bellonne (62106)
47. Bergueneuse (62109)
48. Berlencourt-le-Cauroy (62111)
49. Berles-au-Bois (62112)
50. Berles-Monchel (62113)
51. Bermicourt (62114)
52. Berneville (62115)
53. Bertincourt (62117)
54. Béthonsart (62118)
55. Beugnâtre (62121)
56. Beugny (62122)
57. Biache-Saint-Vaast (62128)
58. Biefvillers-lès-Bapaume (62129)
59. Bienvillers-au-Bois (62130)
60. Bihucourt (62131)
61. Blairville (62135)
62. Blangerval-Blangermont (62137)
63. Boffles (62143)
64. Boiry-Becquerelle (62144)
65. Boiry-Notre-Dame (62145)
66. Boiry-Sainte-Rictrude (62147)
67. Boiry-Saint-Martin (62146)
68. Boisleux-au-Mont (62151)
69. Boisleux-Saint-Marc (62152)
70. Bonnières (62154)
71. Boubers-sur-Canche (62158)
72. Bouret-sur-Canche (62163)
73. Bourlon (62164)
74. Bours (62166)
75. Boyaval (62171)
76. Boyelles (62172)
77. Brebières (62173)
78. Brias (62180)
79. Bucquoy (62181)
80. Buire-au-Bois (62182)
81. Buissy (62184)
82. Bullecourt (62185)
83. Buneville (62187)
84. Bus (62189)
85. Cagnicourt (62192)
86. Camblain-l'Abbé (62199)
87. Cambligneul (62198)
88. Canettemont (62208)
89. Capelle-Fermont (62211)
90. La Cauchie (62216)
91. Chelers (62221)
92. Chérisy (62223)
93. Conchy-sur-Canche (62234)
94. Conteville-en-Ternois (62238)
95. Corbehem (62240)
96. Couin (62242)
97. Coullemont (62243)
98. Courcelles-le-Comte (62248)
99. Couturelle (62253)
100. Croisette (62258)
101. Croisilles (62259)
102. Croix-en-Ternois (62260)
103. Dainville (62263)
104. Denier (62266)
105. Douchy-lès-Ayette (62272)
106. Duisans (62279)
107. Dury (62280)
108. Écoivres (62283)
109. Écourt-Saint-Quentin (62284)
110. Écoust-Saint-Mein (62285)
111. Écurie (62290)
112. Épinoy (62298)
113. Eps (62299)
114. Équirre (62301)
115. Érin (62303)
116. Ervillers (62306)
117. Estrée-Wamin (62316)
118. Étaing (62317)
119. Éterpigny (62319)
120. Étrun (62320)
121. Famechon (62322)
122. Fampoux (62323)
123. Farbus (62324)
124. Favreuil (62326)
125. Feuchy (62331)
126. Ficheux (62332)
127. Fiefs (62333)
128. Flers (62337)
129. Fleury (62339)
130. Floringhem (62340)
131. Foncquevillers (62341)
132. Fontaine-lès-Boulans (62342)
133. Fontaine-lès-Croisilles (62343)
134. Fontaine-lès-Hermans (62344)
135. Fontaine-l'Étalon (62345)
136. Fortel-en-Artois (62346)
137. Fosseux (62347)
138. Foufflin-Ricametz (62348)
139. Framecourt (62352)
140. Frémicourt (62353)
141. Fresnes-lès-Montauban (62355)
142. Fresnoy-en-Gohelle (62358)
143. Frévent (62361)
144. Frévillers (62362)
145. Frévin-Capelle (62363)
146. Gauchin-Verloingt (62367)
147. Gaudiempré (62368)
148. Gavrelle (62369)
149. Gennes-Ivergny (62370)
150. Givenchy-le-Noble (62372)
151. Gomiécourt (62374)
152. Gommecourt (62375)
153. Gouves (62378)
154. Gouy-en-Artois (62379)
155. Gouy-en-Ternois (62381)
156. Gouy-sous-Bellonne (62383)
157. Graincourt-lès-Havrincourt (62384)
158. Grand-Rullecourt (62385)
159. Grévillers (62387)
160. Grincourt-lès-Pas (62389)
161. Guémappe (62392)
162. Guinecourt (62396)
163. Habarcq (62399)
164. Halloy (62404)
165. Hamblain-les-Prés (62405)
166. Hamelincourt (62406)
167. Hannescamps (62409)
168. Haplincourt (62410)
169. Haravesnes (62411)
170. Haucourt (62414)
171. Haute-Avesnes (62415)
172. Hautecloque (62416)
173. Hauteville (62418)
174. Havrincourt (62421)
175. Hébuterne (62422)
176. Hendecourt-lès-Cagnicourt (62424)
177. Hendecourt-lès-Ransart (62425)
178. Héninel (62426)
179. Hénin-sur-Cojeul (62428)
180. Hénu (62430)
181. Héricourt (62433)
182. La Herlière (62434)
183. Herlincourt (62435)
184. Herlin-le-Sec (62436)
185. Hermaville (62438)
186. Hermies (62440)
187. Hernicourt (62442)
188. Hestrus (62450)
189. Heuchin (62451)
190. Houvin-Houvigneul (62459)
191. Huclier (62462)
192. Humbercamps (62465)
193. Humerœuille (62467)
194. Humières (62468)
195. Inchy-en-Artois (62469)
196. Ivergny (62475)
197. Izel-lès-Équerchin (62476)
198. Izel-lès-Hameau (62477)
199. Lagnicourt-Marcel (62484)
200. Lattre-Saint-Quentin (62490)
201. Lebucquière (62493)
202. Léchelle (62494)
203. Liencourt (62507)
204. Lignereuil (62511)
205. Ligny-Saint-Flochel (62514)
206. Ligny-sur-Canche (62513)
207. Ligny-Thilloy (62515)
208. Linzeux (62518)
209. Lisbourg (62519)
210. Magnicourt-en-Comte (62536)
211. Magnicourt-sur-Canche (62537)
212. Maisnil (62539)
213. Maizières (62542)
214. Manin (62544)
215. Marest (62553)
216. Marœuil (62557)
217. Marquay (62558)
218. Marquion (62559)
219. Martinpuich (62561)
220. Mercatel (62568)
221. Metz-en-Couture (62572)
222. Mingoval (62574)
223. Moncheaux-lès-Frévent (62576)
224. Monchel-sur-Canche (62577)
225. Monchiet (62578)
226. Monchy-au-Bois (62579)
227. Monchy-Breton (62580)
228. Monchy-Cayeux (62581)
229. Monchy-le-Preux (62582)
230. Mondicourt (62583)
231. Montenescourt (62586)
232. Mont-Saint-Éloi (62589)
233. Monts-en-Ternois (62590)
234. Morchies (62591)
235. Morval (62593)
236. Mory (62594)
237. Moyenneville (62597)
238. Nédon (62600)
239. Nédonchel (62601)
240. Neuville-au-Cornet (62607)
241. Neuville-Bourjonval (62608)
242. Neuville-Saint-Vaast (62609)
243. Neuville-Vitasse (62611)
244. Neuvireuil (62612)
245. Nœux-lès-Auxi (62616)
246. Noreuil (62619)
247. Noyelles-sous-Bellonne (62627)
248. Noyellette (62629)
249. Noyelle-Vion (62630)
250. Nuncq-Hautecôte (62631)
251. Œuf-en-Ternois (62633)
252. Oisy-le-Verger (62638)
253. Oppy (62639)
254. Orville (62640)
255. Ostreville (62641)
256. Palluel (62646)
257. Pas-en-Artois (62649)
258. Pelves (62650)
259. Penin (62651)
260. Pernes (62652)
261. Pierremont (62655)
262. Plouvain (62660)
263. Pommera (62663)
264. Pommier (62664)
265. Le Ponchel (62665)
266. Prédefin (62668)
267. Pressy (62669)
268. Pronville-en-Artois (62671)
269. Puisieux (62672)
270. Quéant (62673)
271. Quiéry-la-Motte (62680)
272. Quœux-Haut-Maînil (62683)
273. Ramecourt (62686)
274. Ransart (62689)
275. Rebreuve-sur-Canche (62694)
276. Rebreuviette (62695)
277. Récourt (62697)
278. Rémy (62703)
279. Riencourt-lès-Bapaume (62708)
280. Riencourt-lès-Cagnicourt (62709)
281. Rivière (62712)
282. Roclincourt (62714)
283. Rocquigny (62715)
284. Roëllecourt (62717)
285. Rœux (62718)
286. Rougefay (62722)
287. Rumaucourt (62728)
288. Ruyaulcourt (62731)
289. Sachin (62732)
290. Sailly-au-Bois (62733)
291. Sailly-en-Ostrevent (62734)
292. Sains-lès-Marquion (62739)
293. Sains-lès-Pernes (62740)
294. Saint-Amand (62741)
295. Sainte-Catherine (62744)
296. Saint-Laurent-Blangy (62753)
297. Saint-Léger (62754)
298. Saint-Martin-sur-Cojeul (62761)
299. Saint-Michel-sur-Ternoise (62763)
300. Saint-Nicolas (62764)
301. Saint-Pol-sur-Ternoise (62767)
302. Sapignies (62776)
303. Le Sars (62777)
304. Sars-le-Bois (62778)
305. Sarton (62779)
306. Sauchy-Cauchy (62780)
307. Sauchy-Lestrée (62781)
308. Saudemont (62782)
309. Saulty (62784)
310. Savy-Berlette (62785)
311. Séricourt (62791)
312. Sibiville (62795)
313. Simencourt (62796)
314. Siracourt (62797)
315. Sombrin (62798)
316. Souastre (62800)
317. Le Souich (62802)
318. Sus-Saint-Léger (62804)
319. Tangry (62805)
320. Teneur (62808)
321. Ternas (62809)
322. Thélus (62810)
323. La Thieuloye (62813)
324. Thièvres (62814)
325. Tilloy-lès-Hermaville (62816)
326. Tilloy-lès-Mofflaines (62817)
327. Tilly-Capelle (62818)
328. Tincques (62820)
329. Tollent (62822)
330. Tortequesne (62825)
331. Le Transloy (62829)
332. Trescault (62830)
333. Troisvaux (62831)
334. Vacquerie-le-Boucq (62833)
335. Valhuon (62835)
336. Vaulx (62838)
337. Vaulx-Vraucourt (62839)
338. Vélu (62840)
339. Villers-au-Flos (62855)
340. Villers-Brûlin (62856)
341. Villers-Châtel (62857)
342. Villers-lès-Cagnicourt (62858)
343. Villers-l'Hôpital (62859)
344. Villers-Sir-Simon (62860)
345. Vis-en-Artois (62864)
346. Vitry-en-Artois (62865)
347. Wailly (62869)
348. Wancourt (62873)
349. Wanquetin (62874)
350. Warlencourt-Eaucourt (62876)
351. Warlincourt-lès-Pas (62877)
352. Warlus (62878)
353. Warluzel (62879)
354. Wavrans-sur-Ternoise (62883)
355. Willencourt (62891)
356. Willerval (62892)
357. Ytres (62909)

== History ==
The arrondissement of Arras was created in 1800. In January 2007 it lost the canton of Le Parcq to the arrondissement of Montreuil, and the two cantons of Avion and Rouvroy to the arrondissement of Lens. At the January 2017 reorganisation of the arrondissements of Pas-de-Calais, it lost three communes to the arrondissement of Béthune and eight communes to the arrondissement of Lens.

As a result of the reorganisation of the cantons of France which came into effect in 2015, the borders of the cantons are no longer related to the borders of the arrondissements. The cantons of the arrondissement of Arras were, as of January 2015:

1. Arras-Nord
2. Arras-Ouest
3. Arras-Sud
4. Aubigny-en-Artois
5. Auxi-le-Château
6. Avesnes-le-Comte
7. Bapaume
8. Beaumetz-lès-Loges
9. Bertincourt
10. Croisilles
11. Dainville
12. Heuchin
13. Marquion
14. Pas-en-Artois
15. Saint-Pol-sur-Ternoise
16. Vimy
17. Vitry-en-Artois
