= Harry Ranken =

Recipient of the Victoria Cross

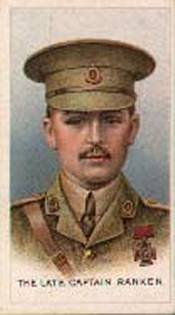
- Born: 3 September 1883; Glasgow, Scotland
- Died: 25 September 1914 (aged 31); Braine, France
- Burial place: Braine Communal Cemetery
- Military career
- Allegiance: United Kingdom
- Branch: British Army
- Service years: 1909 - 1914
- Rank: Captain
- Units: Royal Army Medical Corps
- Conflicts: World War I
- Awards: Victoria Cross

Harry Sherwood Ranken VC (3 September 1883 – 25 September 1914) was a Scottish recipient of the Victoria Cross, the highest and most prestigious award for gallantry in the face of the enemy that can be awarded to British and Commonwealth forces.

== Details ==
Harry Ranken graduated from the University of Glasgow in 1905, and joined the British Army in 1909. Ranken was 31 years old, and a captain in the Royal Army Medical Corps, British Army, attached to 1st Battalion, The King's Royal Rifle Corps during the First World War when the following deed took place for which he was awarded the VC.

On 19 and 20 September 1914 at Haute-Avesnes, France, Captain Ranken was severely wounded in the leg whilst attending to his duties on the battlefield under shrapnel and rifle fire. He arrested the bleeding from this and bound it up, then continued to dress the wounds of his men, sacrificing his own chance of survival to their needs. When he finally permitted himself to be carried to the rear his case had become almost desperate and he died on 25 September.

Ranken is buried in Braine Communal Cemetery.

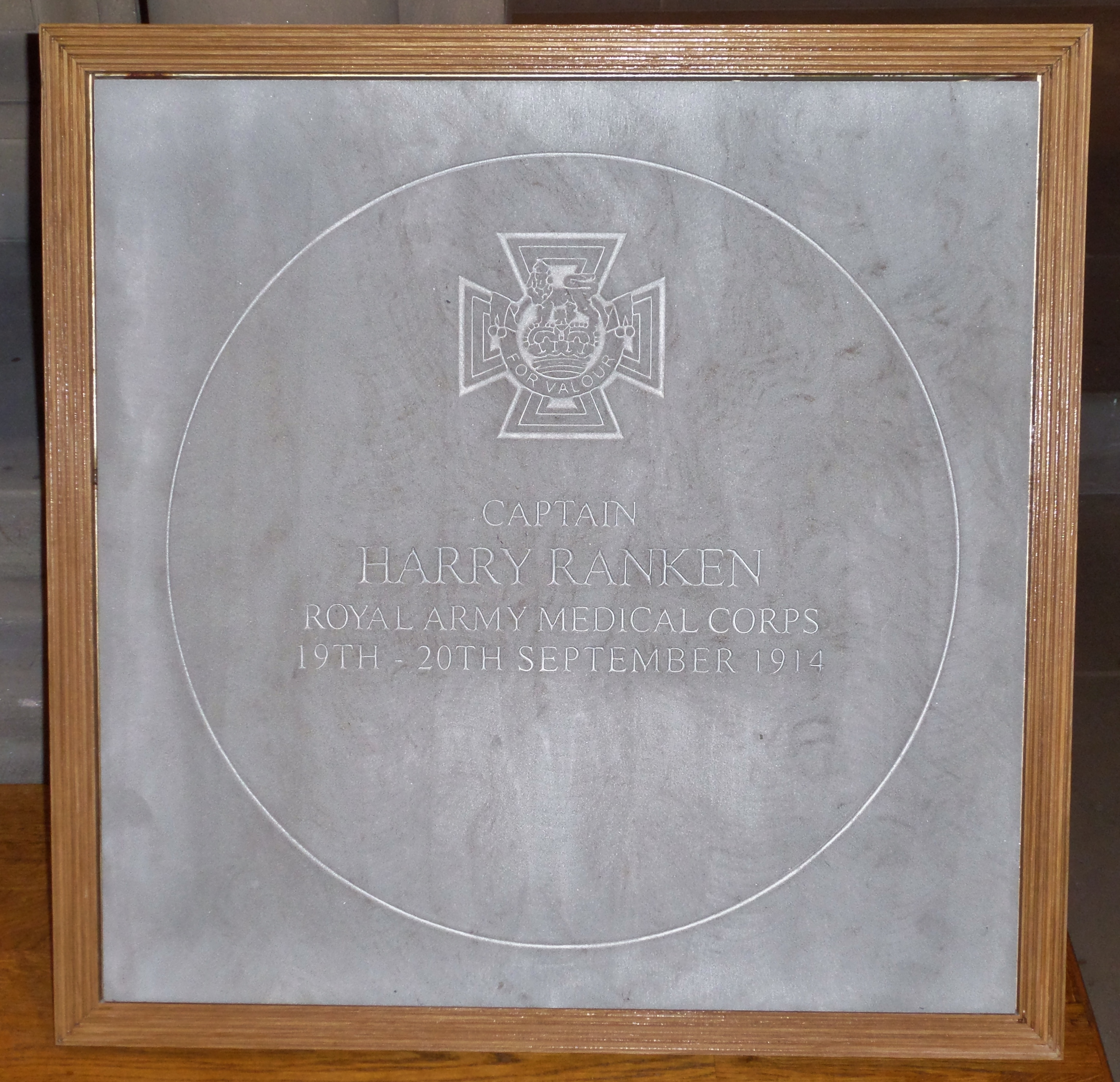
Memorial plaque to Harry Ranken VC in Glasgow University Chapel.

== Legacy ==
Ranken worked at the Brook fever hospital in South East London, which was on the site adjacent to the Royal Herbert Military Hospital; the original hospital designed on the principles laid down by Florence Nightingale after the Crimean war. When the military hospital moved across the road to a new set of buildings around 1977 - the Queen Elizabeth Military Hospital - the administration block at the QE was named after him - Ranken House. The QE has since been largely rebuilt and is now a civilian hospital, but the name has been preserved. Harry Ranken's photograph and a copy of his citation are still proudly displayed in the reception area of Ranken House.

== The medal ==
His Victoria Cross is displayed at the Army Medical Services Museum (Aldershot, England).
