= Hendecourt =

Hendecourt may refer to two communes in the Pas-de-Calais department in northern France:

- Hendecourt-lès-Cagnicourt
- Hendecourt-lès-Ransart
