= Canton of Arras-Nord =

Coordinates: 50°18′00″N 2°48′11″E

Arras-Nord
- Former canton
- Interactive map of Arras-Nord
- Country: France
- Region: Hauts-de-France
- Department: Pas-de-Calais
- No. of communes: {{{nbcomm}}}
- Disbanded: 2015
- Population (2012): 20,334

The Canton of Arras-Nord is a former canton situated in the department of the Pas-de-Calais and the Nord-Pas-de-Calais region of northern France. It was disbanded following the French canton reorganisation which came into effect in March 2015. It consisted of 4 communes, which joined the canton of Arras-2 in 2015. It had a total of 20,334 inhabitants (2012, without double counting).

== Composition ==
The canton comprised 4 communes:

- Arras (partly)
- Athies
- Saint-Laurent-Blangy
- Saint-Nicolas

== See also ==
- Cantons of Pas-de-Calais
- Communes of Pas-de-Calais
- Arrondissements of the Pas-de-Calais department
