= Roëllecourt =

- Commune
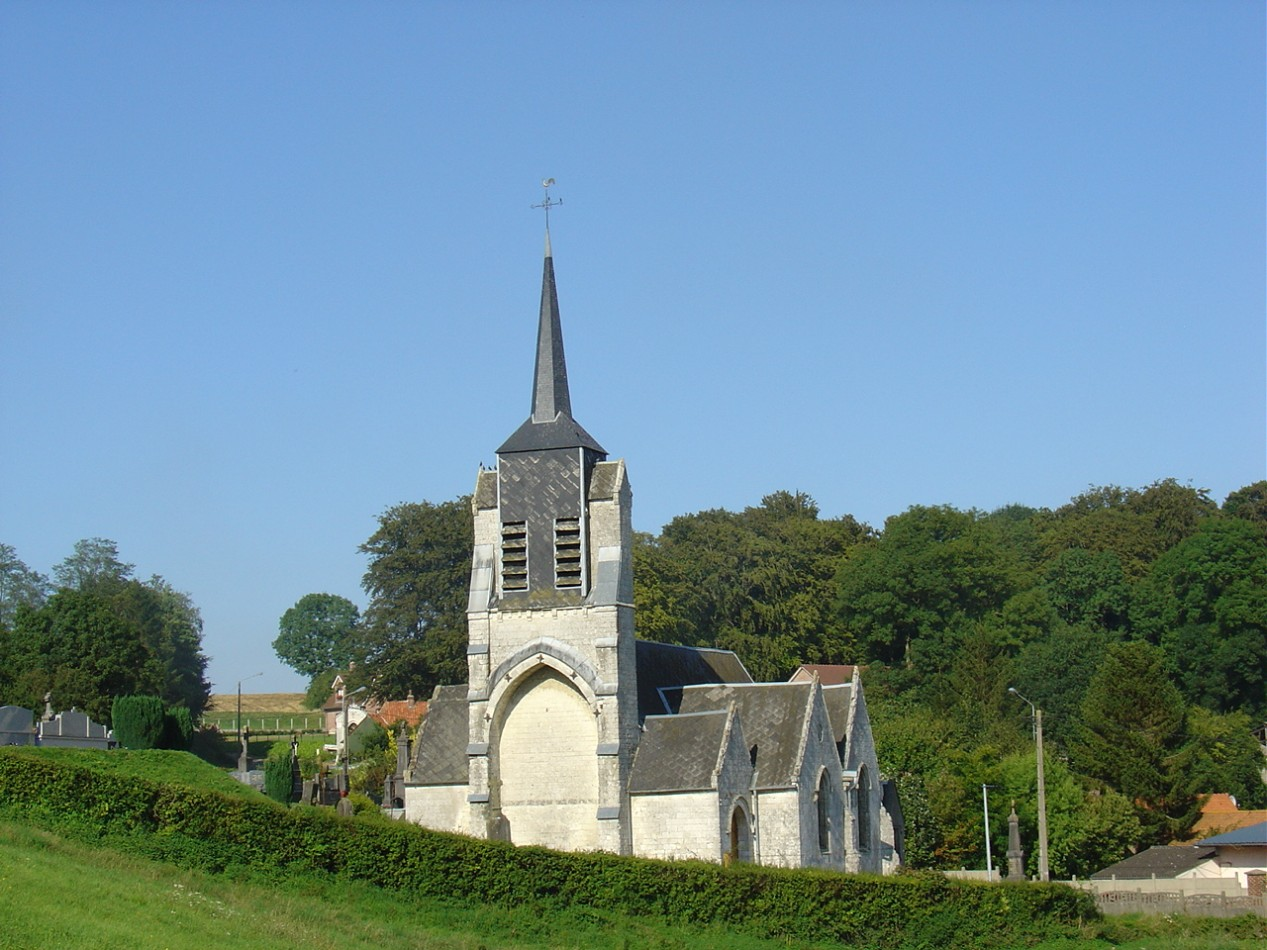
- The church of Roëllecourt

- Coat of arms
- Location of Roëllecourt
- Location within France Location within Hauts-de-France
- Coordinates: 50°22′06″N 2°23′13″E
- Country: France
- Region: Hauts-de-France
- Department: Pas-de-Calais
- Arrondissement: Arras
- Canton: Saint-Pol-sur-Ternoise
- Intercommunality: CC Ternois

Government
  - Mayor (2020–2026): Alain Berthe
- Area^{1}: 9.42 km^{2} (3.64 sq mi)
- Elevation: 115 m (377 ft)
- Highest elevation: 150 m (490 ft)
- Lowest elevation: 95 m (312 ft)
- Population (2023): 516
  - Density: 54.8/km^{2} (142/sq mi)
- Time zone: UTC+01:00 (CET)
  - Summer (DST): UTC+02:00 (CEST)
- INSEE/Postal code: 62717 /62130
- ^{1} French Land Register data, which excludes lakes, ponds, glaciers > 1 km^{2} (0.386 sq mi or 247 acres) and river estuaries.

Roëllecourt is a commune in the Pas-de-Calais department in the Hauts-de-France region of France.

== Geography ==
Roëllecourt lies 4 km (2.5 mi) east of Saint-Pol-sur-Ternoise, some 29 km (18 mi) west of Arras, at the junction of the D8 and N39 roads.

== Population ==
Historical population
Year	Pop.	±% p.a.
1968	354	—
1975	366	+0.48%
1982	462	+3.38%
1990	541	+1.99%
1999	595	+1.06%
2007	628	+0.68%
2012	574	−1.78%
2017	538	−1.29%
2023	516	−0.69%
Source: INSEE

== Places of interest ==
- The sixteenth-century church of St.Omer.
- An eighteenth-century manor house
- A chapel.
- Traces of an old castle.

== See also ==
- Communes of the Pas-de-Calais department
