= Canton of Arras-Sud =

Coordinates: 50°16′21″N 2°47′47″E

Arras-Sud
- Former canton
- Interactive map of Arras-Sud
- Country: France
- Region: Hauts-de-France
- Department: Pas-de-Calais
- No. of communes: {{{nbcomm}}}
- Disbanded: 2015
- Population (2012): 31,968

The Canton of Arras-Sud is a former canton situated in the department of the Pas-de-Calais and in the Nord-Pas-de-Calais region of northern France. It was disbanded following the French canton reorganisation which came into effect in March 2015. It had a total of 31,968 inhabitants (2012, without double counting).

== Composition ==
The canton comprised 9 communes:

- Achicourt
- Agny
- Arras (partly)
- Beaurains
- Fampoux
- Feuchy
- Neuville-Vitasse
- Tilloy-lès-Mofflaines
- Wailly

== See also ==
- Cantons of Pas-de-Calais
- Communes of Pas-de-Calais
- Arrondissements of the Pas-de-Calais department
