= Blairville, Pas-de-Calais =

Blairville
- Commune
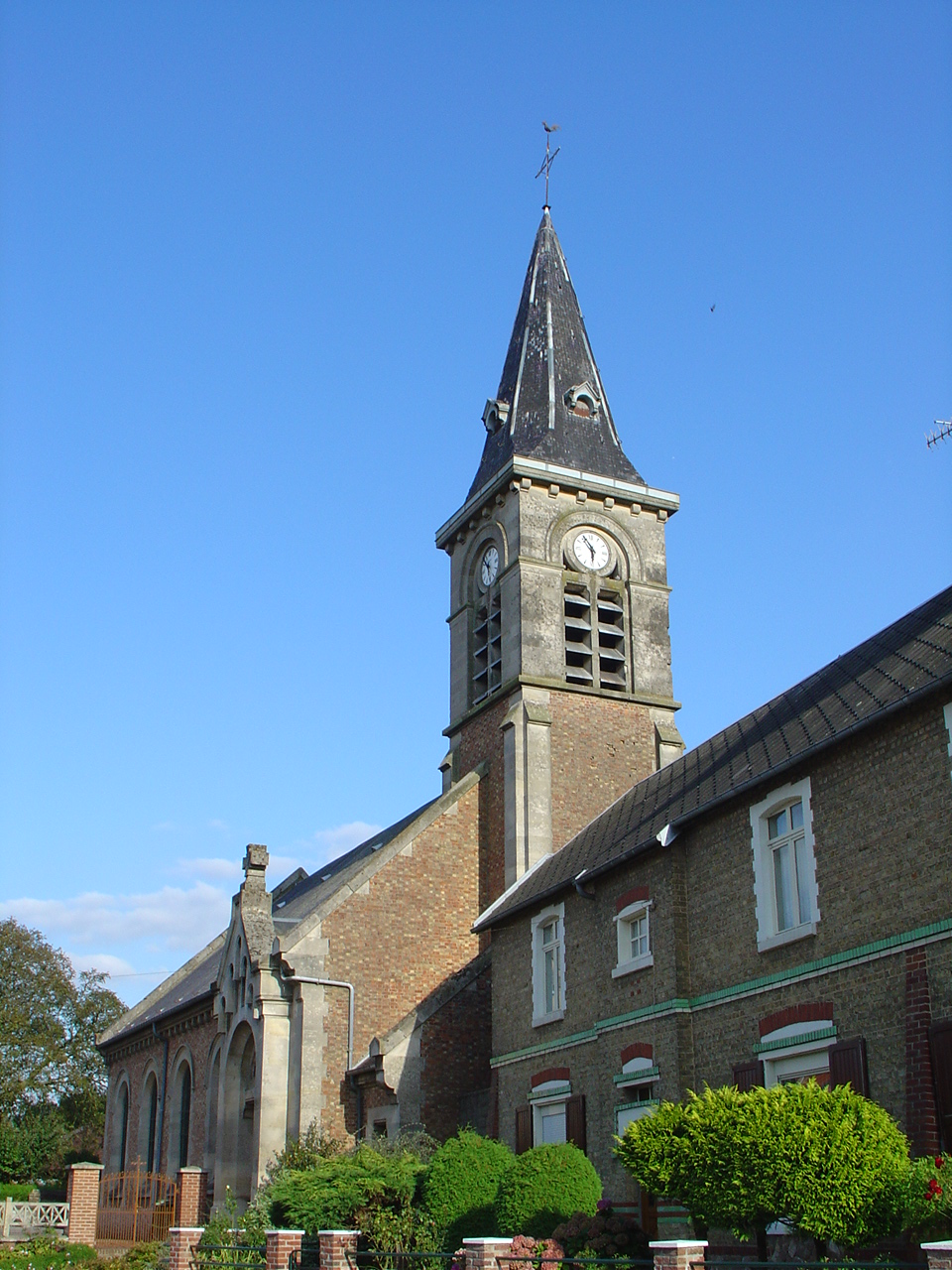
- The church of Blairville

- Coat of arms
- Location of Blairville
- Location within France Location within Hauts-de-France
- Coordinates: 50°13′14″N 2°42′53″E
- Country: France
- Region: Hauts-de-France
- Department: Pas-de-Calais
- Arrondissement: Arras
- Canton: Avesnes-le-Comte
- Intercommunality: CC Campagnes de l'Artois

Government
  - Mayor (2020–2026): Dominique Coppin
- Area^{1}: 4.6 km^{2} (1.8 sq mi)
- Elevation: 115 m (377 ft)
- Highest elevation: 130 m (430 ft)
- Lowest elevation: 91 m (299 ft)
- Population (2023): 304
  - Density: 66/km^{2} (170/sq mi)
- Time zone: UTC+01:00 (CET)
  - Summer (DST): UTC+02:00 (CEST)
- INSEE/Postal code: 62135 /62173
- ^{1} French Land Register data, which excludes lakes, ponds, glaciers > 1 km^{2} (0.386 sq mi or 247 acres) and river estuaries.

Blairville (French pronunciation: [blɛʁvil]) is a commune in the Pas-de-Calais department in the Hauts-de-France region in northern France.

== Geography ==
A farming village located 8 miles (13 km) southwest of Arras on the D34 road.

== Population ==
Historical population
| Year | Pop. | ±% p.a. |
|---|---|---|
| 1968 | 247 | — |
| 1975 | 269 | +1.23% |
| 1982 | 265 | −0.21% |
| 1990 | 271 | +0.28% |
| 1999 | 298 | +1.06% |
| 2007 | 308 | +0.41% |
| 2012 | 295 | −0.86% |
| 2017 | 314 | +1.26% |
| 2023 | 304 | −0.54% |
Source: INSEE

== Sights ==
- The church of St. Vaast, which, like most of the village, was rebuilt after the ravages of World War I.

== See also ==
- Communes of the Pas-de-Calais department
