= La Cauchie =

- Commune
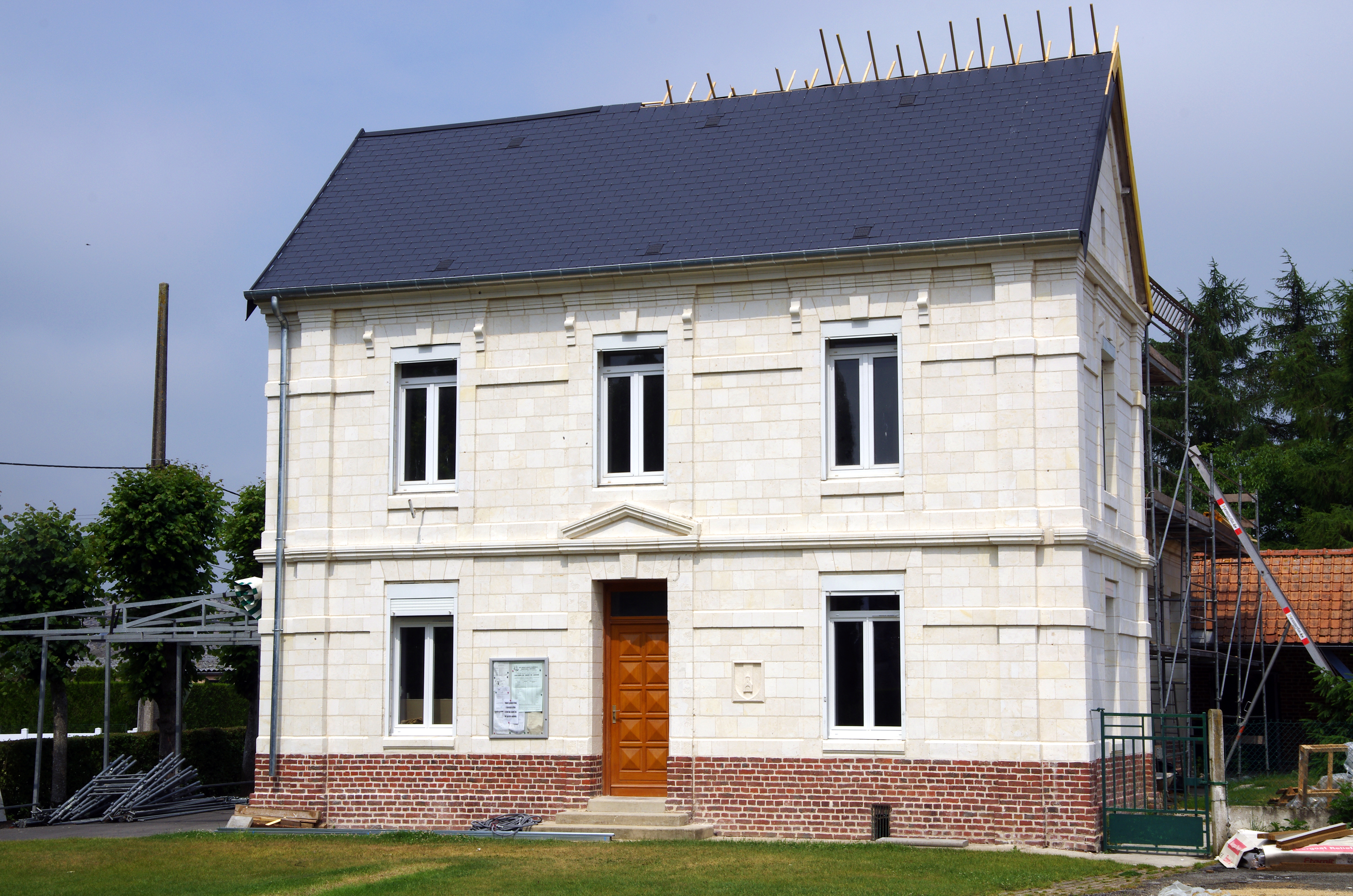
- The town hall of La Cauchie

- Coat of arms
- Location of La Cauchie
- Location within France Location within Hauts-de-France
- Coordinates: 50°12′05″N 2°34′58″E
- Country: France
- Region: Hauts-de-France
- Department: Pas-de-Calais
- Arrondissement: Arras
- Canton: Avesnes-le-Comte
- Intercommunality: CC Campagnes de l'Artois

Government
  - Mayor (2020–2026): Marie Bernard
- Area^{1}: 2.2 km^{2} (0.85 sq mi)
- Elevation: 161 m (528 ft)
- Highest elevation: 168 m (551 ft)
- Lowest elevation: 135 m (443 ft)
- Population (2023): 211
  - Density: 96/km^{2} (250/sq mi)
- Time zone: UTC+01:00 (CET)
  - Summer (DST): UTC+02:00 (CEST)
- INSEE/Postal code: 62216 /62158
- ^{1} French Land Register data, which excludes lakes, ponds, glaciers > 1 km^{2} (0.386 sq mi or 247 acres) and river estuaries.

La Cauchie (French pronunciation: [la koʃi]) is a commune in the Pas-de-Calais department in the Hauts-de-France region of France 11 miles (18 km) southwest of Arras.

== Population ==
Historical population
Year	Pop.	±% p.a.
1968	150	—
1975	166	+1.46%
1982	155	−0.97%
1990	165	+0.78%
1999	178	+0.85%
2007	213	+2.27%
2012	203	−0.96%
2017	211	+0.78%
2023	211	+0.00%
Source: INSEE

== See also ==
- Communes of the Pas-de-Calais department
