= Sailly-au-Bois =

- Commune
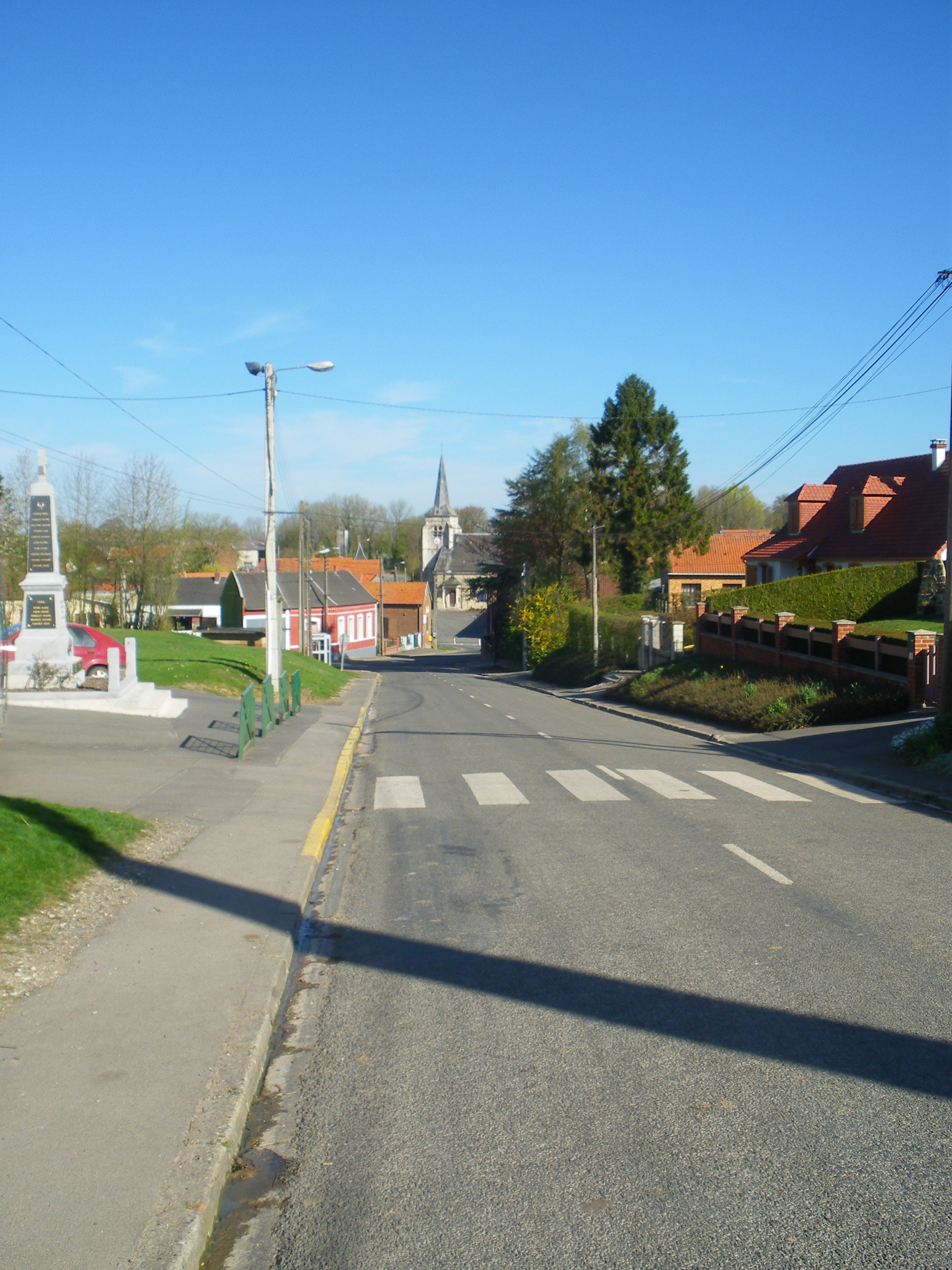
- A general view of Sailly-au-Bois

- Coat of arms
- Location of Sailly-au-Bois
- Location within France Location within Hauts-de-France
- Coordinates: 50°07′17″N 2°35′46″E
- Country: France
- Region: Hauts-de-France
- Department: Pas-de-Calais
- Arrondissement: Arras
- Canton: Avesnes-le-Comte
- Intercommunality: CC Sud-Artois

Government
  - Mayor (2020–2026): Georgette Andrieu Mikolajczak
- Area^{1}: 9.28 km^{2} (3.58 sq mi)
- Elevation: 128 m (420 ft)
- Highest elevation: 156 m (512 ft)
- Lowest elevation: 113 m (371 ft)
- Population (2023): 285
  - Density: 30.7/km^{2} (79.5/sq mi)
- Time zone: UTC+01:00 (CET)
  - Summer (DST): UTC+02:00 (CEST)
- INSEE/Postal code: 62733 /62111
- ^{1} French Land Register data, which excludes lakes, ponds, glaciers > 1 km^{2} (0.386 sq mi or 247 acres) and river estuaries.

Sailly-au-Bois (French pronunciation: [saji o bwa]; Picard: Sailly-au-Bos) is a commune in the Pas-de-Calais department in the Hauts-de-France region of France.

== Geography ==
Sailly-au-Bois lies about 18 miles (29 km) south of Arras, at the junction of the D3 and D23 roads.

== Population ==
Historical population
| Year | Pop. | ±% p.a. |
|---|---|---|
| 1968 | 334 | — |
| 1975 | 316 | −0.79% |
| 1982 | 293 | −1.07% |
| 1990 | 302 | +0.38% |
| 1999 | 265 | −1.44% |
| 2007 | 269 | +0.19% |
| 2012 | 297 | +2.00% |
| 2017 | 309 | +0.80% |
| 2023 | 285 | −1.34% |
Source: INSEE

== Places of interest ==
- The church of St.John the Baptist, dating from the eighteenth century.
- The Commonwealth War Graves Commission cemetery.

== See also ==
- Communes of the Pas-de-Calais department
