= Pommier =

- Commune
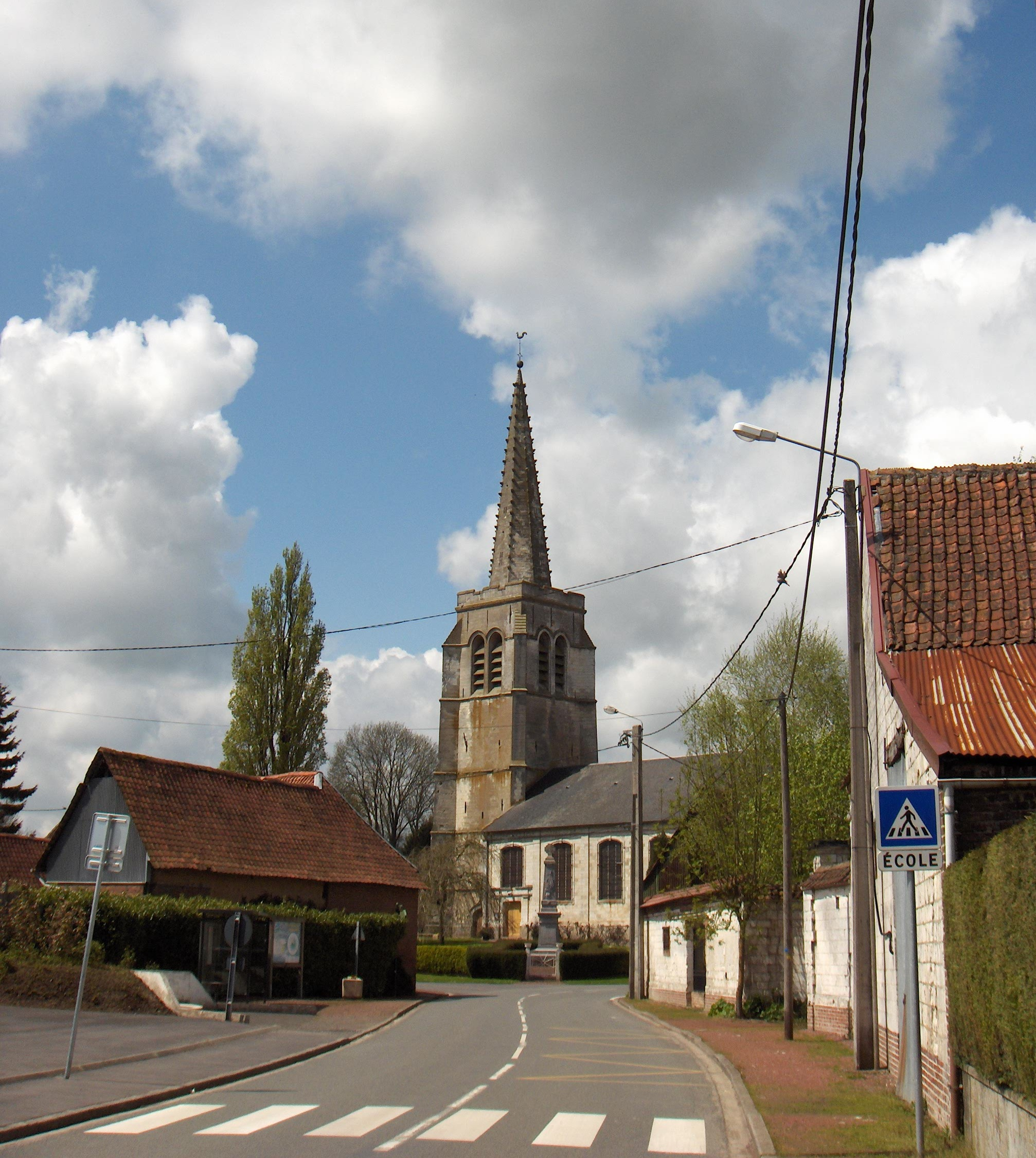
- The church of Pommier

- Coat of arms
- Location of Pommier
- Location within France Location within Hauts-de-France
- Coordinates: 50°11′05″N 2°36′00″E
- Country: France
- Region: Hauts-de-France
- Department: Pas-de-Calais
- Arrondissement: Arras
- Canton: Avesnes-le-Comte
- Intercommunality: CC Campagnes de l'Artois

Government
  - Mayor (2020–2026): Serge Leu
- Area^{1}: 5.82 km^{2} (2.25 sq mi)
- Elevation: 171 m (561 ft)
- Highest elevation: 172 m (564 ft)
- Lowest elevation: 143 m (469 ft)
- Population (2023): 244
  - Density: 41.9/km^{2} (109/sq mi)
- Time zone: UTC+01:00 (CET)
  - Summer (DST): UTC+02:00 (CEST)
- INSEE/Postal code: 62664 /62111
- ^{1} French Land Register data, which excludes lakes, ponds, glaciers > 1 km^{2} (0.386 sq mi or 247 acres) and river estuaries.

Pommier (French pronunciation: [pɔmje]; literally meaning "apple tree") is a commune in the Pas-de-Calais department in the Hauts-de-France region of France 15 miles (24 km) southwest of Arras.

== Population ==
Historical population
Year	Pop.	±% p.a.
1968	217	—
1975	194	−1.59%
1982	196	+0.15%
1990	207	+0.68%
1999	188	−1.06%
2007	232	+2.66%
2012	232	+0.00%
2017	232	+0.00%
2023	244	+0.84%
Source: INSEE

== See also ==
- Communes of the Pas-de-Calais department
