= Saint-Amand, Pas-de-Calais =

Saint-Amand
- Commune
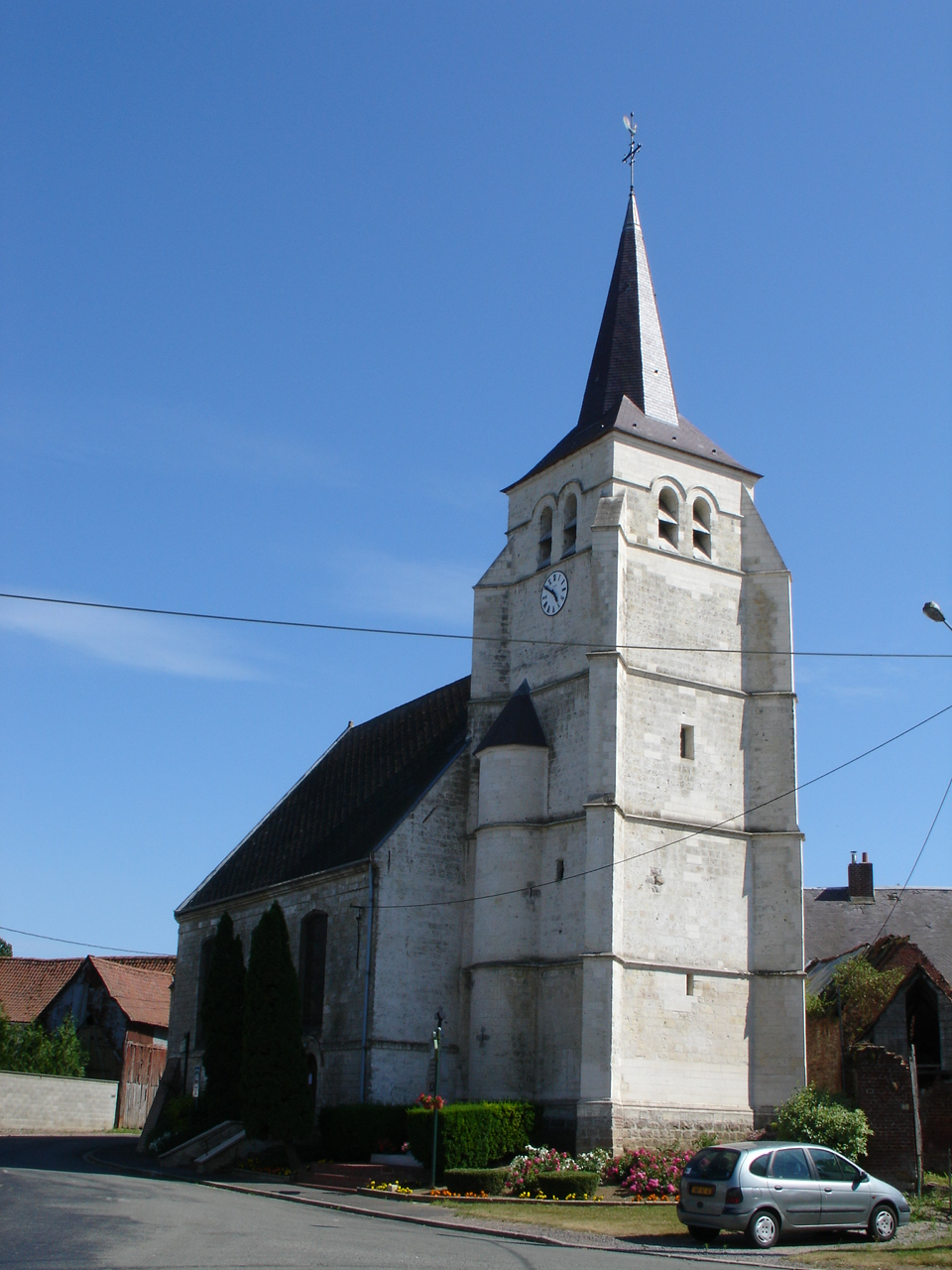
- The church of Saint-Amand

- Coat of arms
- Location of Saint-Amand
- Location within France Location within Hauts-de-France
- Coordinates: 50°09′56″N 2°33′34″E
- Country: France
- Region: Hauts-de-France
- Department: Pas-de-Calais
- Arrondissement: Arras
- Canton: Avesnes-le-Comte
- Intercommunality: CC Campagnes de l'Artois

Government
  - Mayor (2020–2026): Jean-Louis Lebas
- Area^{1}: 5.45 km^{2} (2.10 sq mi)
- Elevation: 144 m (472 ft)
- Highest elevation: 168 m (551 ft)
- Lowest elevation: 130 m (430 ft)
- Population (2023): 122
  - Density: 22.4/km^{2} (58.0/sq mi)
- Time zone: UTC+01:00 (CET)
  - Summer (DST): UTC+02:00 (CEST)
- INSEE/Postal code: 62741 /62760
- ^{1} French Land Register data, which excludes lakes, ponds, glaciers > 1 km^{2} (0.386 sq mi or 247 acres) and river estuaries.

Saint-Amand (French pronunciation: [sɛ̃.t‿amɑ̃]) is a commune in the Pas-de-Calais department in the Hauts-de-France region of France.

== Geography ==
Saint-Amand lies about 27 miles (43 km) northwest of Arras, at the junction of the D15 and D16 roads.

== Population ==
Historical population
Year	Pop.	±% p.a.
1968	192	—
1975	174	−1.40%
1982	157	−1.46%
1990	176	+1.44%
1999	164	−0.78%
2007	150	−1.11%
2012	135	−2.09%
2017	122	−2.00%
2023	122	+0.00%
Source: INSEE

== Places of interest ==
- The church of St. Amand, dating from the sixteenth century.
- The fifteenth century cemetery chapel.
- The Commonwealth War Graves Commission cemetery.

== See also ==
Communes of the Pas-de-Calais department
