= Savy-Berlette =

- Commune
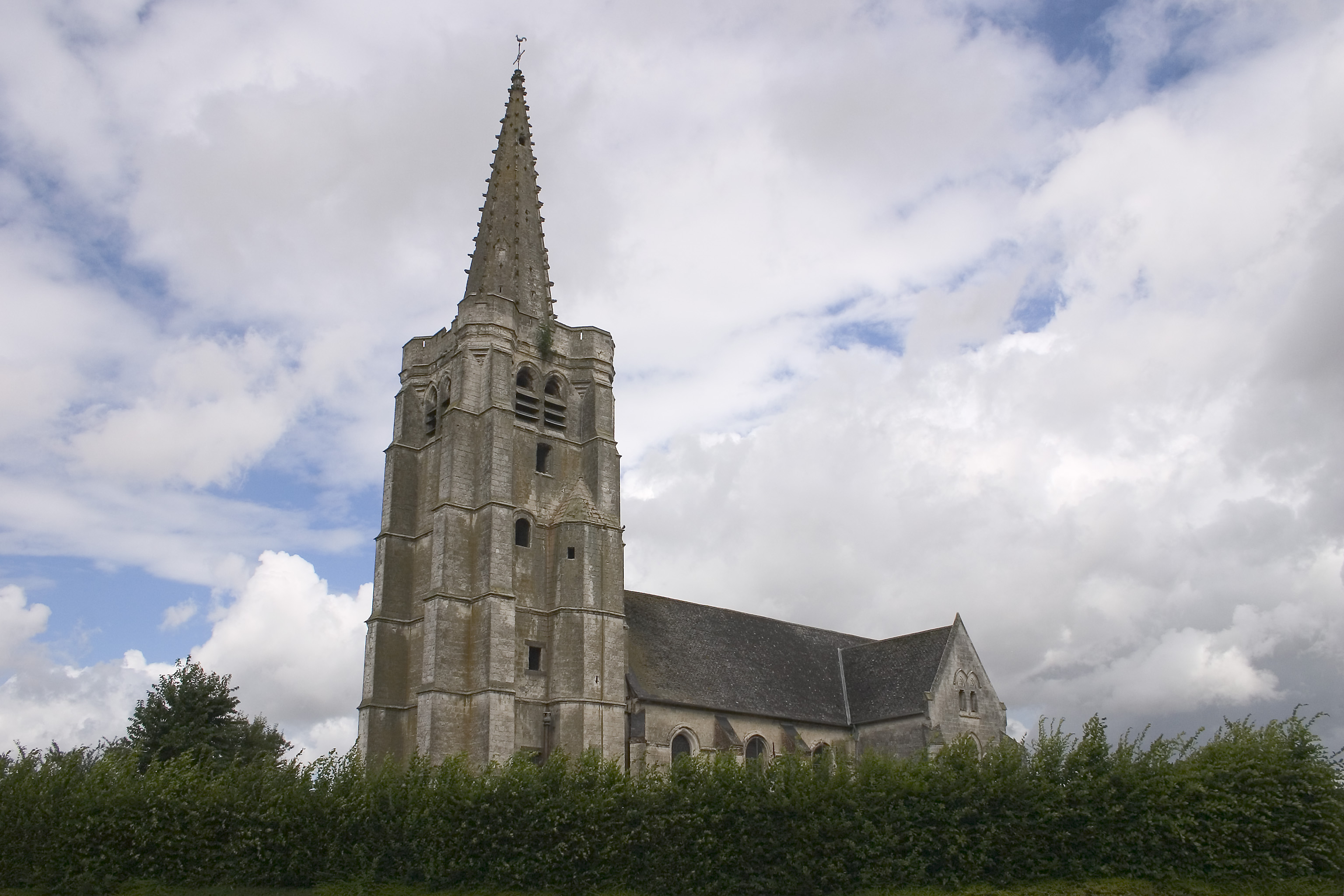
- The church of Savy-Berlette

- Coat of arms
- Location of Savy-Berlette
- Location within France Location within Hauts-de-France
- Coordinates: 50°21′12″N 2°33′56″E
- Country: France
- Region: Hauts-de-France
- Department: Pas-de-Calais
- Arrondissement: Arras
- Canton: Avesnes-le-Comte
- Intercommunality: CC Campagnes de l'Artois

Government
  - Mayor (2020–2026): Jean-François Varoqui
- Area^{1}: 7.49 km^{2} (2.89 sq mi)
- Elevation: 98 m (322 ft)
- Highest elevation: 138 m (453 ft)
- Lowest elevation: 92 m (302 ft)
- Population (2023): 929
  - Density: 124/km^{2} (321/sq mi)
- Time zone: UTC+01:00 (CET)
  - Summer (DST): UTC+02:00 (CEST)
- INSEE/Postal code: 62785 /62690
- ^{1} French Land Register data, which excludes lakes, ponds, glaciers > 1 km^{2} (0.386 sq mi or 247 acres) and river estuaries.

Savy-Berlette is a commune in the Pas-de-Calais department in the Hauts-de-France region of France 12 miles (19 km) northwest of Arras.

== Population ==
Historical population
Year	Pop.	±% p.a.
1968	674	—
1975	616	−1.28%
1982	702	+1.88%
1990	800	+1.65%
1999	854	+0.73%
2007	956	+1.42%
2012	939	−0.36%
2017	916	−0.49%
2023	929	+0.24%
Source: INSEE

== See also ==
- Communes of the Pas-de-Calais department
