= Agny =

- Commune
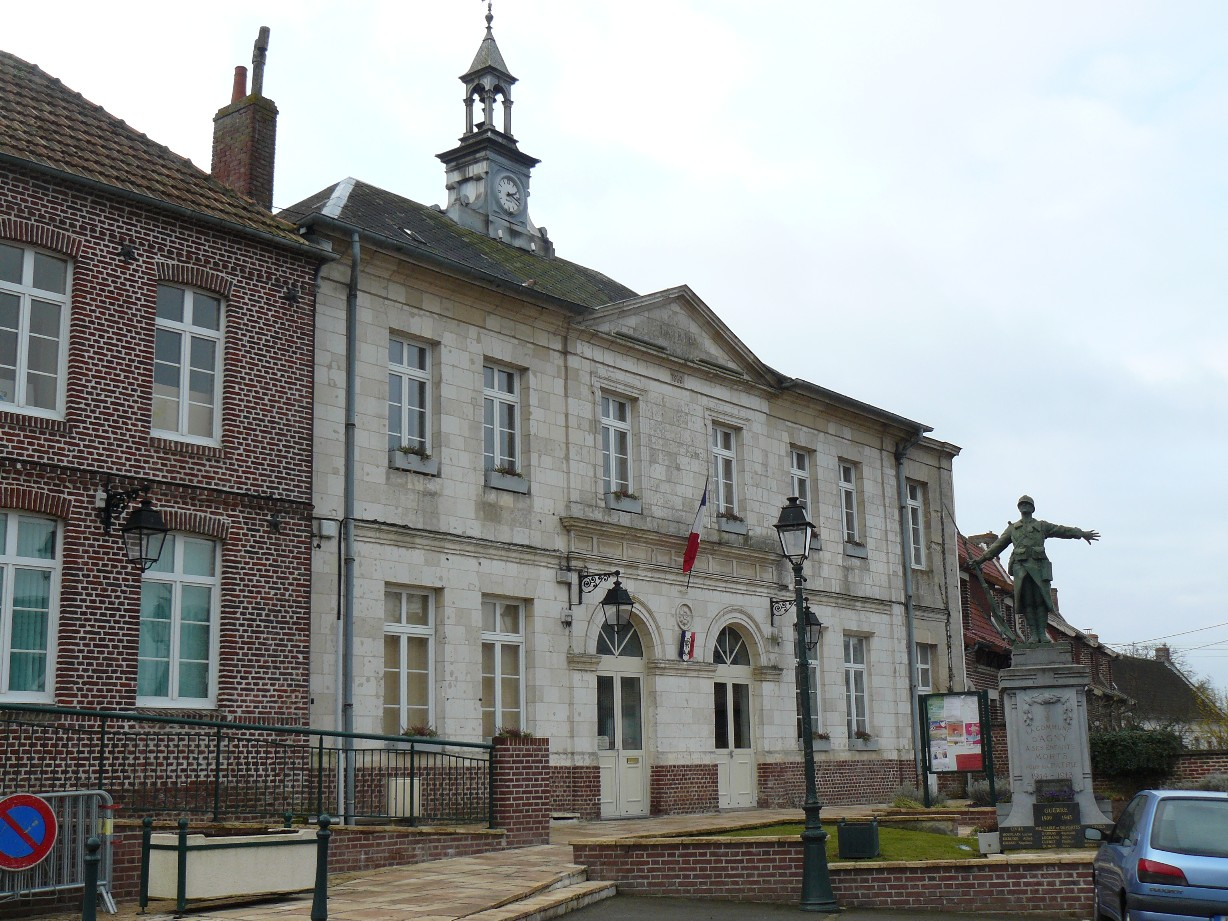
- The town hall of Agny

- Coat of arms
- Location of Agny
- Location within France Location within Hauts-de-France
- Coordinates: 50°15′39″N 2°45′37″E
- Country: France
- Region: Hauts-de-France
- Department: Pas-de-Calais
- Arrondissement: Arras
- Canton: Arras-3
- Intercommunality: Arras

Government
  - Mayor (2020–2026): Pascal Dutoit
- Area^{1}: 6.05 km^{2} (2.34 sq mi)
- Elevation: 81 m (266 ft)
- Highest elevation: 98 m (322 ft)
- Lowest elevation: 65 m (213 ft)
- Population (2023): 1,871
  - Density: 309/km^{2} (801/sq mi)
- Time zone: UTC+01:00 (CET)
  - Summer (DST): UTC+02:00 (CEST)
- INSEE/Postal code: 62013 /62217
- ^{1} French Land Register data, which excludes lakes, ponds, glaciers > 1 km^{2} (0.386 sq mi or 247 acres) and river estuaries.

Agny (French pronunciation: [aɲi]) is a commune in the Pas-de-Calais department in northern France.

== Geography ==
A farming village located 3 miles (5 km) southwest of Arras, at the D3 and D60 road junction.

== History ==
World War I 1914–1918. War broke out in August 1914 and in September troops were massed on the territory. Agny quickly found itself on the front line. As it was also on a railway line, it was easy to approach the theatre of operations.
In October 1914, violent fighting allowed the German army to advance. A bloody battle took place on 25 September 1915. The French 135th Infantry Regiment lost 38 officers and 1162 men killed, wounded or missing. Despite the fierce fighting during the conflict, the town hall, built in 1860, was not destroyed.
The Second World War. When this conflict broke out, the invading Germans soon occupied the commune. Networks of resistance were quickly set in place. The mayor, Philibert Cleret carried out some particularly dangerous actions but was eventually captured. He was arrested, interned, and then deported. He died at Buchenwald on 10 March 1945.

== Population ==
Historical population
Year	Pop.	±% p.a.
1968	1,083	—
1975	1,291	+2.54%
1982	1,232	−0.67%
1990	1,963	+6.00%
1999	1,954	−0.05%
2007	1,888	−0.43%
2012	1,939	+0.53%
2017	1,929	−0.10%
2023	1,871	−0.51%
Source: INSEE

== Sights ==
- The church of St.Laurent, rebuilt in the 20th century.

== See also ==
- Communes of the Pas-de-Calais department

== International relations ==
Agny is twinned with Betley, United Kingdom.
