= Adinfer =

- Commune
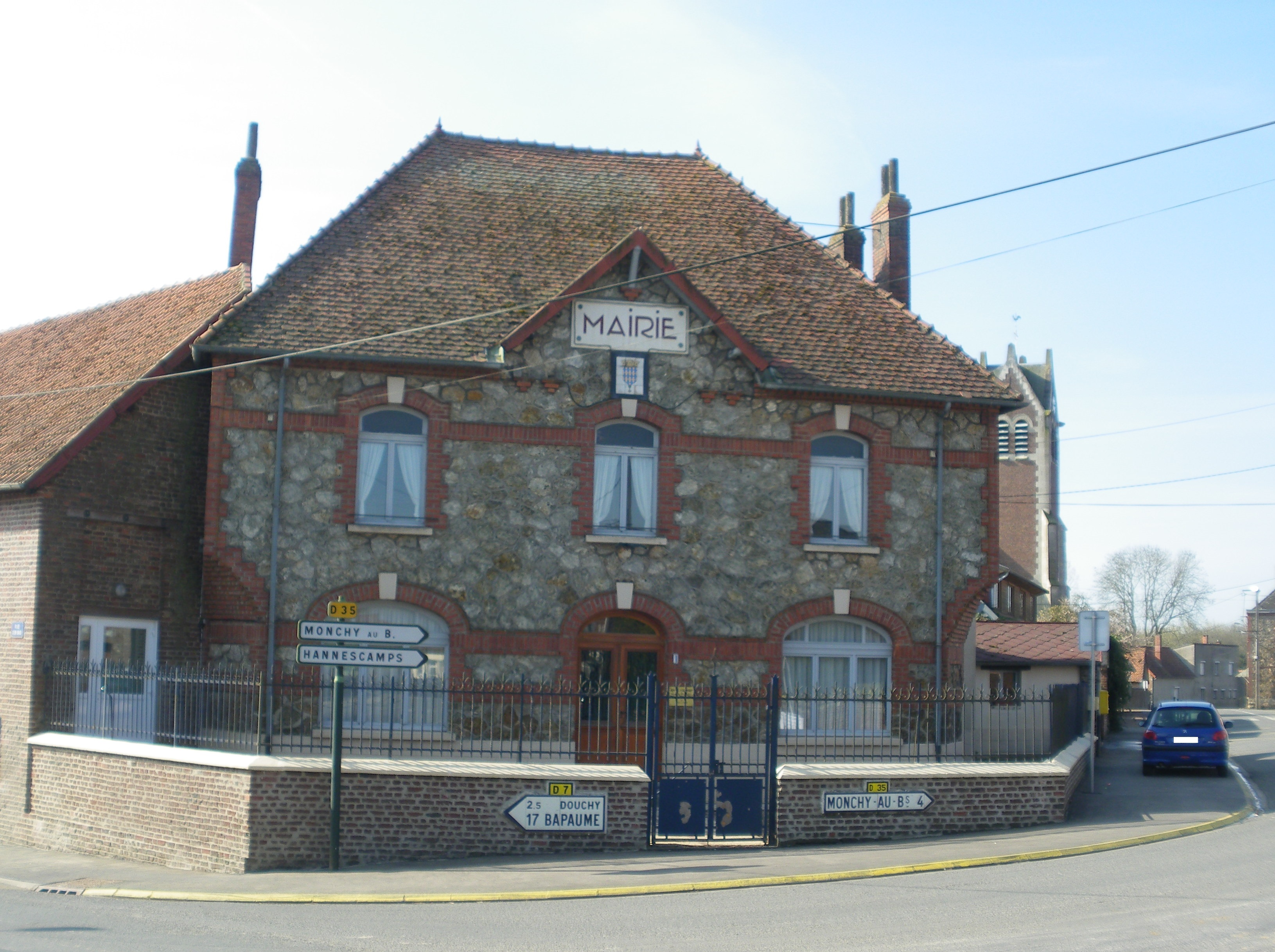
- The town hall of Adinfer

- Coat of arms
- Location of Adinfer
- Location within France Location within Hauts-de-France
- Coordinates: 50°11′41″N 2°42′32″E
- Country: France
- Region: Hauts-de-France
- Department: Pas-de-Calais
- Arrondissement: Arras
- Canton: Avesnes-le-Comte
- Intercommunality: Campagnes de l'Artois

Government
  - Mayor (2020–2026): Jean-Marie Dufay
- Area^{1}: 6.19 km^{2} (2.39 sq mi)
- Elevation: 130 m (430 ft)
- Highest elevation: 149 m (489 ft)
- Lowest elevation: 100 m (330 ft)
- Population (2023): 287
  - Density: 46.4/km^{2} (120/sq mi)
- Time zone: UTC+01:00 (CET)
  - Summer (DST): UTC+02:00 (CEST)
- INSEE/Postal code: 62009 /62116
- ^{1} French Land Register data, which excludes lakes, ponds, glaciers > 1 km^{2} (0.386 sq mi or 247 acres) and river estuaries.

Adinfer (French pronunciation: [adɛ̃fɛʁ]; Picard: Andinfer) is a commune in the Pas-de-Calais department in northern France.

== Geography ==
A farming village located 6 miles (9 km) south of Arras, at the D4, D7 and D35 road junction.

== Population ==
Historical population
Year	Pop.	±% p.a.
1968	211	—
1975	194	−1.19%
1982	192	−0.15%
1990	200	+0.51%
1999	212	+0.65%
2007	216	+0.23%
2012	237	+1.87%
2017	259	+1.79%
2023	287	+1.73%
Source: INSEE

== Sights ==
- The church of St.Nicholas, dating from the twentieth century, built after the village was destroyed in World War I.

== See also ==
- Communes of the Pas-de-Calais department
