= Athies, Pas-de-Calais =

Athies
- Commune
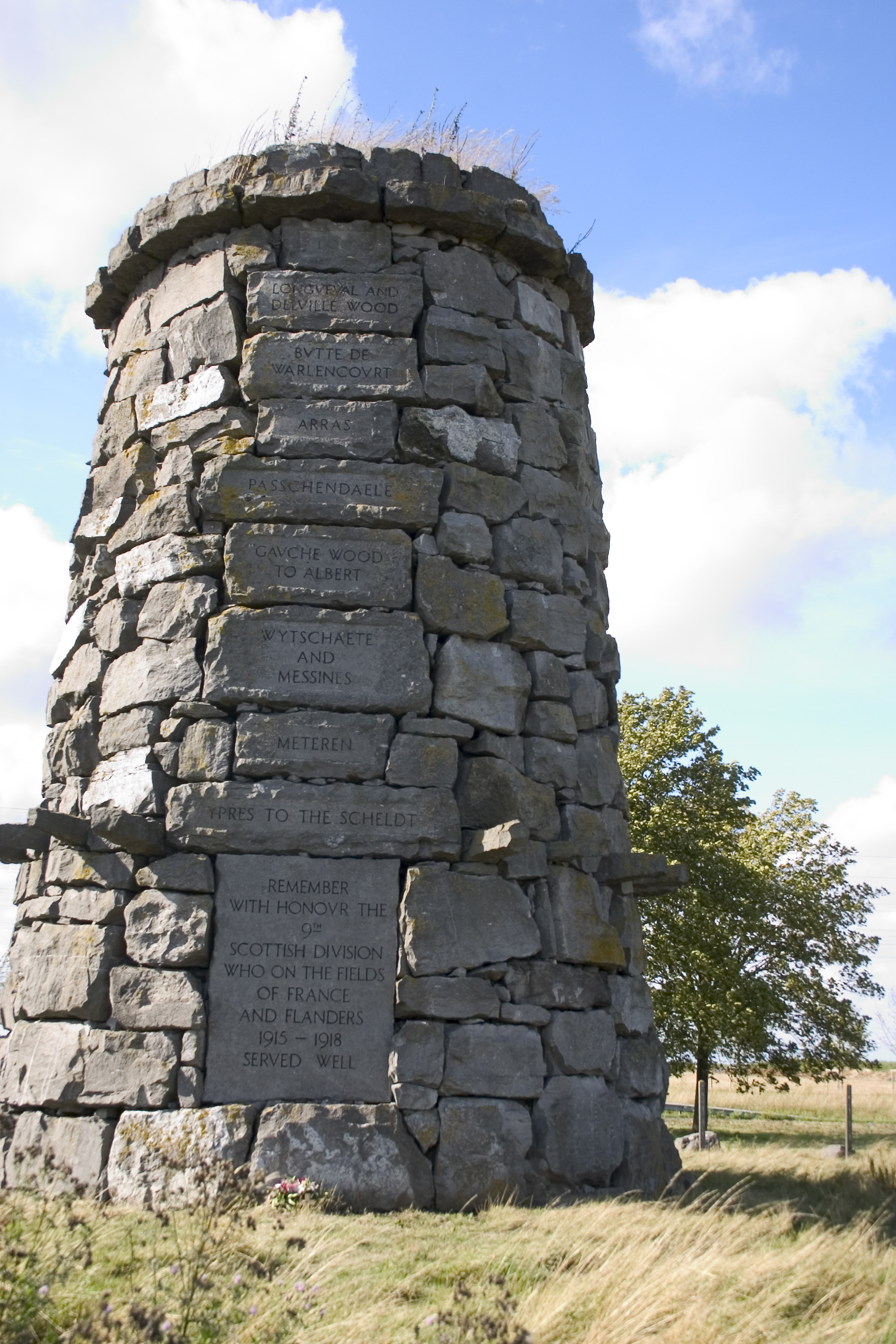
- Scottish war memorial

- Coat of arms
- Location of Athies
- Location within France Location within Hauts-de-France
- Coordinates: 50°18′11″N 2°50′13″E
- Country: France
- Region: Hauts-de-France
- Department: Pas-de-Calais
- Arrondissement: Arras
- Canton: Arras-2
- Intercommunality: CU d'Arras

Government
  - Mayor (2020–2026): Mélanie Pawlak
- Area^{1}: 4.34 km^{2} (1.68 sq mi)
- Elevation: 51 m (167 ft)
- Highest elevation: 103 m (338 ft)
- Lowest elevation: 47 m (154 ft)
- Population (2023): 1,038
  - Density: 239/km^{2} (619/sq mi)
- Time zone: UTC+01:00 (CET)
  - Summer (DST): UTC+02:00 (CEST)
- INSEE/Postal code: 62042 /62223
- ^{1} French Land Register data, which excludes lakes, ponds, glaciers > 1 km^{2} (0.386 sq mi or 247 acres) and river estuaries.

Athies (French pronunciation: [ati]) is a commune in the Pas-de-Calais department in northern France.

== Geography ==
A village located 2 miles (3 km) east of Arras at the junction of the D37 and D42 roads.

== History ==
Initially, Athies was called Atheiae, a word taken from Latin which means ’’hut’’, which indicates than it was a marshy area with shacks for fishermen or peat-gatherers.
In 1493, the village was looted and burned by German soldiers from the garrison of Arras.
A castle stood at the place now called "the Barony". The old church that was destroyed during the 1914-18 war had been built in 1786 just before the French Revolution. Whilst many churches were destroyed during this time, this new church was spared.
The village was invaded several times over the centuries, especially by the Spanish in the 17th century and was all but destroyed during World War I.

== Population ==
Historical population
Year	Pop.	±% p.a.
1968	695	—
1975	697	+0.04%
1982	719	+0.44%
1990	969	+3.80%
1999	930	−0.46%
2007	993	+0.82%
2012	996	+0.06%
2017	1,014	+0.36%
2023	1,038	+0.39%
Source: INSEE

== Sights ==
- The Scottish Monument. Along the Arras - Douai road, the N50, stands a monument created on orders of officers of the 9th Scots Division in memory of the sacrifices made during the First World War.
- The church of St.Christopher, dating from the twentieth century.
- The World War I cemetery.

== See also ==
- Communes of the Pas-de-Calais department
- Laon-Athies Air Base
