= Mondicourt =

- Commune
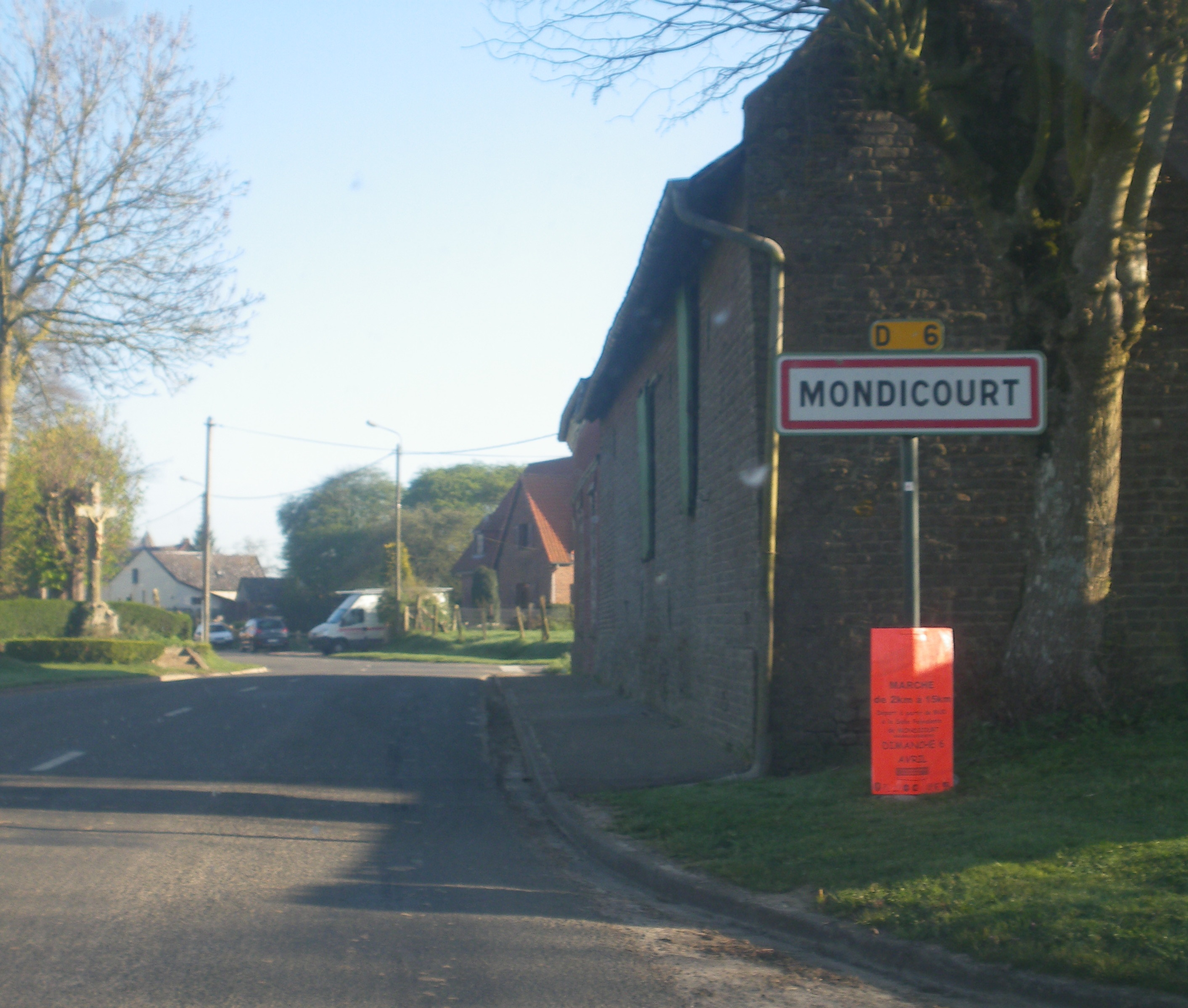
- Entrance to the commune

- Coat of arms
- Location of Mondicourt
- Location within France Location within Hauts-de-France
- Coordinates: 50°10′28″N 2°27′50″E
- Country: France
- Region: Hauts-de-France
- Department: Pas-de-Calais
- Arrondissement: Arras
- Canton: Avesnes-le-Comte
- Intercommunality: CC Campagnes de l'Artois

Government
  - Mayor (2020–2026): Stéphane Gomes
- Area^{1}: 5.06 km^{2} (1.95 sq mi)
- Elevation: 162 m (531 ft)
- Highest elevation: 169 m (554 ft)
- Lowest elevation: 105 m (344 ft)
- Population (2023): 600
  - Density: 120/km^{2} (310/sq mi)
- Time zone: UTC+01:00 (CET)
  - Summer (DST): UTC+02:00 (CEST)
- INSEE/Postal code: 62583 /62760
- ^{1} French Land Register data, which excludes lakes, ponds, glaciers > 1 km^{2} (0.386 sq mi or 247 acres) and river estuaries.

Mondicourt (French pronunciation: [mɔ̃dikuʁ]) is a commune in the Pas-de-Calais department in the Hauts-de-France region of France 19 miles (31 km) southwest of Arras on the border with the department of the Somme.

== Population ==
Historical population
Year	Pop.	±% p.a.
1968	623	—
1975	692	+1.51%
1982	741	+0.98%
1990	662	−1.40%
1999	676	+0.23%
2007	658	−0.34%
2012	628	−0.93%
2017	592	−1.17%
2023	600	+0.22%
Source: INSEE

== See also ==
- Communes of the Pas-de-Calais department
