= Canton of Vimy =

Former canton of France

Coordinates: 50°22′N 2°49′E

The Canton of Vimy was a canton in northern France, in the Pas-de-Calais département. It was disbanded following the French canton reorganisation which came into effect in March 2015. It consisted of 20 communes, and had 22,749 inhabitants in 2012.
