= Sarton, Pas-de-Calais =

Sarton
- Commune
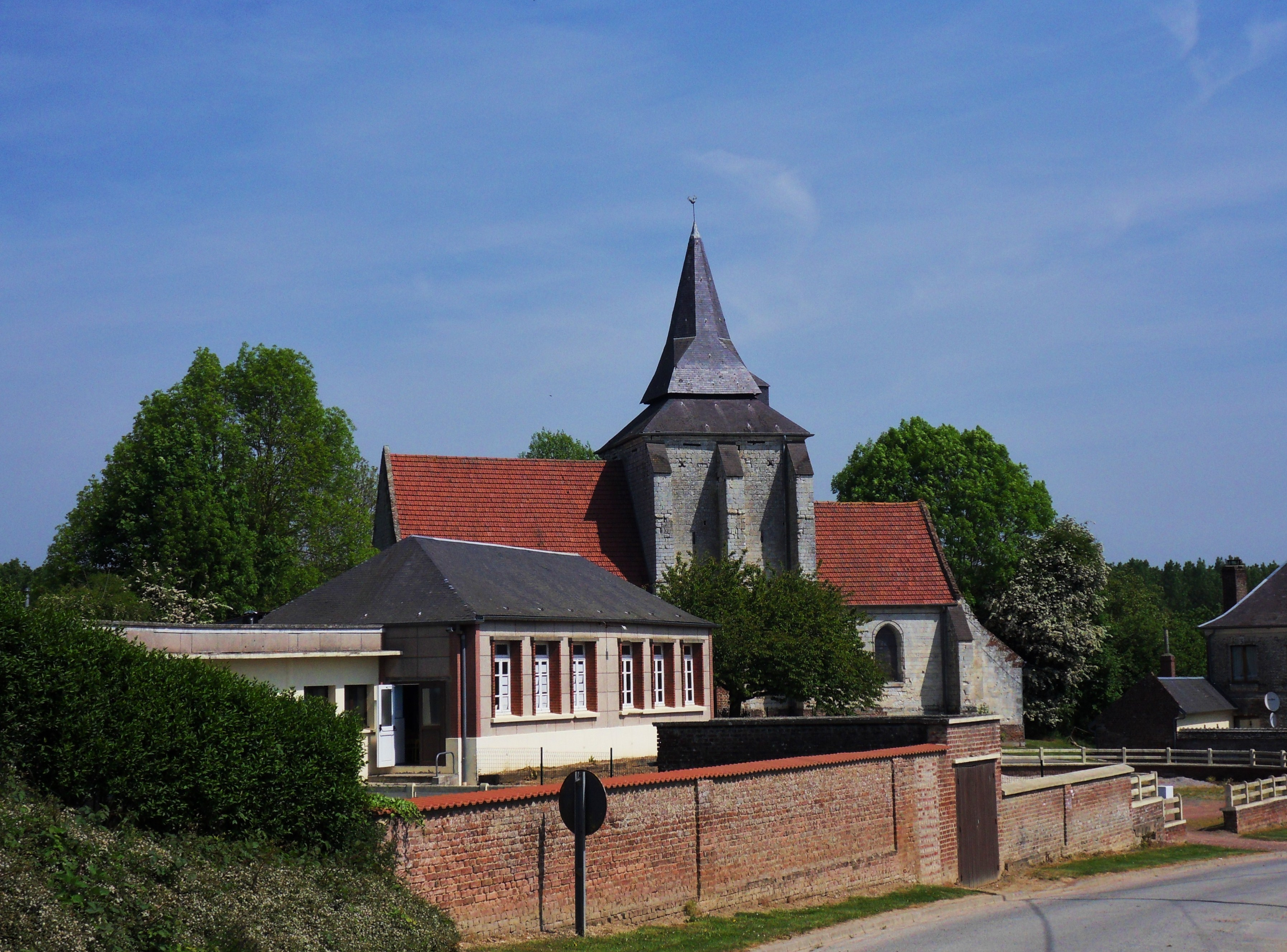
- The church of Sarton

- Coat of arms
- Location of Sarton
- Location within France Location within Hauts-de-France
- Coordinates: 50°07′18″N 2°26′01″E
- Country: France
- Region: Hauts-de-France
- Department: Pas-de-Calais
- Arrondissement: Arras
- Canton: Avesnes-le-Comte
- Intercommunality: CC Campagnes de l'Artois

Government
  - Mayor (2020–2026): Alexandre Decry
- Area^{1}: 6.6 km^{2} (2.5 sq mi)
- Elevation: 74 m (243 ft)
- Highest elevation: 131 m (430 ft)
- Lowest elevation: 67 m (220 ft)
- Population (2023): 182
  - Density: 28/km^{2} (71/sq mi)
- Time zone: UTC+01:00 (CET)
  - Summer (DST): UTC+02:00 (CEST)
- INSEE/Postal code: 62779 /62760
- ^{1} French Land Register data, which excludes lakes, ponds, glaciers > 1 km^{2} (0.386 sq mi or 247 acres) and river estuaries.

Sarton (French pronunciation: [saʁtɔ̃]) is a commune in the Pas-de-Calais department in the Hauts-de-France region of France.

== Geography ==
Sarton lies on the banks of the river Authie, some 23 miles (37 km) southwest of Arras, at the junction of the D1E and D938 roads.

The average altitude of Sarton is 74 meters, and its surface area is 6.6 km^{2}.

== Population ==
The inhabitants are called Sartonais in French.

Historical population
Year	Pop.	±% p.a.
1968	206	—
1975	200	−0.42%
1982	163	−2.88%
1990	150	−1.03%
1999	162	+0.86%
2007	173	+0.82%
2012	180	+0.80%
2017	183	+0.33%
2023	182	−0.09%
Source: INSEE

== Places of interest ==
- The church of Notre-Dame, dating from the sixteenth century.
- An old mill.
- Les Jardins de Sans-Soucis (the Worriless Gardens), a garden built in 1998 around a 16th to 17th century manor with topiaries, including a collection of old garden tools and a permanent art exhibition.

== See also ==
Communes of the Pas-de-Calais department
