= Canton of Arras-Ouest =

Coordinates: 50.2833°N 2.7833°E

Arras-Ouest
- Former canton
- Interactive map of Arras-Ouest
- Country: France
- Region: Hauts-de-France
- Department: Pas-de-Calais
- No. of communes: {{{nbcomm}}}
- Disbanded: 2015
- Population (2012): 21,404

The Canton of Arras-Ouest is a former canton situated in the department of the Pas-de-Calais and in the Nord-Pas-de-Calais region of northern France. It was disbanded following the French canton reorganisation which came into effect in March 2015. The canton comprised part of the commune of Arras. It had a total of 21,404 inhabitants (2012).

== See also ==
- Cantons of Pas-de-Calais
- Communes of Pas-de-Calais
- Arrondissements of the Pas-de-Calais department
