= Orville, Pas-de-Calais =

Orville
- Commune
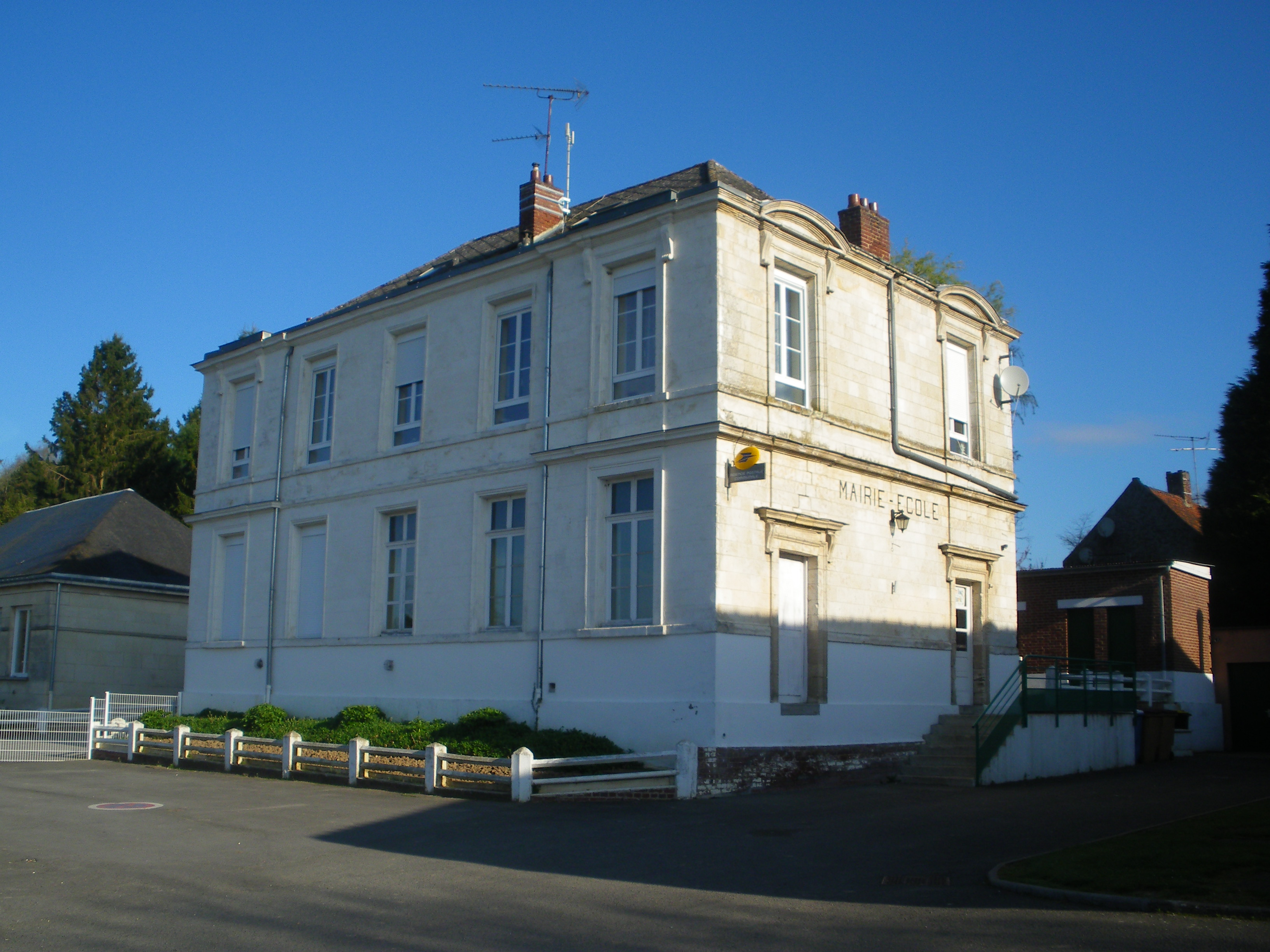
- The town hall and school of Orville

- Coat of arms
- Location of Orville
- Location within France Location within Hauts-de-France
- Coordinates: 50°08′04″N 2°24′45″E
- Country: France
- Region: Hauts-de-France
- Department: Pas-de-Calais
- Arrondissement: Arras
- Canton: Avesnes-le-Comte
- Intercommunality: CC Campagnes de l'Artois

Government
  - Mayor (2020–2026): Alain Débureaux
- Area^{1}: 11.95 km^{2} (4.61 sq mi)
- Elevation: 70 m (230 ft)
- Highest elevation: 148 m (486 ft)
- Lowest elevation: 64 m (210 ft)
- Population (2023): 341
  - Density: 28.5/km^{2} (73.9/sq mi)
- Time zone: UTC+01:00 (CET)
  - Summer (DST): UTC+02:00 (CEST)
- INSEE/Postal code: 62640 /62760
- ^{1} French Land Register data, which excludes lakes, ponds, glaciers > 1 km^{2} (0.386 sq mi or 247 acres) and river estuaries.

Orville (French pronunciation: [ɔʁvil]) is a commune in the Pas-de-Calais department in the Hauts-de-France region of France 20 miles (32 km) southwest of Arras, by the banks of the river Authie, on the border with the department of the Somme.

== Population ==
Historical population
Year	Pop.	±% p.a.
1968	409	—
1975	318	−3.53%
1982	277	−1.95%
1990	325	+2.02%
1999	325	+0.00%
2007	339	+0.53%
2012	407	+3.72%
2017	402	−0.25%
2023	341	−2.71%
Source: INSEE

== See also ==
- Communes of the Pas-de-Calais department
