= Hannescamps =

- Commune
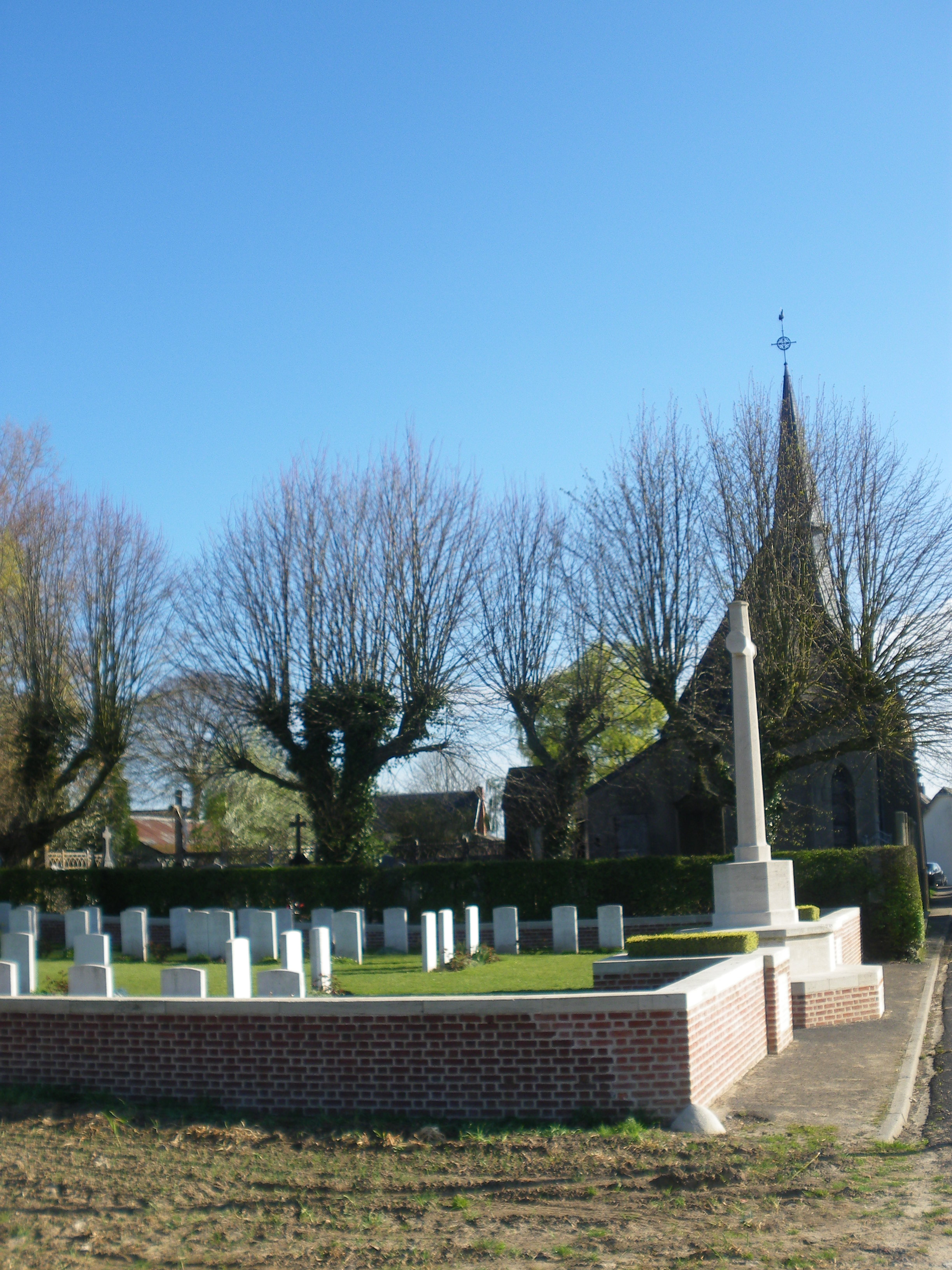
- The military cemetery and church of Hannescamps

- Coat of arms
- Location of Hannescamps
- Location within France Location within Hauts-de-France
- Coordinates: 50°10′02″N 2°38′26″E
- Country: France
- Region: Hauts-de-France
- Department: Pas-de-Calais
- Arrondissement: Arras
- Canton: Avesnes-le-Comte
- Intercommunality: CC Campagnes de l'Artois

Government
  - Mayor (2020–2026): Ernest Auchart
- Area^{1}: 3.17 km^{2} (1.22 sq mi)
- Elevation: 144 m (472 ft)
- Highest elevation: 158 m (518 ft)
- Lowest elevation: 130 m (430 ft)
- Population (2023): 205
  - Density: 64.7/km^{2} (167/sq mi)
- Time zone: UTC+01:00 (CET)
  - Summer (DST): UTC+02:00 (CEST)
- INSEE/Postal code: 62409 /62111
- ^{1} French Land Register data, which excludes lakes, ponds, glaciers > 1 km^{2} (0.386 sq mi or 247 acres) and river estuaries.

Hannescamps is a commune in the Pas-de-Calais department in the Hauts-de-France region of France 13 miles (21 km) southwest of Arras.

== Population ==
Historical population
Year	Pop.	±% p.a.
1968	139	—
1975	107	−3.67%
1982	101	−0.82%
1990	133	+3.50%
1999	149	+1.27%
2007	183	+2.60%
2012	195	+1.28%
2017	196	+0.10%
2023	205	+0.75%
Source: INSEE

== See also ==
- Communes of the Pas-de-Calais department
