= Tincques =

- Commune
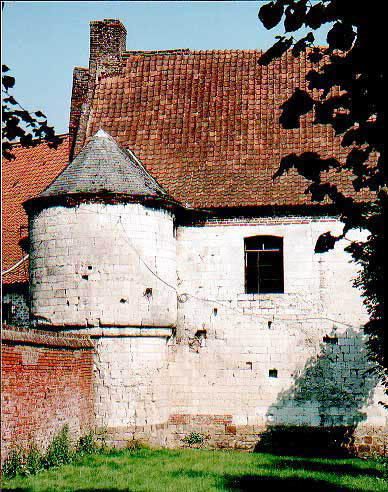
- A building within Tincques

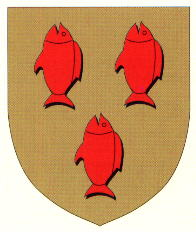
- Coat of arms
- Location of Tincques
- Location within France Location within Hauts-de-France
- Coordinates: 50°21′31″N 2°29′34″E
- Country: France
- Region: Hauts-de-France
- Department: Pas-de-Calais
- Arrondissement: Arras
- Canton: Avesnes-le-Comte
- Intercommunality: CC Campagnes de l'Artois

Government
  - Mayor (2020–2026): Jacques Thellier
- Area^{1}: 10.68 km^{2} (4.12 sq mi)
- Elevation: 117 m (384 ft)
- Highest elevation: 148 m (486 ft)
- Lowest elevation: 107 m (351 ft)
- Population (2023): 818
  - Density: 76.6/km^{2} (198/sq mi)
- Time zone: UTC+01:00 (CET)
  - Summer (DST): UTC+02:00 (CEST)
- INSEE/Postal code: 62820 /62127
- ^{1} French Land Register data, which excludes lakes, ponds, glaciers > 1 km^{2} (0.386 sq mi or 247 acres) and river estuaries.

Tincques (French pronunciation: [tɛ̃k]) is a commune in the Pas-de-Calais department in the Hauts-de-France region of France.

== Geography ==
Tincques lies 15 miles (24 km) west of Arras, at the junction of the N39 and D77 roads.

== Population ==
Historical population
Year	Pop.	±% p.a.
1968	734	—
1975	736	+0.04%
1982	703	−0.65%
1990	738	+0.61%
1999	811	+1.05%
2007	886	+1.11%
2012	869	−0.39%
2017	825	−1.03%
2023	818	−0.14%
Source: INSEE

== Places of interest ==
- The church of St. Hilaire, dating from the seventeenth century.
- A chateau and a farmhouse, both dating from the seventeenth century.

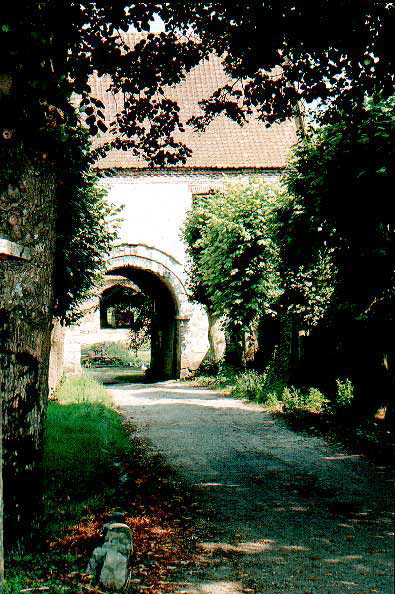
The chateau gatehouse

== See also ==
- Communes of the Pas-de-Calais department
