= Berles-au-Bois =

- Commune
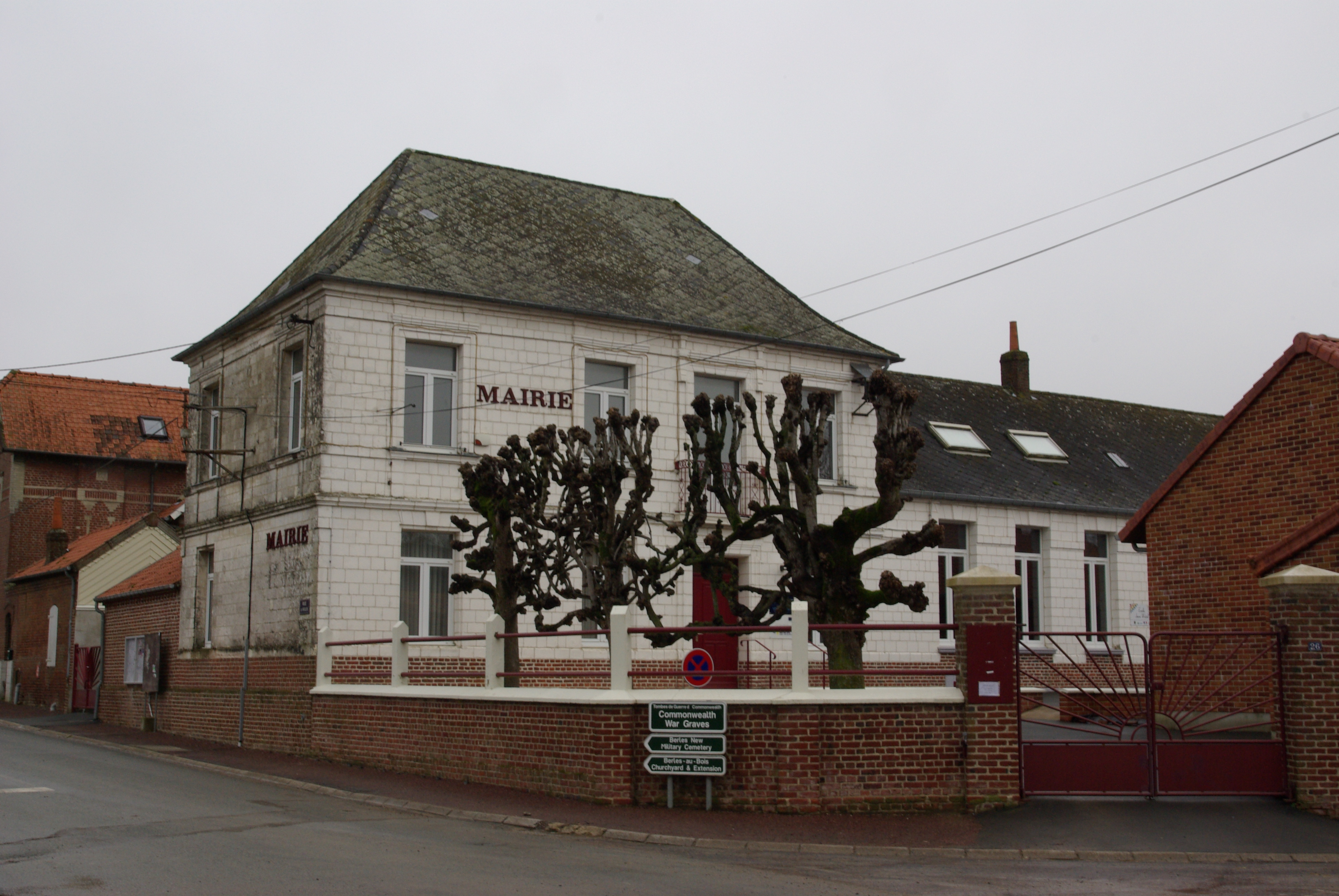
- The town hall of Berles-au-Bois

- Coat of arms
- Location of Berles-au-Bois
- Location within France Location within Hauts-de-France
- Coordinates: 50°11′51″N 2°37′48″E
- Country: France
- Region: Hauts-de-France
- Department: Pas-de-Calais
- Arrondissement: Arras
- Canton: Avesnes-le-Comte
- Intercommunality: CC Campagnes de l'Artois

Government
  - Mayor (2020–2026): Michel Petit
- Area^{1}: 8.9 km^{2} (3.4 sq mi)
- Elevation: 102 m (335 ft)
- Highest elevation: 159 m (522 ft)
- Lowest elevation: 105 m (344 ft)
- Population (2023): 553
  - Density: 62/km^{2} (160/sq mi)
- Time zone: UTC+01:00 (CET)
  - Summer (DST): UTC+02:00 (CEST)
- INSEE/Postal code: 62112 /62123
- ^{1} French Land Register data, which excludes lakes, ponds, glaciers > 1 km^{2} (0.386 sq mi or 247 acres) and river estuaries.

Berles-au-Bois (French pronunciation: [bɛʁl o bwa]) is a commune in the Pas-de-Calais department in the Hauts-de-France region in northern France.

== Geography ==
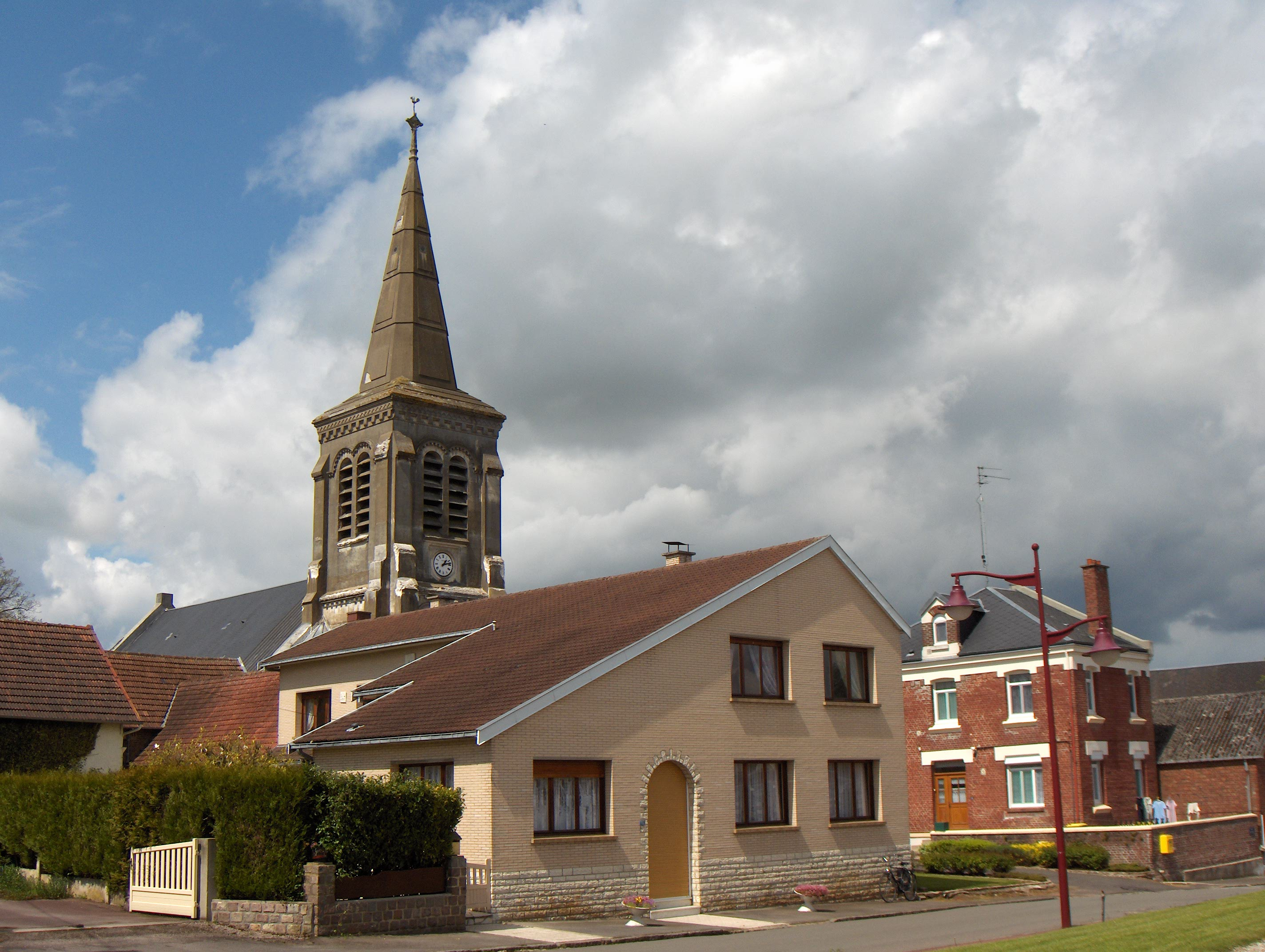
Berles-au-Bois

A farming village located 11 miles (17 km) southwest of Arras on the D62 junction with the D30 road.

== Population ==
Historical population
Year	Pop.	±% p.a.
1968	557	—
1975	524	−0.87%
1982	531	+0.19%
1990	524	−0.17%
1999	485	−0.86%
2007	499	+0.36%
2012	515	+0.63%
2017	515	+0.00%
2023	553	+1.19%
Source: INSEE

== Sights ==
- Remains of a 13th-century château.
- The church of Saint-Pierre, rebuilt, like most of the village after the ravages of World War I.
- Three World War I cemeteries.

== See also ==
- Communes of the Pas-de-Calais department
