= Monchy-Breton =

- Commune
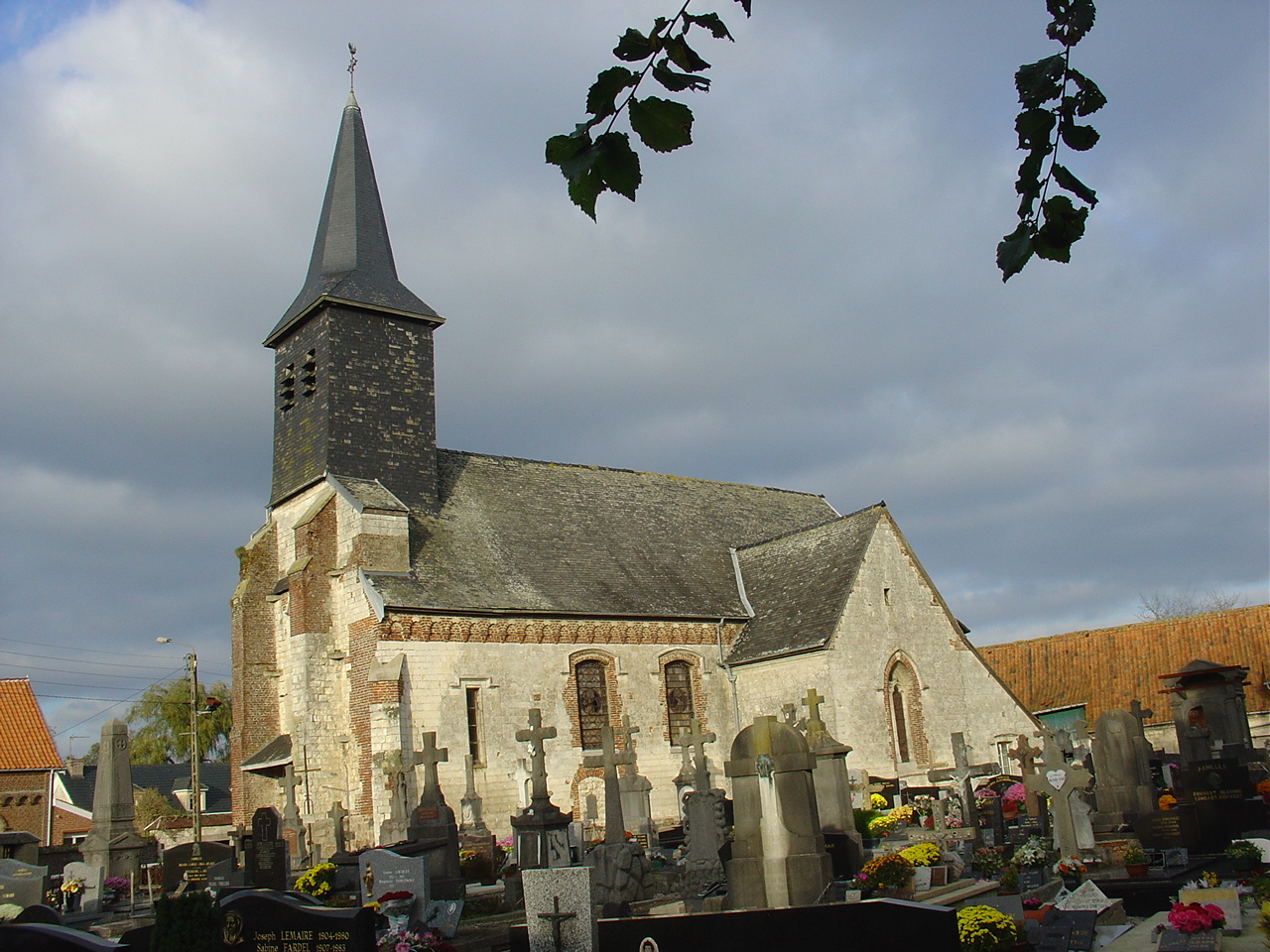
- The church of Monchy-Breton

- Coat of arms
- Location of Monchy-Breton
- Location within France Location within Hauts-de-France
- Coordinates: 50°24′06″N 2°26′45″E
- Country: France
- Region: Hauts-de-France
- Department: Pas-de-Calais
- Arrondissement: Arras
- Canton: Saint-Pol-sur-Ternoise
- Intercommunality: CC Ternois

Government
  - Mayor (2020–2026): Nicole Godart
- Area^{1}: 6.9 km^{2} (2.7 sq mi)
- Elevation: 146 m (479 ft)
- Highest elevation: 162 m (531 ft)
- Lowest elevation: 111 m (364 ft)
- Population (2023): 512
  - Density: 74/km^{2} (190/sq mi)
- Time zone: UTC+01:00 (CET)
  - Summer (DST): UTC+02:00 (CEST)
- INSEE/Postal code: 62580 /62127
- ^{1} French Land Register data, which excludes lakes, ponds, glaciers > 1 km^{2} (0.386 sq mi or 247 acres) and river estuaries.

Monchy-Breton (French pronunciation: [mɔ̃ʃi bʁətɔ̃]) is a commune in the Pas-de-Calais department in the Hauts-de-France region of France 11 miles (18 km) northwest of Arras.

== Population ==
Historical population
Year	Pop.	±% p.a.
1968	390	—
1975	352	−1.45%
1982	351	−0.04%
1990	388	+1.26%
1999	389	+0.03%
2007	411	+0.69%
2012	430	+0.91%
2017	476	+2.05%
2023	512	+1.22%
Source: INSEE

== See also ==
- Communes of the Pas-de-Calais department
