= Villers-Brûlin =

- Commune
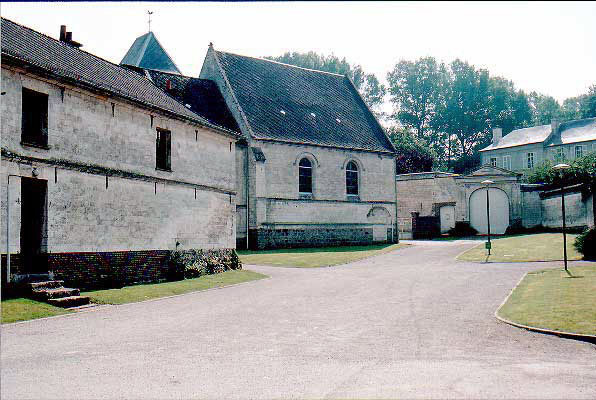
- The centre of Villers-Brûlin

- Coat of arms
- Location of Villers-Brûlin
- Location within France Location within Hauts-de-France
- Coordinates: 50°22′05″N 2°32′19″E
- Country: France
- Region: Hauts-de-France
- Department: Pas-de-Calais
- Arrondissement: Arras
- Canton: Avesnes-le-Comte
- Intercommunality: CC Campagnes de l'Artois

Government
  - Mayor (2020–2026): Louis Lambert
- Area^{1}: 3.81 km^{2} (1.47 sq mi)
- Elevation: 125 m (410 ft)
- Highest elevation: 153 m (502 ft)
- Lowest elevation: 110 m (360 ft)
- Population (2023): 368
  - Density: 96.6/km^{2} (250/sq mi)
- Time zone: UTC+01:00 (CET)
  - Summer (DST): UTC+02:00 (CEST)
- INSEE/Postal code: 62856 /62690
- ^{1} French Land Register data, which excludes lakes, ponds, glaciers > 1 km^{2} (0.386 sq mi or 247 acres) and river estuaries.

Villers-Brûlin (French pronunciation: [vilɛʁ bʁylɛ̃]) is a commune in the Pas-de-Calais department in the Hauts-de-France region of France 15 miles (24 km) northwest of Arras.

== Population ==
Historical population
Year	Pop.	±% p.a.
1968	289	—
1975	270	−0.97%
1982	278	+0.42%
1990	315	+1.57%
1999	300	−0.54%
2007	304	+0.17%
2012	301	−0.20%
2017	365	+3.93%
2023	368	+0.14%
Source: INSEE

== See also ==
- Communes of the Pas-de-Calais department
