= Saint-Nicolas, Pas-de-Calais =

Saint-Nicolas Sint-Niklaas
- Commune
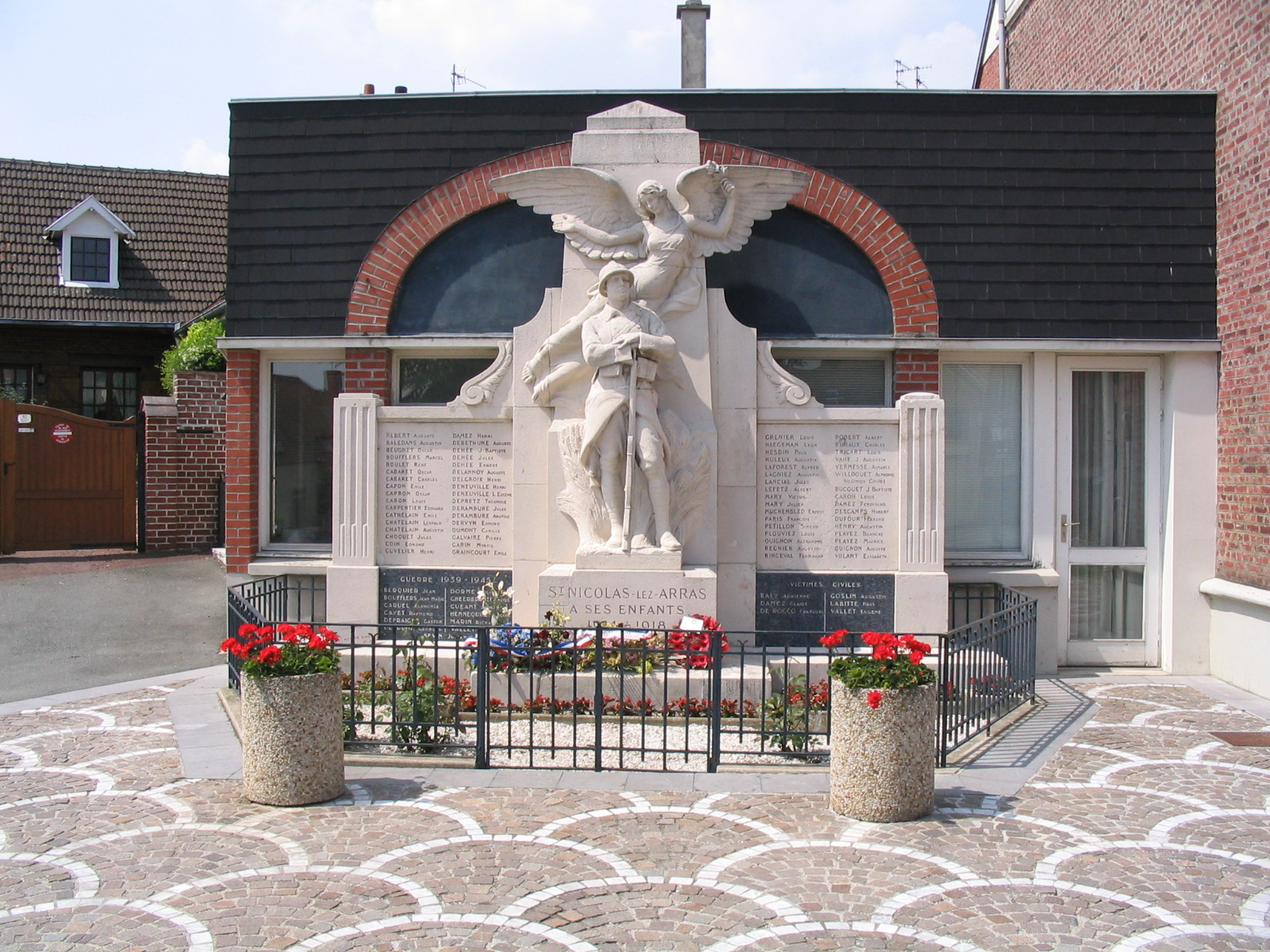
- The monument to the dead of Saint-Nicolas

- Coat of arms
- Location of Saint-Nicolas
- Location within France Location within Hauts-de-France
- Coordinates: 50°18′11″N 2°46′41″E
- Country: France
- Region: Hauts-de-France
- Department: Pas-de-Calais
- Arrondissement: Arras
- Canton: Arras-2
- Intercommunality: CU d'Arras

Government
  - Mayor (2020–2026): Alain Cayet
- Area^{1}: 3.19 km^{2} (1.23 sq mi)
- Elevation: 80 m (260 ft)
- Highest elevation: 102 m (335 ft)
- Lowest elevation: 52 m (171 ft)
- Population (2023): 4,494
  - Density: 1,410/km^{2} (3,650/sq mi)
- Time zone: UTC+01:00 (CET)
  - Summer (DST): UTC+02:00 (CEST)
- INSEE/Postal code: 62764 /62223
- ^{1} French Land Register data, which excludes lakes, ponds, glaciers > 1 km^{2} (0.386 sq mi or 247 acres) and river estuaries.

Saint-Nicolas (French pronunciation: [sɛ̃ nikɔla]; West Flemish: Sint-Niklaas) or Saint-Nicolas-lez-Arras ([sɛ̃ nikɔla lɛ.z‿aʁas], literally Saint-Nicolas near Arras) is a commune in the Pas-de-Calais department in the Hauts-de-France region of France, a suburb of Arras on the banks of the Scarpe river, 1 mile (1.6 km) north of the centre of Arras.

Lipperode, a part of Lippstadt, in Germany is the twin town of St-Nicolas-lez-Arraz.

== Population ==
Historical population
Year	Pop.	±% p.a.
1968	2,402	—
1975	4,072	+7.83%
1982	6,224	+6.25%
1990	6,121	−0.21%
1999	5,659	−0.87%
2007	5,059	−1.39%
2012	4,660	−1.63%
2017	4,738	+0.33%
2023	4,494	−0.88%
Source: INSEE

== Notable people ==
- Jean Bodel, poet

== See also ==
- Communes of the Pas-de-Calais department
