= Capelle-Fermont =

- Commune
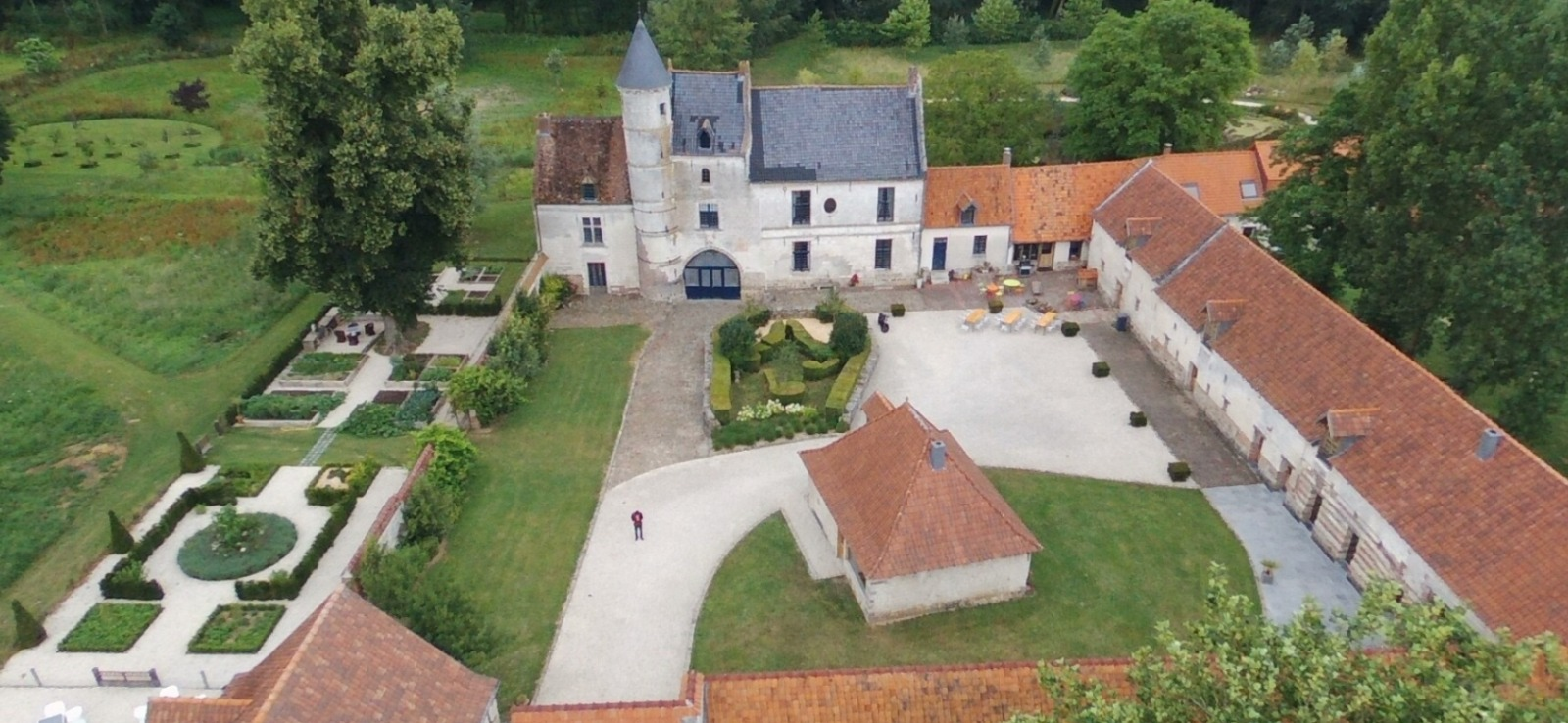
- View of the manor of Fermont.

- Coat of arms
- Location of Capelle-Fermont
- Location within France Location within Hauts-de-France
- Coordinates: 50°21′10″N 2°37′01″E
- Country: France
- Region: Hauts-de-France
- Department: Pas-de-Calais
- Arrondissement: Arras
- Canton: Avesnes-le-Comte
- Intercommunality: CC Campagnes de l'Artois

Government
  - Mayor (2020–2026): Sabine Surelle
- Area^{1}: 2.96 km^{2} (1.14 sq mi)
- Elevation: 88 m (289 ft)
- Highest elevation: 122 m (400 ft)
- Lowest elevation: 82 m (269 ft)
- Population (2023): 223
  - Density: 75.3/km^{2} (195/sq mi)
- Time zone: UTC+01:00 (CET)
  - Summer (DST): UTC+02:00 (CEST)
- INSEE/Postal code: 62211 /62690
- ^{1} French Land Register data, which excludes lakes, ponds, glaciers > 1 km^{2} (0.386 sq mi or 247 acres) and river estuaries.

Capelle-Fermont (French pronunciation: [kapɛl fɛʁmɔ̃]) is a commune in the Pas-de-Calais department in the Hauts-de-France region of France 10 miles (16 km) northwest of Arras in the Scarpe valley.

== Population ==
Historical population
Year	Pop.	±% p.a.
1968	92	—
1975	83	−1.46%
1982	105	+3.42%
1990	126	+2.31%
1999	127	+0.09%
2007	184	+4.74%
2012	200	+1.68%
2017	217	+1.64%
2023	223	+0.46%
Source: INSEE

== See also ==
- Communes of the Pas-de-Calais department
