= Haute-Avesnes =

- Commune
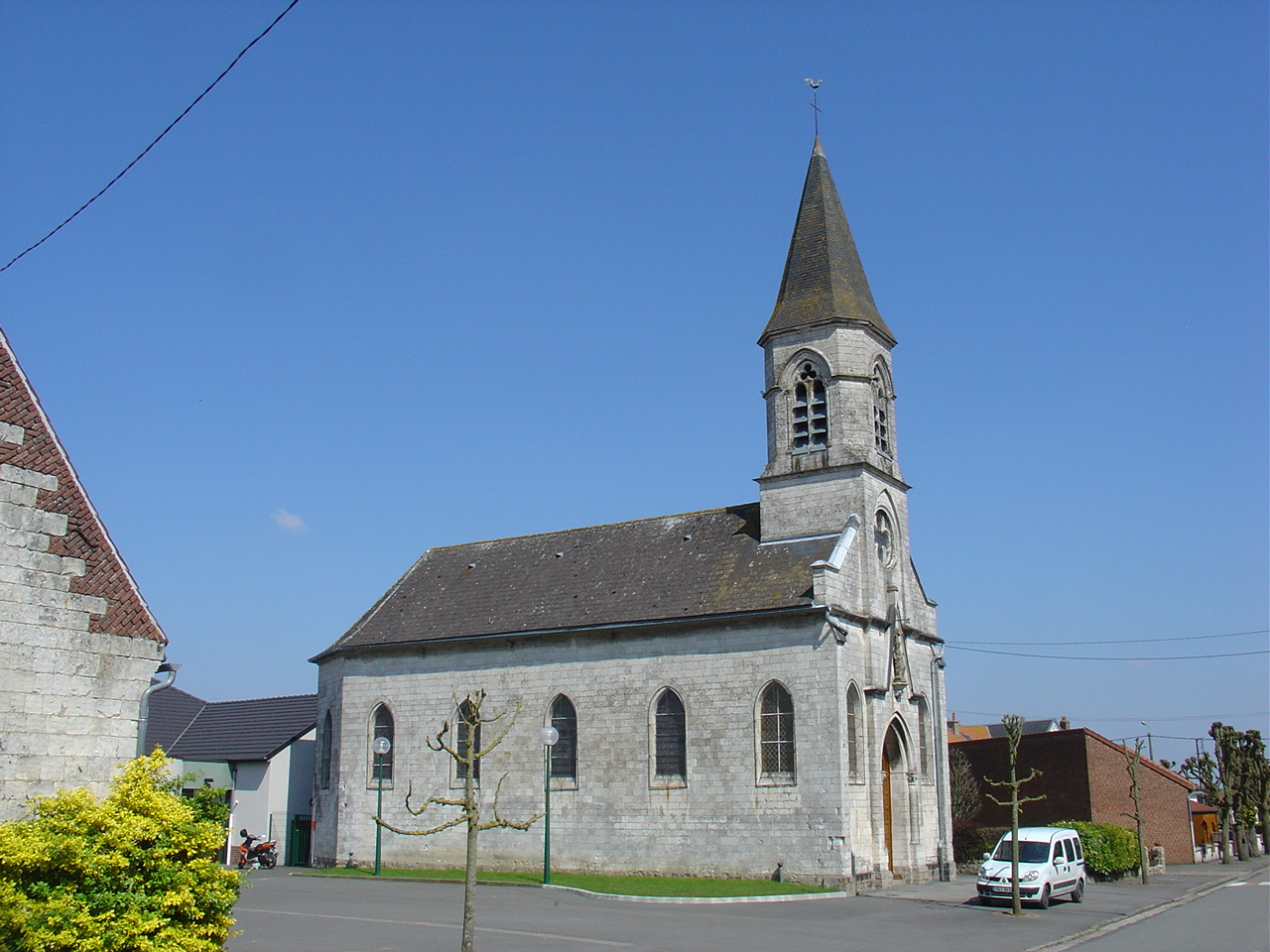
- The church of Haute-Avesnes

- Coat of arms
- Location of Haute-Avesnes
- Location within France Location within Hauts-de-France
- Coordinates: 50°20′00″N 2°38′00″E
- Country: France
- Region: Hauts-de-France
- Department: Pas-de-Calais
- Arrondissement: Arras
- Canton: Avesnes-le-Comte
- Intercommunality: CC Campagnes de l'Artois

Government
  - Mayor (2020–2026): Michel Seroux
- Area^{1}: 3.97 km^{2} (1.53 sq mi)
- Population (2023): 465
  - Density: 117/km^{2} (303/sq mi)
- Time zone: UTC+01:00 (CET)
  - Summer (DST): UTC+02:00 (CEST)
- INSEE/Postal code: 62415 /62144
- ^{1} French Land Register data, which excludes lakes, ponds, glaciers > 1 km^{2} (0.386 sq mi or 247 acres) and river estuaries.

Haute-Avesnes (French pronunciation: [ot avɛn]) is a commune in the Pas-de-Calais department in the Hauts-de-France region of France 6 miles (10 km) west of Arras.

== Population ==
Historical population
Year	Pop.	±% p.a.
1968	247	—
1975	309	+3.25%
1982	405	+3.94%
1990	413	+0.24%
1999	384	−0.81%
2007	395	+0.35%
2012	420	+1.23%
2017	445	+1.16%
2023	465	+0.74%
Source: INSEE

== See also ==
- Communes of the Pas-de-Calais department
