= Hendecourt-lès-Ransart =

- Commune
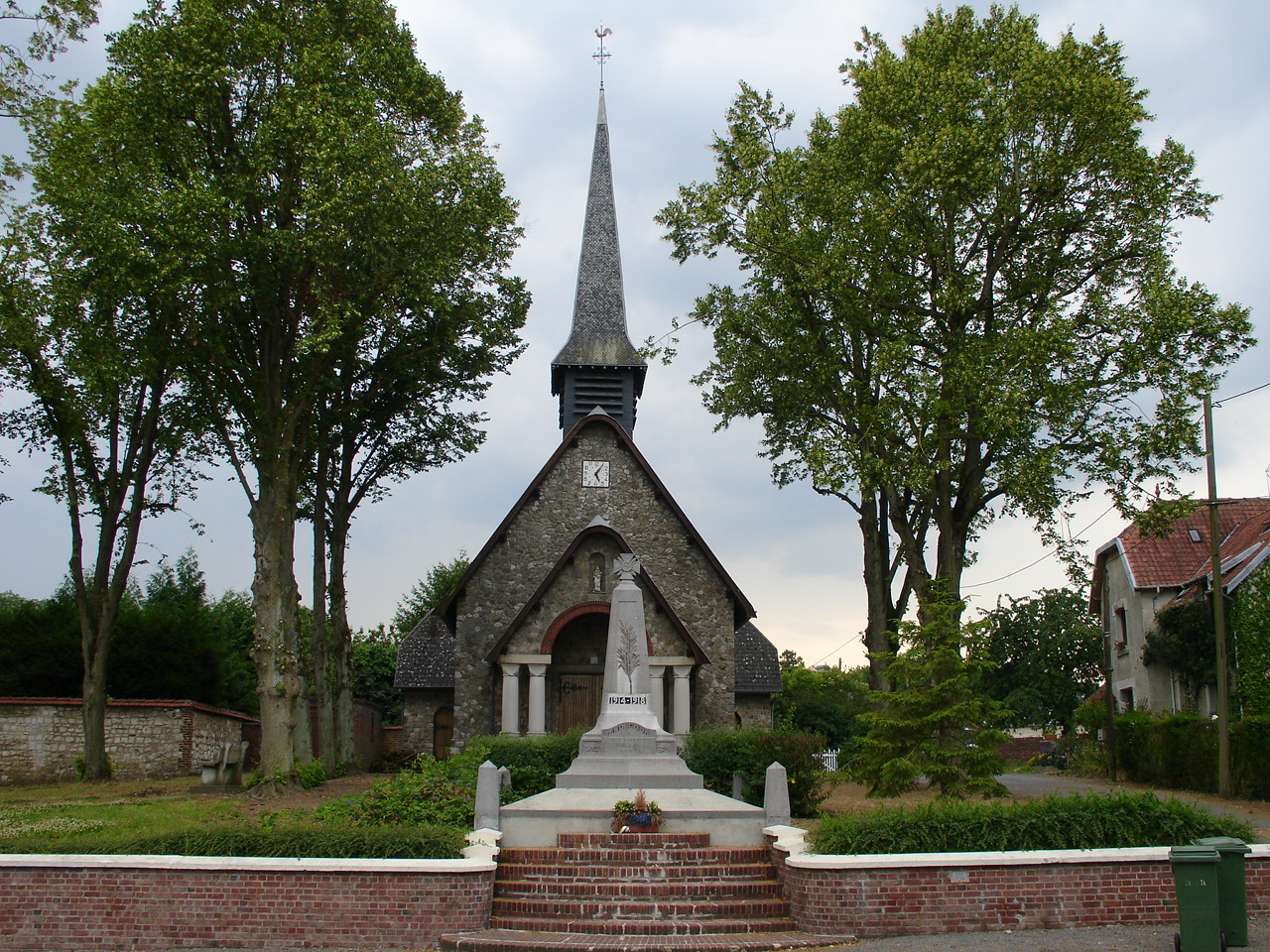
- The church of Hendecourt-lès-Ransart

- Coat of arms
- Location of Hendecourt-lès-Ransart
- Location within France Location within Hauts-de-France
- Coordinates: 50°12′21″N 2°43′59″E
- Country: France
- Region: Hauts-de-France
- Department: Pas-de-Calais
- Arrondissement: Arras
- Canton: Avesnes-le-Comte
- Intercommunality: CC Campagnes de l'Artois

Government
  - Mayor (2020–2026): Pierre Barrois
- Area^{1}: 2.21 km^{2} (0.85 sq mi)
- Elevation: 122 m (400 ft)
- Highest elevation: 124 m (407 ft)
- Lowest elevation: 90 m (300 ft)
- Population (2023): 143
  - Density: 64.7/km^{2} (168/sq mi)
- Time zone: UTC+01:00 (CET)
  - Summer (DST): UTC+02:00 (CEST)
- INSEE/Postal code: 62425 /62175
- ^{1} French Land Register data, which excludes lakes, ponds, glaciers > 1 km^{2} (0.386 sq mi or 247 acres) and river estuaries.

Hendecourt-lès-Ransart (French pronunciation: [ɑ̃dkuʁ lɛ ʁɑ̃saʁ], literally Hendecourt near Ransart) is a commune in the Pas-de-Calais department in the Hauts-de-France region of France 7 miles (11 km) south of Arras.

== Population ==
Historical population
Year	Pop.	±% p.a.
1968	132	—
1975	120	−1.35%
1982	118	−0.24%
1990	123	+0.52%
1999	125	+0.18%
2007	124	−0.10%
2012	122	−0.32%
2017	135	+2.05%
2023	143	+0.96%
Source: INSEE

== See also ==
- Communes of the Pas-de-Calais department
