= Canton of Croisilles =

Coordinates: 50°11′34″N 2°49′56″E

Croisilles
- Former canton
- Location of Croisilles within the arrondissement of Arras
- Country: France
- Region: Hauts-de-France
- Department: Pas-de-Calais
- No. of communes: {{{nbcomm}}}
- Disbanded: 2015
- Area: 186.12 km^{2} (71.86 sq mi)
- Population (2012): 12,194
  - Density: 65.517/km^{2} (169.69/sq mi)

The Canton of Croisilles is a former canton situated in the department of the Pas-de-Calais and in the Nord-Pas-de-Calais region of northern France. It was disbanded following the French canton reorganisation which came into effect in March 2015. It had a total of 12,194 inhabitants (2012).

== Geography ==
The canton is organized around Croisilles in the arrondissement of Arras. The altitude varies from 52m (Chérisy) to 154m (Bucquoy) for an average altitude of 92m.

The canton comprised 27 communes:

- Ablainzevelle
- Ayette
- Boiry-Becquerelle
- Boisleux-au-Mont
- Boisleux-Saint-Marc
- Boyelles
- Bucquoy
- Bullecourt
- Chérisy
- Courcelles-le-Comte
- Croisilles
- Douchy-lès-Ayette
- Écoust-Saint-Mein
- Ervillers
- Fontaine-lès-Croisilles
- Gomiécourt
- Guémappe
- Hamelincourt
- Héninel
- Hénin-sur-Cojeul
- Mory
- Moyenneville
- Noreuil
- Saint-Léger
- Saint-Martin-sur-Cojeul
- Vaulx-Vraucourt
- Wancourt

== Population ==
Population Evolution
1962	1968	1975	1982	1990	1999
9493	9816	9416	10021	10774	10907
Census count starting from 1962 : Population without double counting

== See also ==
- Cantons of Pas-de-Calais
- Communes of Pas-de-Calais
- Arrondissements of the Pas-de-Calais department
