= Communauté de communes du Sud Arrageois =

Coordinates: 50.2°N 2.8784°E

Sud Arrageois
- Former communauté de communes
- Interactive map of Sud Arrageois
- Country: France
- Region: Hauts-de-France
- Department: Pas-de-Calais
- No. of communes: {{{nbcomm}}}
- Established: 1993
- Disbanded: 2013
- Population (1999): 7,508

The Communauté de communes du Sud Arrageois was located in the Pas-de-Calais département, in northern France. It was created in January 1993. It was merged into the new Communauté de communes du Sud-Artois in January 2013.

== Composition ==
It comprised the following 22 communes:

1. Ayette
2. Boiry-Becquerelle
3. Boisleux-au-Mont
4. Boisleux-Saint-Marc
5. Boyelles
6. Bullecourt
7. Chérisy
8. Courcelles-le-Comte
9. Croisilles
10. Écoust-Saint-Mein
11. Ervillers
12. Fontaine-lès-Croisilles
13. Gomiécourt
14. Guémappe
15. Hamelincourt
16. Hénin-sur-Cojeul
17. Héninel
18. Mory
19. Moyenneville
20. Noreuil
21. Saint-Léger
22. Saint-Martin-sur-Cojeul
