= List of aerial victories of Karl Allmenröder =

Karl Allmenröder was a German fighter ace of the First World War, credited with 30 confirmed aerial victories while flying with Jagdstaffel 11.

== List of victories ==
This list is complete for entries, though obviously not for all details. Data was abstracted from Above the Lines: The Aces and Fighter Units of the German Air Service, Naval Air Service and Flanders Marine Corps, 1914–1918, ISBN 0-948817-73-9, ISBN 978-0-948817-73-1, pp. 59–60, and from The Aerodrome webpage Abbreviations from those sources were expanded by editor creating this list.

No.	Date/time	Victim	Squadron	Location
1	16 February 1917 @ 1200 hours	Royal Aircraft Factory B.E.2c	No. 16 Squadron RFC	South of Rouex
2	9 March 1917 @ 1030 hours	Royal Aircraft Factory F.E.8	No. 40 Squadron RFC	Hulluch, France
3	17 March 1917 @ 1145 hours	Sopwith 1½ Strutter	No. 43 Squadron RFC	Oppey
4	21 March 1917 @ 1530 hours	Sopwith 1½ Strutter	No. 43 Squadron RFC	South of Vermelles and Loos, France
5	30 March 1917 @ 1415 hours	Nieuport 17	No. 40 Squadron RFC	Vicinity of Bailleul, France
6	2 April 1917 @ 1035 hours	Royal Aircraft Factory B.E.2	No. 13 Squadron RFC	Southwest of Lens
7	25 April 1917 @ 1030 hours	Royal Aircraft Factory R.E.8	No. 59 Squadron RFC	Guémappe, France
8	26 April 1917 @ 1930 hours	Royal Aircraft Factory B.E.2g	No. 16 Squadron RFC	Vimy, France
9	27 April 1917 @ 2025 hours	Royal Aircraft Factory B.E.2c	No. 2 Squadron RFC	Between Athies and Fampoux, France
10	7 May 1917 @ 1200 hours	Royal Aircraft Factory B.E.2c	No. 13 Squadron RFC	Fresnoy, France
11	10 May 1917 @ 0740 hours	Sopwith Pup	No. 66 Squadron RFC	Vitry, France
12	13 May 1917 @ 1145 hours	Royal Aircraft Factory R.E.8	No. 16 Squadron RFC	Arleux, France
13	13 May 1917 @ 2125 hours	Nieuport 23	No. 29 Squadron RFC	Ostricourt, France
14	14 May 1917 @ 1130 hours	Royal Aircraft Factory B.E.2e	No. 8 Squadron RFC	Guémappe, France
15	18 May 1917 @ 2050 hours	Royal Aircraft Factory B.E.2e	No. 12 Squadron RFC	West of Monchy, France
16	19 May 1917 @ 0910 hours	Sopwith		Fosse 8 de Béthune
17	24 May 1917 @ 0850 hours	Royal Aircraft Factory F.E.2b	No. 11 Squadron RFC	Boiry-Notre-Dame, France
18	24 May 1917 @ 0902 hours	Sopwith 1½ Strutter	No. 43 Squadron RFC	Between Izel and Ferme
19	25 May 1917 @ 1045 hours	Nieuport 23	No. 60 Squadron RFC	Bois de Vert
20	25 May 1917 @ 2045 hours	Airco DH.4	No. 55 Squadron RFC	Monchy
21	28 May 1917 @ 0830 hours	Nieuport	No. 60 Squadron RFC	Between Feuchy and Tilloy-lès-Mofflaines, France
22	29 May 1917 @ 1750 hours	Royal Aircraft Factory B.E.2	No. 5 Squadron RFC	Oppy, Pas-de-Calais, France
23	3 June 1917 @ 0730 hours	Nieuport	No. 60 Squadron RFC	Monchy, France
24	4 June 1917 @ 1925 hours	Royal Aircraft Factory R.E.8	No. 21 Squadron RFC	Cagnicourt, France
25	4 June 1917 @ 2045 hours	Royal Aircraft Factory S.E.5	No. 29 Squadron RFC	Monchy, France
26	5 June 1917 @ 1120 hours	Sopwith 1½ Strutter	No. 45 Squadron RFC	Ypres, Belgium
27	18 June 1917 @ 0950 hours	Nieuport 17	No. 1 Squadron RFC	Valorenhoek, Belgium
28	24 June 1917 @ 0920 hours	Sopwith Triplane	No. 10 Squadron RNAS (Note: The Royal Naval Air Service would be combined with the Royal Flying Corps on 1 April 1918 to become the Royal Air Force.)	Polygon Wood
29	25 June 1917 @ 1846 hours	Sopwith Triplane	No. 10 Squadron RNAS	West of Quesnoy, France
30	26 June 1917 @ 2200 hours	Nieuport	No. 1 Squadron RFC	Ypres, Belgium
