= Communauté urbaine d'Arras =

Coordinates: 50.29°N 2.78°E

Arras
- Communauté urbaine
- Location of Arras within the department
- Country: France
- Region: Hauts-de-France
- Department: Pas-de-Calais
- No. of communes: {{{nbcomm}}}
- Established: 1 January 1998

Government
  - President: Frédéric Leturque
- Area: 306.0 km^{2} (118.1 sq mi)
- Population (2018): 108,347
  - Density: 354.1/km^{2} (917.1/sq mi)
- Website: Official website

The Communauté urbaine d'Arras is the communauté urbaine, an intercommunal structure, centred on the city of Arras. It is located in the Pas-de-Calais department, in the Hauts-de-France region, northern France. It was created in January 1998, replacing the previous district urbain d'Arras. Its area is 306.0 km^{2}. Its population was 108,347 in 2018, of which 41,555 in Arras proper.

== Composition ==
The Communauté urbaine d'Arras consists of the following 46 communes:

1. Achicourt
2. Acq
3. Agny
4. Anzin-Saint-Aubin
5. Arras
6. Athies
7. Bailleul-Sir-Berthoult
8. Basseux
9. Beaumetz-lès-Loges
10. Beaurains
11. Boiry-Becquerelle
12. Boiry-Sainte-Rictrude
13. Boiry-Saint-Martin
14. Boisleux-au-Mont
15. Boisleux-Saint-Marc
16. Boyelles
17. Dainville
18. Écurie
19. Étrun
20. Fampoux
21. Farbus
22. Feuchy
23. Ficheux
24. Gavrelle
25. Guémappe
26. Héninel
27. Hénin-sur-Cojeul
28. Marœuil
29. Mercatel
30. Monchy-le-Preux
31. Mont-Saint-Éloi
32. Neuville-Saint-Vaast
33. Neuville-Vitasse
34. Ransart
35. Rivière
36. Roclincourt
37. Rœux
38. Sainte-Catherine
39. Saint-Laurent-Blangy
40. Saint-Martin-sur-Cojeul
41. Saint-Nicolas
42. Thélus
43. Tilloy-lès-Mofflaines
44. Wailly
45. Wancourt
46. Willerval
