= Canton of Arras-3 =

Coordinates: 50.28°N 2.78°E

The canton of Arras-3 is an administrative division of the Pas-de-Calais department, in northern France. It was created at the French canton reorganisation which came into effect in March 2015. Its seat is in Arras.

It consists of the following communes:

1. Achicourt
2. Agny
3. Arras (partly)
4. Beaurains
5. Boiry-Becquerelle
6. Boisleux-au-Mont
7. Boisleux-Saint-Marc
8. Boyelles
9. Guémappe
10. Héninel
11. Hénin-sur-Cojeul
12. Mercatel
13. Neuville-Vitasse
14. Saint-Martin-sur-Cojeul
15. Tilloy-lès-Mofflaines
16. Wancourt
