= Boiry-Sainte-Rictrude =

- Commune
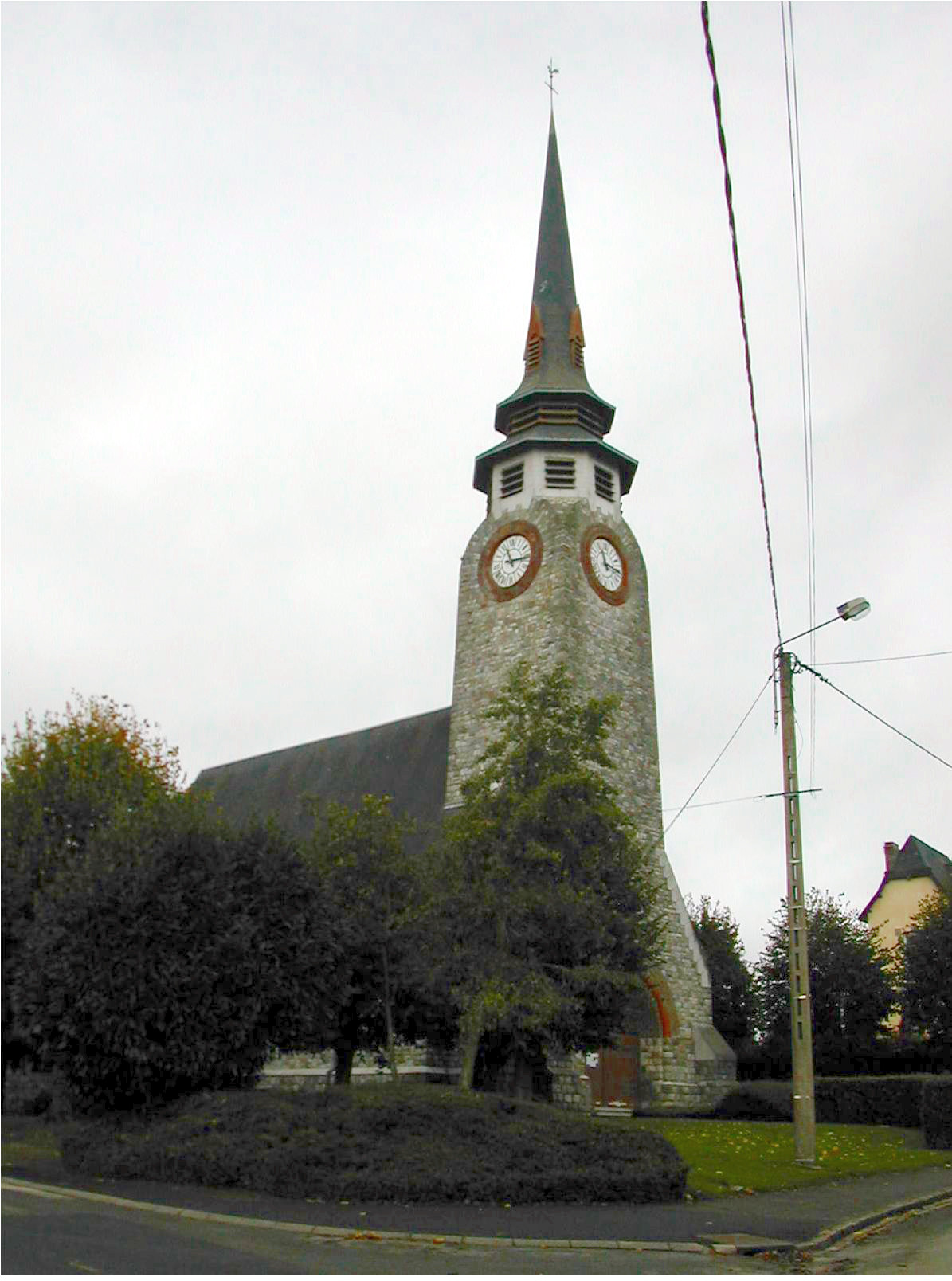
- The church of Boiry-Sainte-Rictrude

- Coat of arms
- Location of Boiry-Sainte-Rictrude
- Location within France Location within Hauts-de-France
- Coordinates: 50°12′09″N 2°45′21″E
- Country: France
- Region: Hauts-de-France
- Department: Pas-de-Calais
- Arrondissement: Arras
- Canton: Avesnes-le-Comte
- Intercommunality: CU Arras

Government
  - Mayor (2020–2026): Jean-Claude Plu
- Area^{1}: 5.81 km^{2} (2.24 sq mi)
- Elevation: 94 m (308 ft)
- Highest elevation: 116 m (381 ft)
- Lowest elevation: 79 m (259 ft)
- Population (2023): 389
  - Density: 67.0/km^{2} (173/sq mi)
- Time zone: UTC+01:00 (CET)
  - Summer (DST): UTC+02:00 (CEST)
- INSEE/Postal code: 62147 /62175
- ^{1} French Land Register data, which excludes lakes, ponds, glaciers > 1 km^{2} (0.386 sq mi or 247 acres) and river estuaries.

Boiry-Sainte-Rictrude (French pronunciation: [bwaʁi sɛ̃t ʁiktʁyd]; Picard: Boury-Sainte-Rictrude) is a commune in the Pas-de-Calais department in the Hauts-de-France region in northern France.

== Geography ==
A farming village located 7 miles (11 km) south of Arras on the D919 road.

== Population ==
Historical population
Year	Pop.	±% p.a.
1968	443	—
1975	475	+1.00%
1982	516	+1.19%
1990	469	−1.19%
1999	411	−1.46%
2007	363	−1.54%
2012	402	+2.06%
2017	406	+0.20%
2023	389	−0.71%
Source: INSEE

== Sights ==
- The church of St. Rictrude, rebuilt after the destruction of the village during World War I.
- The beet sugar factory, one of the largest in France.

== See also ==
- Communes of the Pas-de-Calais department
