= Beaurains =

- Commune
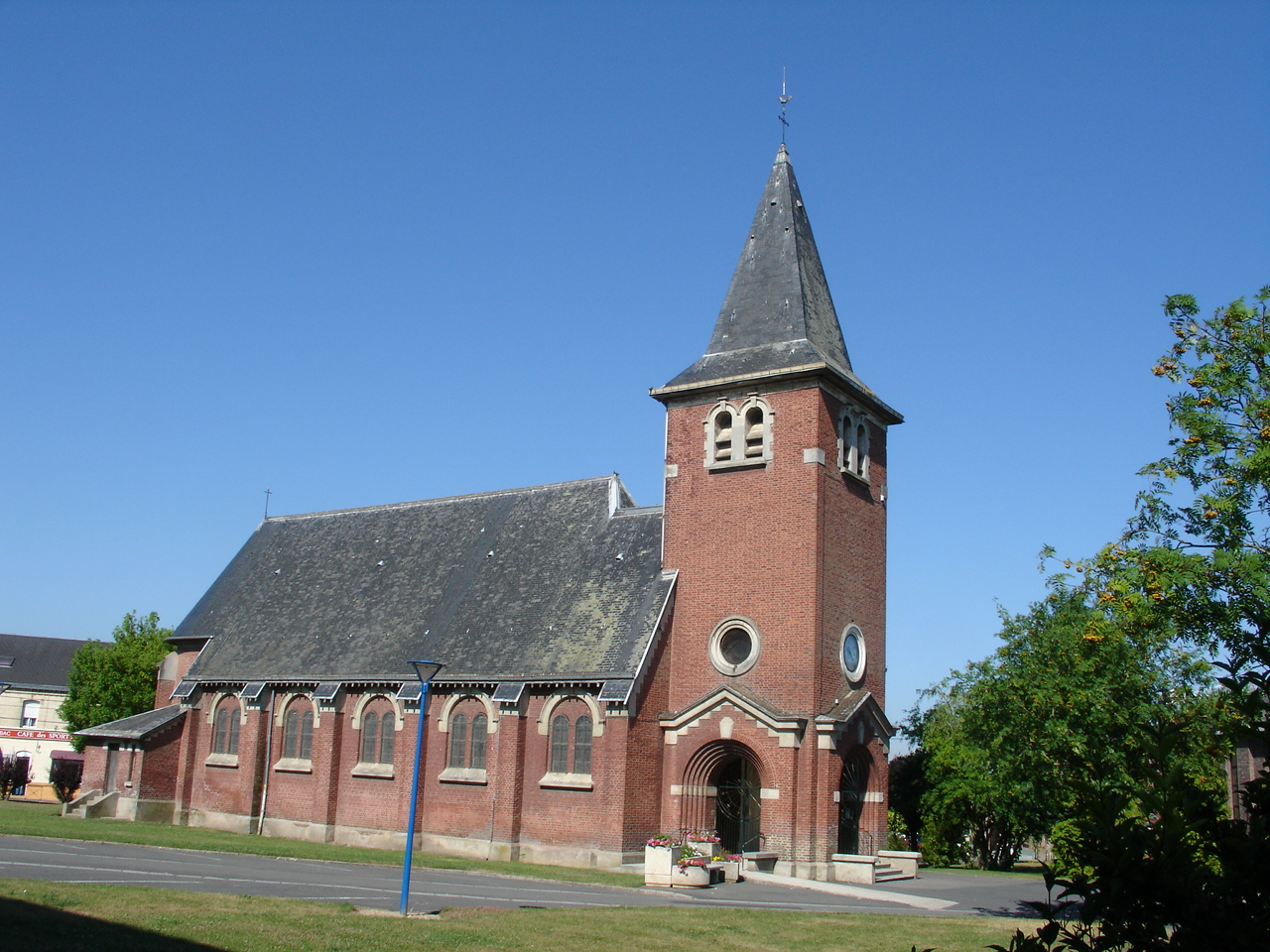
- The church of Beaurains

- Coat of arms
- Location of Beaurains
- Location within France Location within Hauts-de-France
- Coordinates: 50°15′50″N 2°47′22″E
- Country: France
- Region: Hauts-de-France
- Department: Pas-de-Calais
- Arrondissement: Arras
- Canton: Arras-3
- Intercommunality: CU d'Arras

Government
  - Mayor (2024–2026): Cédric Dupond
- Area^{1}: 5.99 km^{2} (2.31 sq mi)
- Elevation: 92 m (302 ft)
- Highest elevation: 99 m (325 ft)
- Lowest elevation: 70 m (230 ft)
- Population (2023): 5,559
  - Density: 928/km^{2} (2,400/sq mi)
- Time zone: UTC+01:00 (CET)
  - Summer (DST): UTC+02:00 (CEST)
- INSEE/Postal code: 62099 /62217
- ^{1} French Land Register data, which excludes lakes, ponds, glaciers > 1 km^{2} (0.386 sq mi or 247 acres) and river estuaries.

Beaurains (French pronunciation: [boʁɛ̃]) is a commune in the Pas-de-Calais department in the Hauts-de-France region in northern France.

== Geography ==
A suburban town located 3 miles (5 km) south of Arras at the junction of the N17 with the D5 road.

== History ==
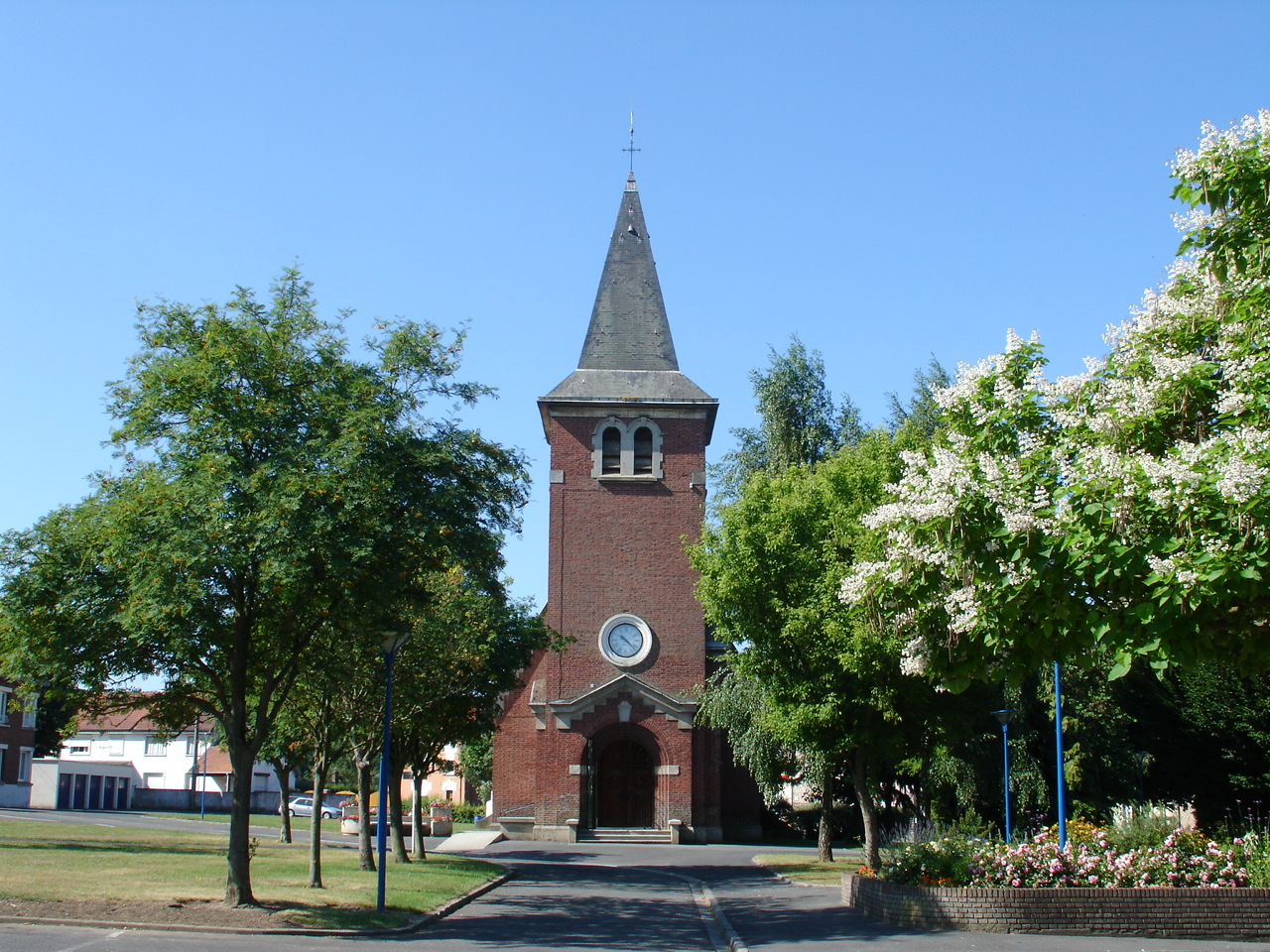
Church in Beaurains

The first church here was built in 674. In the 12th century, the parish council created an important leprosarium that treated Jean Bodel, a French poet.

The commune was all but destroyed during the First World War.

On 21 December 1922, a large treasure was discovered dating from the Roman era. Known as the Beaurains Treasure, much was squandered and the little that remains is now at Arras. However, a silver candelabra, gold coins and some jewellery from the treasure are also in the British Museum.

== Population ==
Historical population
Year	Pop.	±% p.a.
1968	2,012	—
1975	3,982	+10.24%
1982	3,922	−0.22%
1990	4,379	+1.39%
1999	4,708	+0.81%
2007	5,066	+0.92%
2012	5,259	+0.75%
2017	5,662	+1.49%
2023	5,559	−0.31%
Source: INSEE

== Sights ==
- The church of St. Martin, rebuilt after 1918, along with the rest of the village
- Vestiges of an old castle
- Two First World War cemeteries
- The Commonwealth War Graves Commission Visitor Center (CWGC Experience) inaugurated in June 2019.

== Notable people ==
- The 19th-century French playwright and librettist Armand d'Artois was born in the village on 3 October 1788.

== See also ==
- Communes of the Pas-de-Calais department
