= Basseux =

- Commune
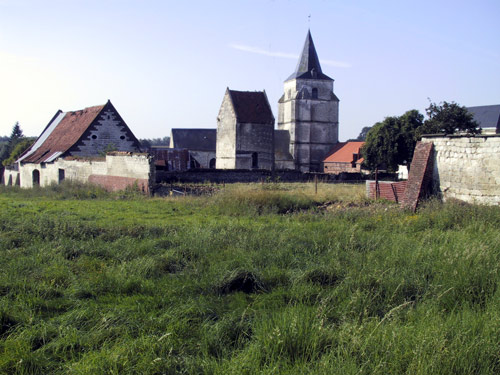
- A general view of Basseux

- Coat of arms
- Location of Basseux
- Location within France Location within Hauts-de-France
- Coordinates: 50°13′38″N 2°38′43″E
- Country: France
- Region: Hauts-de-France
- Department: Pas-de-Calais
- Arrondissement: Arras
- Canton: Avesnes-le-Comte
- Intercommunality: CU d'Arras

Government
  - Mayor (2020–2026): Roger Karpinski
- Area^{1}: 3.35 km^{2} (1.29 sq mi)
- Elevation: 106 m (348 ft)
- Highest elevation: 143 m (469 ft)
- Lowest elevation: 92 m (302 ft)
- Population (2023): 129
  - Density: 38.5/km^{2} (99.7/sq mi)
- Time zone: UTC+01:00 (CET)
  - Summer (DST): UTC+02:00 (CEST)
- INSEE/Postal code: 62085 /62123
- ^{1} French Land Register data, which excludes lakes, ponds, glaciers > 1 km^{2} (0.386 sq mi or 247 acres) and river estuaries.

Basseux (French pronunciation: [basø]) is a commune in the Pas-de-Calais department in the Hauts-de-France region in northern France.

== Geography ==
A small farming village located 8 miles (12 km) southwest of Arras on the D1 road, which follows the route of a Roman road. The small river Crinchon flows by the commune.

== History ==
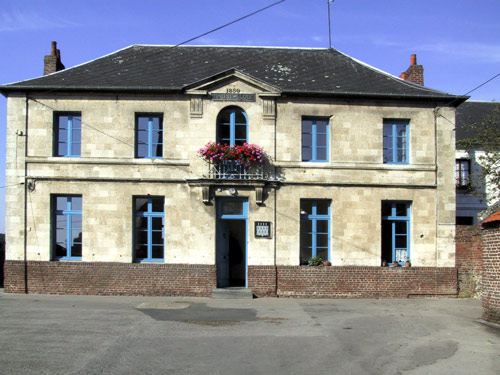
The school

- Mentioned in the 7th century for the first time, as ‘Batsalis’ and later as Batseus (1154) and Basceu in 1277.
- In 1711, the troops of the Marquis de Hautefort, Lieutenant General of the armies of Louis XIV, pillaged the town at the time of the War of Spanish Succession (1700–1713).
- Between 1788 and 1789, a presbytery was built and the village had 217 inhabitants.
- On 8 April 1834, half the village was burnt down. An inscription on the gate of the church recalls the incident:
  "On the 8th April 1834, 17 houses of this village were burned down. They were all rebuilt in the same year by the kindness of King Louis-Philippe of France and the help of the government and the département together with donations from many generous people. This stone was placed by the inhabitants of Basseux in recognition of their benefactors".
- On 1 January 1871, a skirmish took place between French Dragoons and Prussian Uhlans.

== Population ==
Historical population
Year	Pop.	±% p.a.
1968	112	—
1975	126	+1.70%
1982	129	+0.34%
1990	158	+2.57%
1999	149	−0.65%
2007	145	−0.34%
2012	137	−1.13%
2017	137	+0.00%
2023	129	−1.00%
Source: INSEE

== Sights ==
- The war cemetery.
- The church of Notre-Dame, dating from the twelfth century.

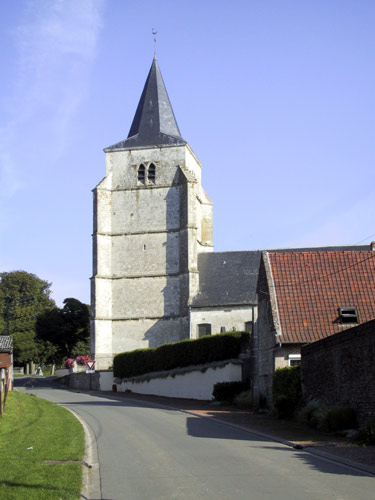
The church

== See also ==
- Communes of the Pas-de-Calais department
