= Mercatel =

- Commune
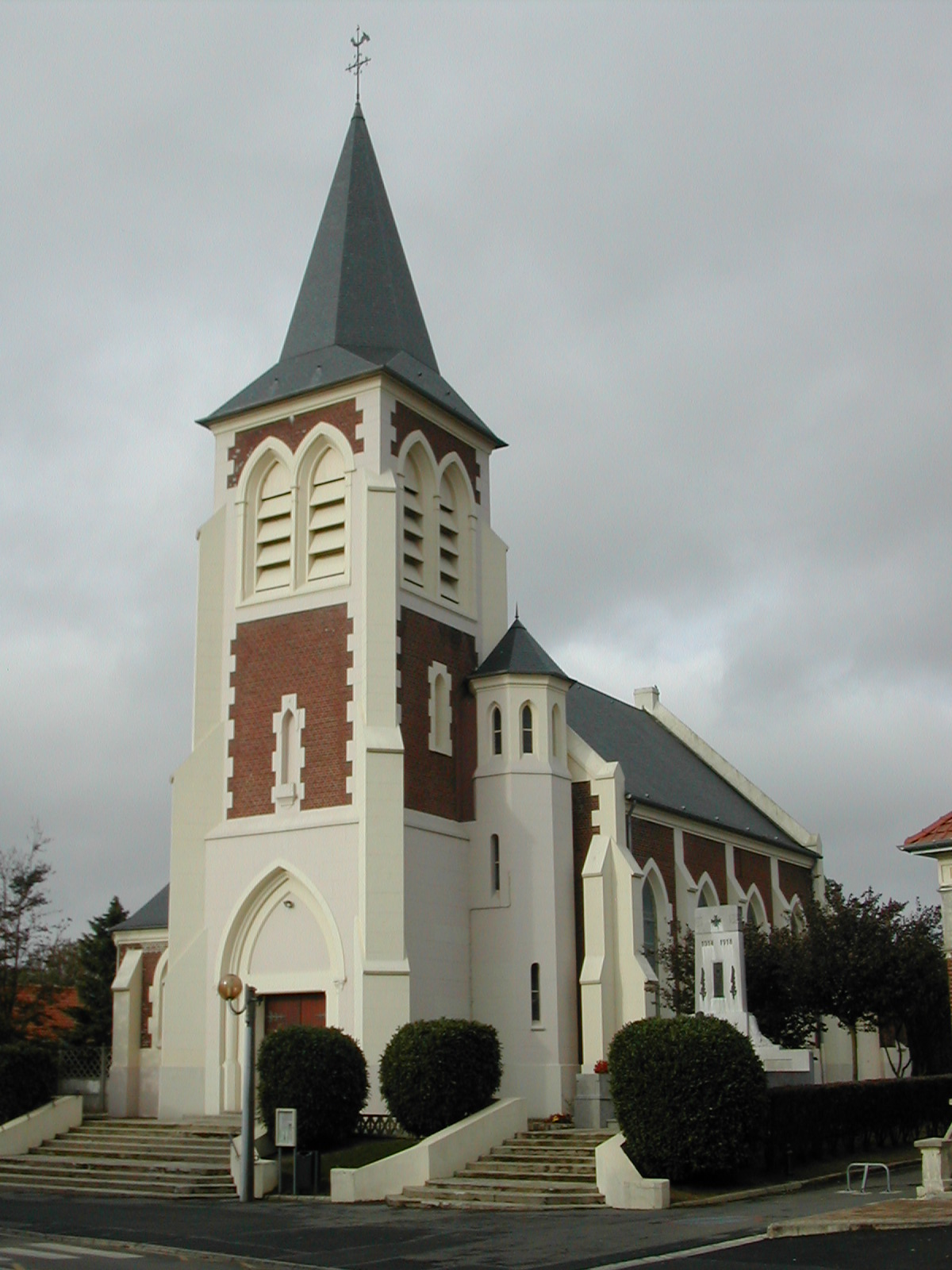
- The church of Mercatel

- Coat of arms
- Location of Mercatel
- Location within France Location within Hauts-de-France
- Coordinates: 50°14′10″N 2°47′47″E
- Country: France
- Region: Hauts-de-France
- Department: Pas-de-Calais
- Arrondissement: Arras
- Canton: Arras-3
- Intercommunality: CU d'Arras

Government
  - Mayor (2020–2026): Sylvain Roy
- Area^{1}: 5.76 km^{2} (2.22 sq mi)
- Elevation: 88 m (289 ft)
- Highest elevation: 99 m (325 ft)
- Lowest elevation: 71 m (233 ft)
- Population (2023): 730
  - Density: 130/km^{2} (330/sq mi)
- Time zone: UTC+01:00 (CET)
  - Summer (DST): UTC+02:00 (CEST)
- INSEE/Postal code: 62568 /62217
- ^{1} French Land Register data, which excludes lakes, ponds, glaciers > 1 km^{2} (0.386 sq mi or 247 acres) and river estuaries.

Mercatel (French pronunciation: [mɛʁkatɛl]) is a commune in the Pas-de-Calais department in the Hauts-de-France region of France 4 miles (6 km) south of Arras.

== Population ==
Historical population
Year	Pop.	±% p.a.
1968	446	—
1975	526	+2.38%
1982	515	−0.30%
1990	546	+0.73%
1999	572	+0.52%
2007	628	+1.17%
2012	611	−0.55%
2017	697	+2.67%
2023	730	+0.77%
Source: INSEE

== See also ==
- Communes of the Pas-de-Calais department
