= Tilloy-lès-Mofflaines =

- Commune
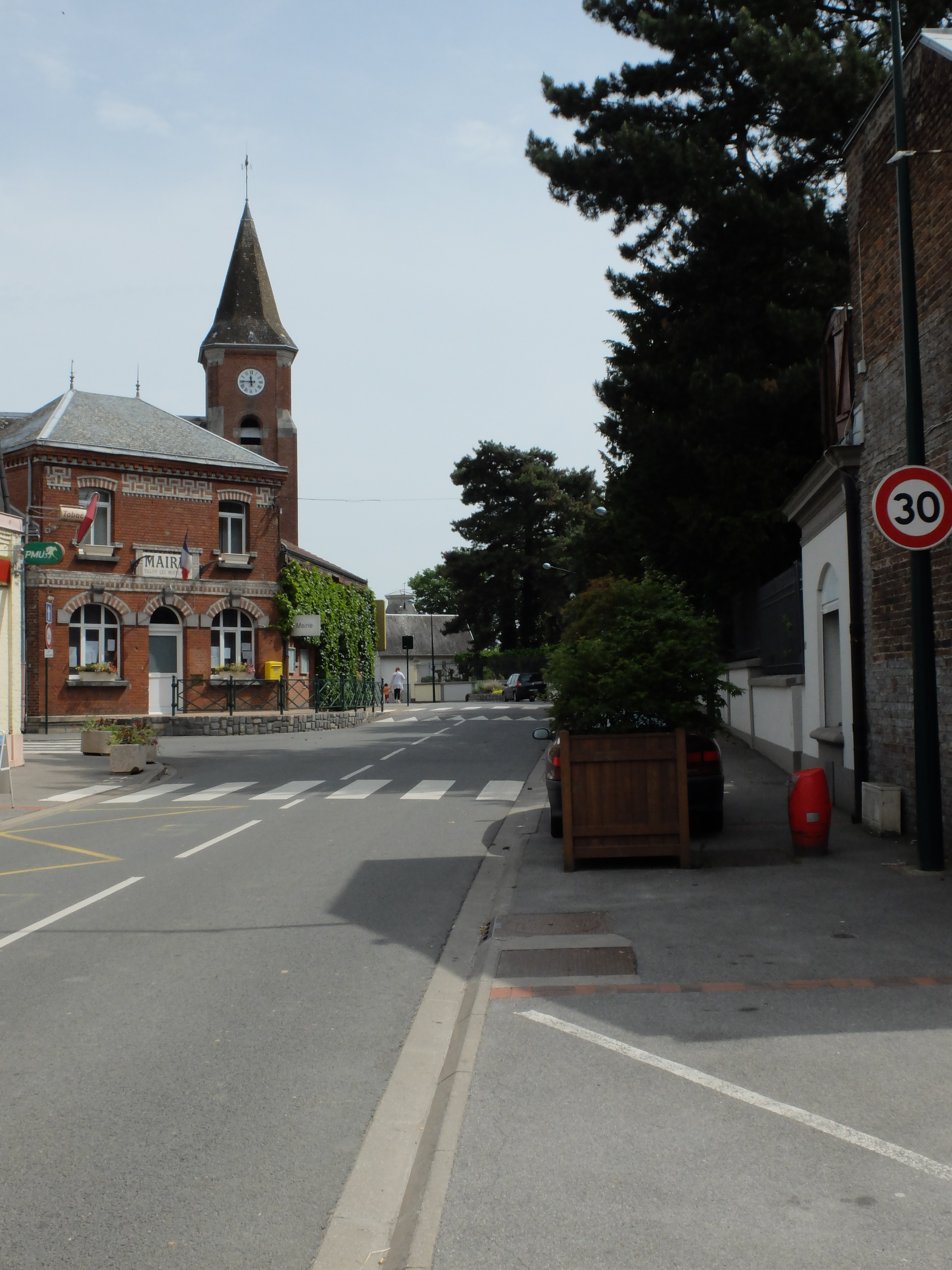
- The centre of Tilloy-lès-Mofflaines

- Coat of arms
- Location of Tilloy-lès-Mofflaines
- Location within France Location within Hauts-de-France
- Coordinates: 50°16′38″N 2°49′02″E
- Country: France
- Region: Hauts-de-France
- Department: Pas-de-Calais
- Arrondissement: Arras
- Canton: Arras-3
- Intercommunality: Arras

Government
  - Mayor (2020–2026): Didier Michel
- Area^{1}: 7.69 km^{2} (2.97 sq mi)
- Elevation: 84 m (276 ft)
- Highest elevation: 102 m (335 ft)
- Lowest elevation: 54 m (177 ft)
- Population (2023): 1,616
  - Density: 210/km^{2} (544/sq mi)
- Time zone: UTC+01:00 (CET)
  - Summer (DST): UTC+02:00 (CEST)
- INSEE/Postal code: 62817 /62217
- ^{1} French Land Register data, which excludes lakes, ponds, glaciers > 1 km^{2} (0.386 sq mi or 247 acres) and river estuaries.

Tilloy-lès-Mofflaines (French pronunciation: [tilwa lɛ mɔflɛn]) is a commune in the Pas-de-Calais department in the Hauts-de-France region of France southeast of Arras.

== Population ==
Historical population
Year	Pop.	±% p.a.
1968	773	—
1975	744	−0.54%
1982	806	+1.15%
1990	1,309	+6.25%
1999	1,329	+0.17%
2007	1,380	+0.47%
2012	1,424	+0.63%
2017	1,434	+0.14%
2023	1,616	+2.01%
Source: INSEE

== See also ==
- Communes of the Pas-de-Calais department
