= Neuville-Vitasse =

- Commune
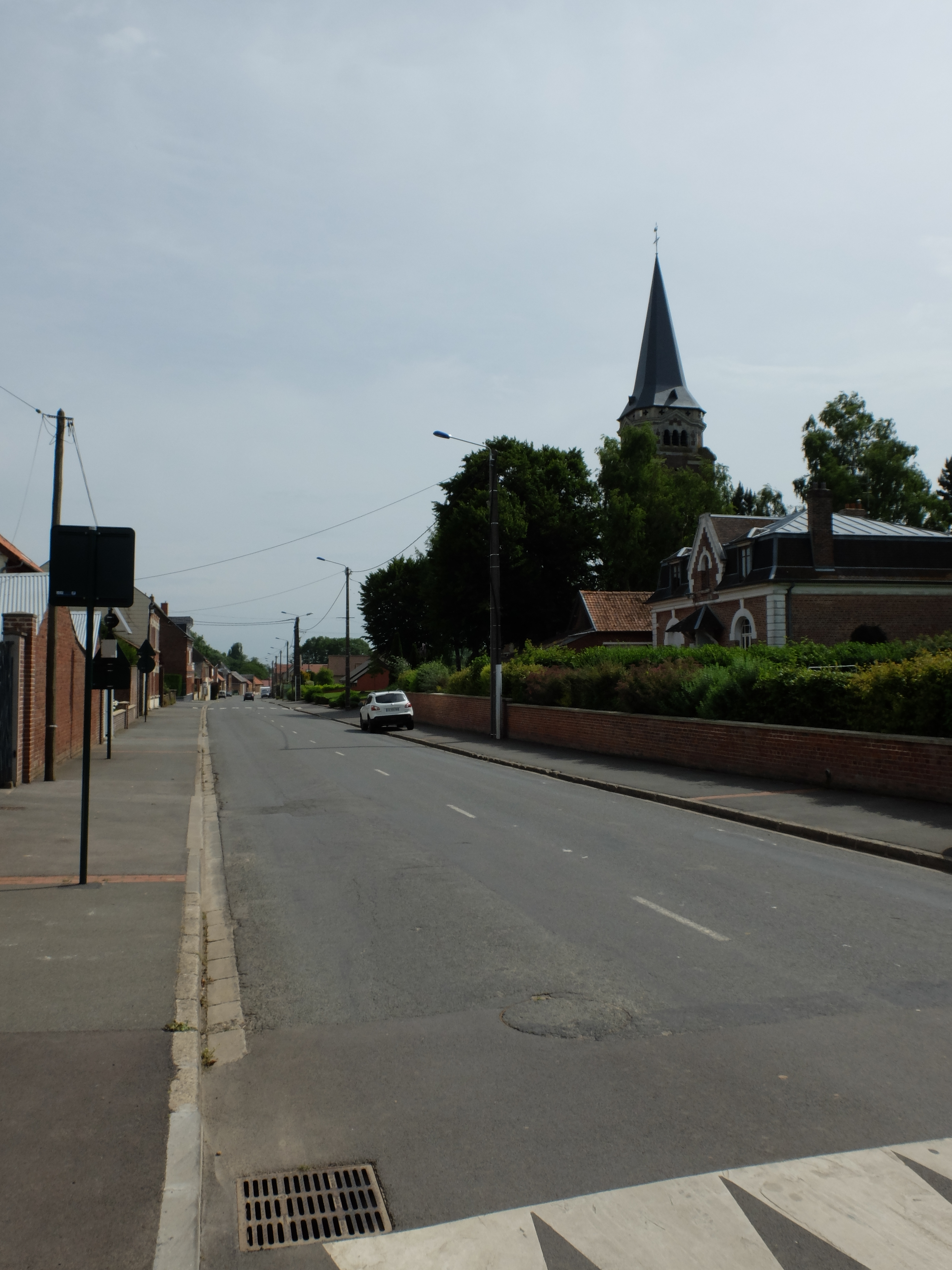
- The main road of Neuville-Vitasse

- Coat of arms
- Location of Neuville-Vitasse
- Location within France Location within Hauts-de-France
- Coordinates: 50°14′53″N 2°49′16″E
- Country: France
- Region: Hauts-de-France
- Department: Pas-de-Calais
- Arrondissement: Arras
- Canton: Arras-3
- Intercommunality: CU d'Arras

Government
  - Mayor (2020–2026): Jean-Claude Levis
- Area^{1}: 6.98 km^{2} (2.69 sq mi)
- Elevation: 82 m (269 ft)
- Highest elevation: 101 m (331 ft)
- Lowest elevation: 65 m (213 ft)
- Population (2023): 481
  - Density: 68.9/km^{2} (178/sq mi)
- Time zone: UTC+01:00 (CET)
  - Summer (DST): UTC+02:00 (CEST)
- INSEE/Postal code: 62611 /62217
- ^{1} French Land Register data, which excludes lakes, ponds, glaciers > 1 km^{2} (0.386 sq mi or 247 acres) and river estuaries.

Neuville-Vitasse (French pronunciation: [nøvil vitas]) is a commune in the Pas-de-Calais department in the Hauts-de-France region of France 4 miles (6 km) southeast of Arras.

== Population ==
Historical population
Year	Pop.	±% p.a.
1968	374	—
1975	400	+0.96%
1982	433	+1.14%
1990	496	+1.71%
1999	503	+0.16%
2007	477	−0.66%
2012	521	+1.78%
2017	505	−0.62%
2023	481	−0.81%
Source: INSEE

== See also ==
- Communes of the Pas-de-Calais department
