= Héninel =

- Commune
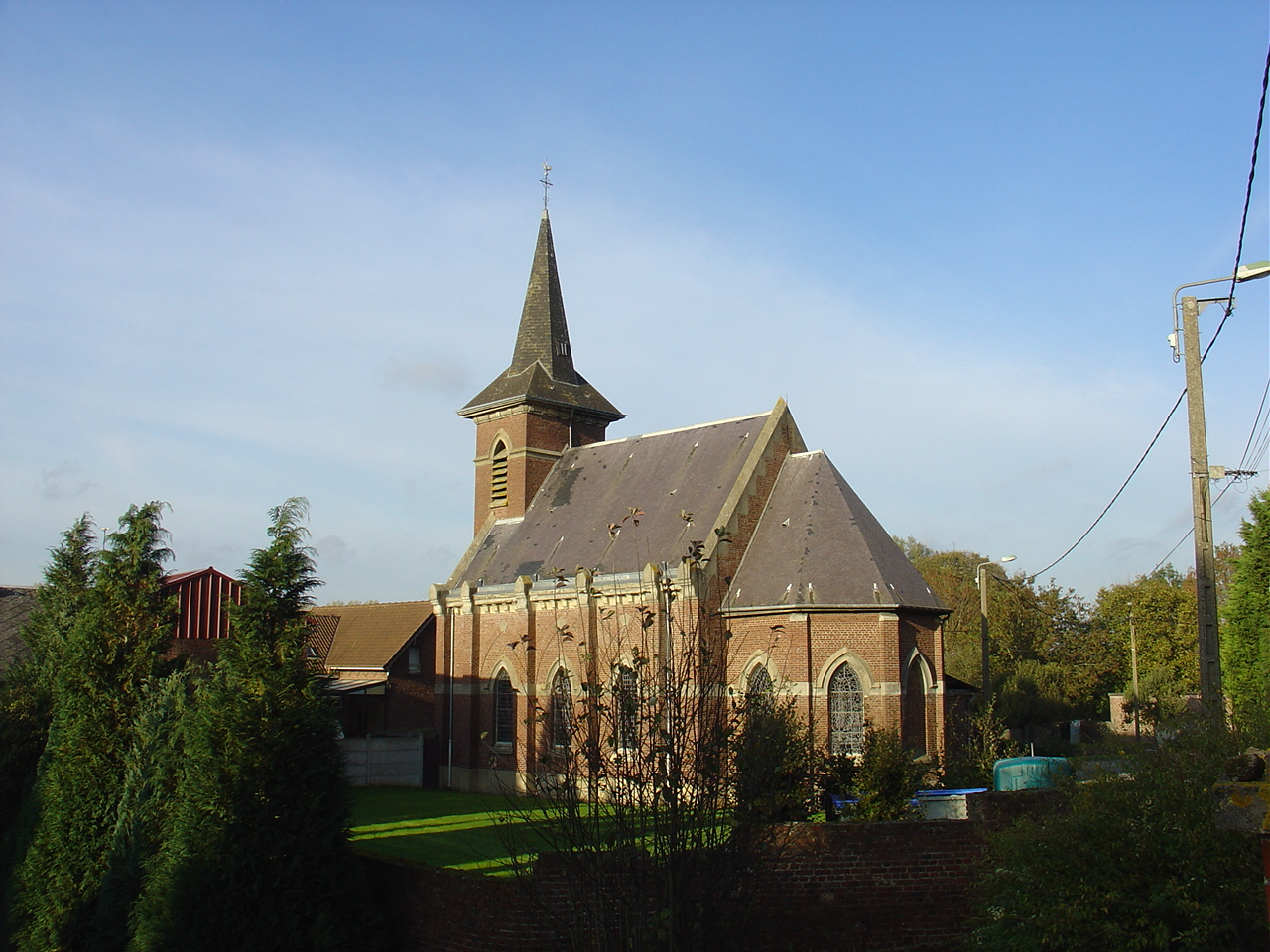
- The church of Héninel

- Coat of arms
- Location of Héninel
- Location within France Location within Hauts-de-France
- Coordinates: 50°14′20″N 2°51′52″E
- Country: France
- Region: Hauts-de-France
- Department: Pas-de-Calais
- Arrondissement: Arras
- Canton: Arras-3
- Intercommunality: CU Arras

Government
  - Mayor (2020–2026): Claude Lecornet
- Area^{1}: 5.32 km^{2} (2.05 sq mi)
- Elevation: 65 m (213 ft)
- Highest elevation: 108 m (354 ft)
- Lowest elevation: 58 m (190 ft)
- Population (2023): 187
  - Density: 35.2/km^{2} (91.0/sq mi)
- Time zone: UTC+01:00 (CET)
  - Summer (DST): UTC+02:00 (CEST)
- INSEE/Postal code: 62426 /62128
- ^{1} French Land Register data, which excludes lakes, ponds, glaciers > 1 km^{2} (0.386 sq mi or 247 acres) and river estuaries.

Héninel (French pronunciation: [eninɛl]) is a commune in the Pas-de-Calais department in the Hauts-de-France region of France.

== Geography ==
A small farming village situated 6 miles (10 km) southeast of Arras, on the D33 road and just yards away from the A1 autoroute.

== Population ==
Historical population
Year	Pop.	±% p.a.
1968	186	—
1975	165	−1.70%
1982	197	+2.56%
1990	238	+2.39%
1999	195	−2.19%
2007	209	+0.87%
2012	195	−1.38%
2017	177	−1.92%
2023	187	+0.92%
Source: INSEE

== Places of interest ==
- The church of St. Germain, rebuilt, as was most of the village, after the First World War.
- The Commonwealth War Graves Commission cemeteries.
- Traces of an old castle.

== See also ==
- Communes of the Pas-de-Calais department
