= Mory, Pas-de-Calais =

Mory
- Commune
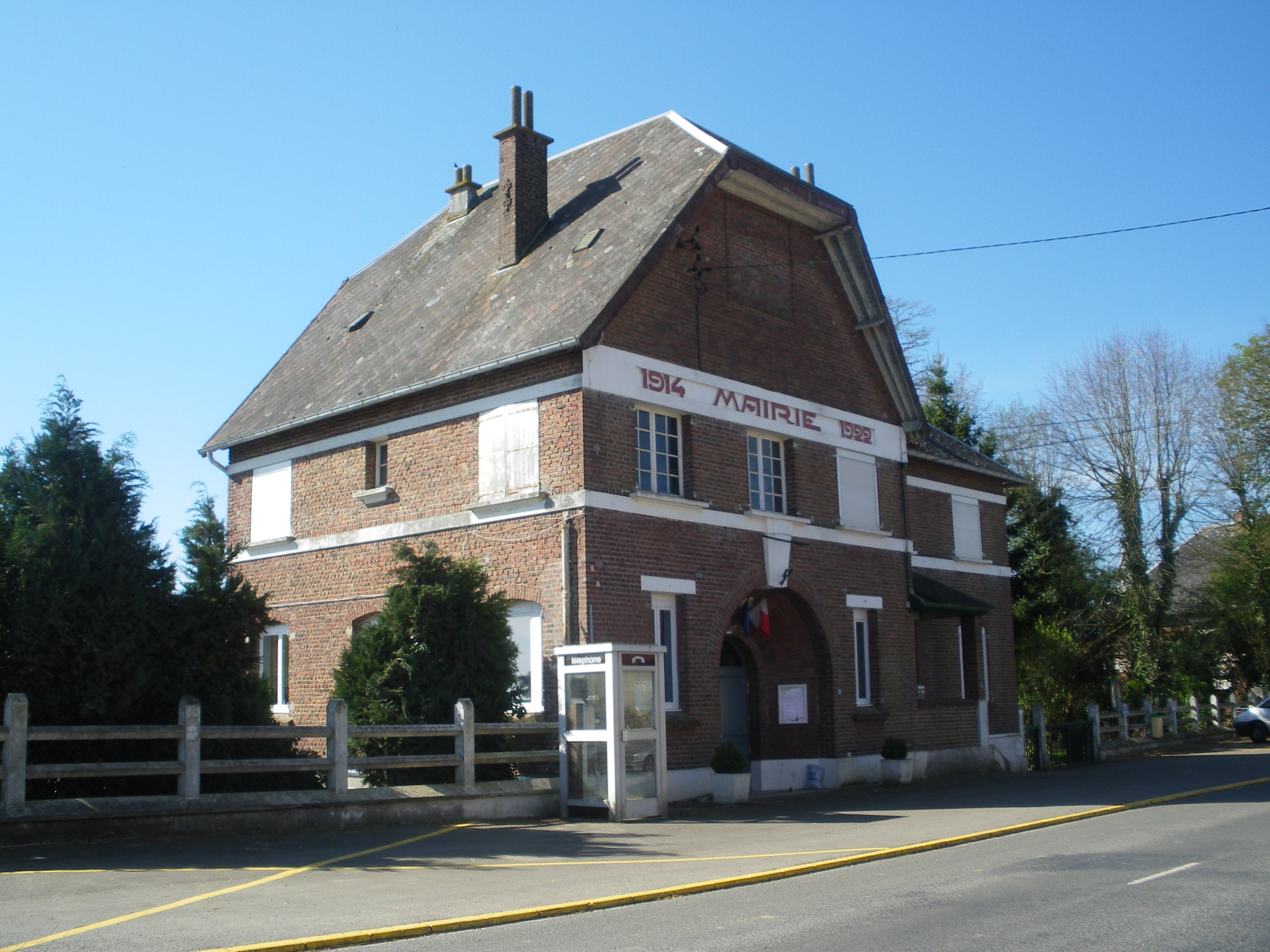
- The town hall of Mory

- Coat of arms
- Location of Mory
- Location within France Location within Hauts-de-France
- Coordinates: 50°09′25″N 2°51′12″E
- Country: France
- Region: Hauts-de-France
- Department: Pas-de-Calais
- Arrondissement: Arras
- Canton: Bapaume
- Intercommunality: CC Sud-Artois

Government
  - Mayor (2020–2026): Sylvie Barbier
- Area^{1}: 7.39 km^{2} (2.85 sq mi)
- Elevation: 90 m (300 ft)
- Highest elevation: 121 m (397 ft)
- Lowest elevation: 87 m (285 ft)
- Population (2023): 299
  - Density: 40.5/km^{2} (105/sq mi)
- Time zone: UTC+01:00 (CET)
  - Summer (DST): UTC+02:00 (CEST)
- INSEE/Postal code: 62594 /62159
- ^{1} French Land Register data, which excludes lakes, ponds, glaciers > 1 km^{2} (0.386 sq mi or 247 acres) and river estuaries.

Mory (French pronunciation: [mɔʁi]) is a commune in the Pas-de-Calais department in the Hauts-de-France region of France 13 miles (21 km) south of Arras.

== Population ==
Historical population
Year	Pop.	±% p.a.
1968	353	—
1975	315	−1.61%
1982	314	−0.05%
1990	319	+0.20%
1999	339	+0.68%
2007	342	+0.11%
2012	332	−0.59%
2017	309	−1.43%
2023	299	−0.55%
Source: INSEE

== See also ==
- Communes of the Pas-de-Calais department
