= Wancourt =

- Commune
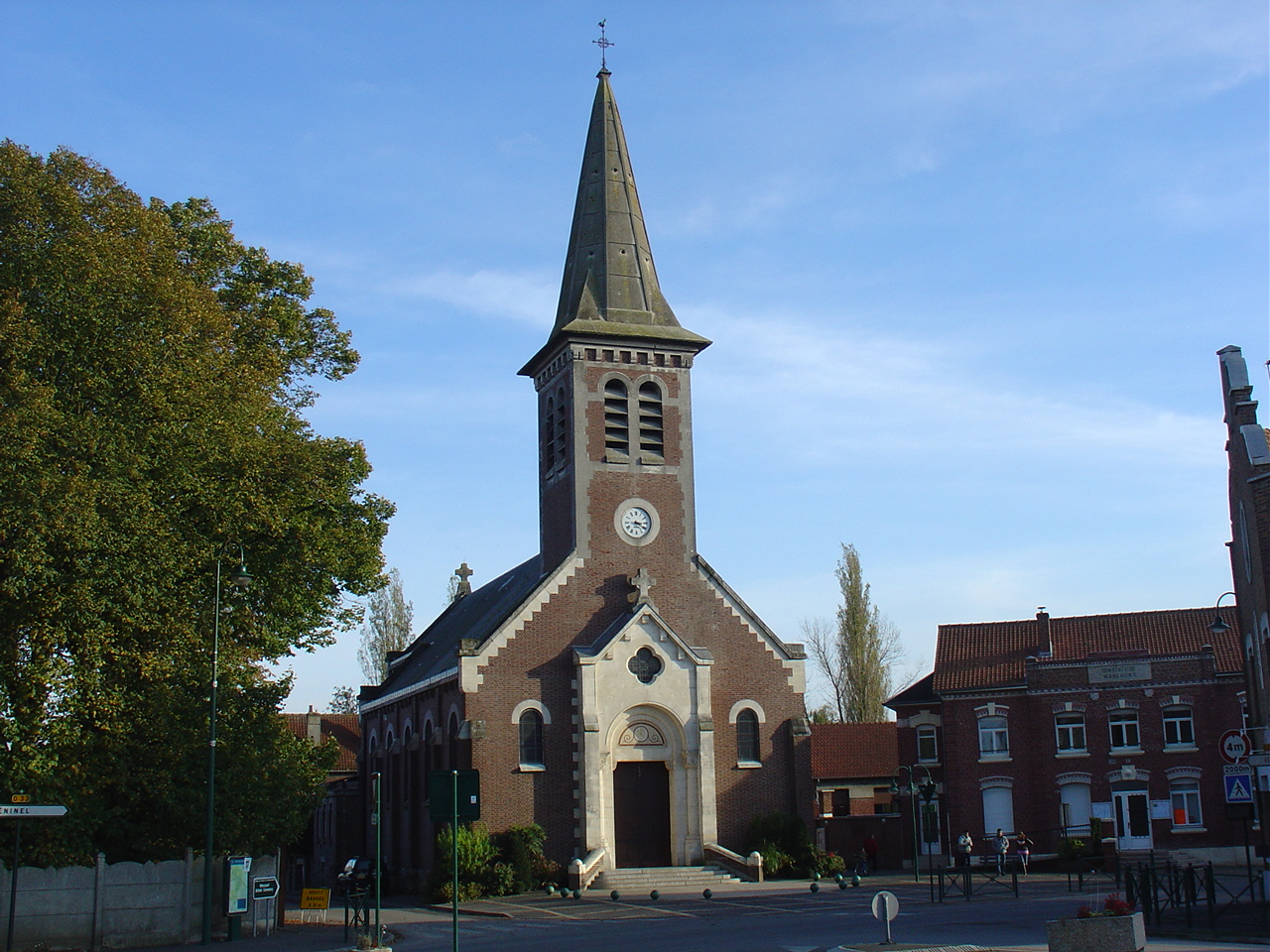
- The church of Wancourt
- Location of Wancourt
- Location within France Location within Hauts-de-France
- Coordinates: 50°14′54″N 2°52′18″E
- Country: France
- Region: Hauts-de-France
- Department: Pas-de-Calais
- Arrondissement: Arras
- Canton: Arras-3
- Intercommunality: Arras

Government
  - Mayor (2020–2026): Éric Duflot
- Area^{1}: 8.9 km^{2} (3.4 sq mi)
- Elevation: 61 m (200 ft)
- Highest elevation: 101 m (331 ft)
- Lowest elevation: 56 m (184 ft)
- Population (2023): 626
  - Density: 70/km^{2} (180/sq mi)
- Time zone: UTC+01:00 (CET)
  - Summer (DST): UTC+02:00 (CEST)
- INSEE/Postal code: 62873 /62128
- ^{1} French Land Register data, which excludes lakes, ponds, glaciers > 1 km^{2} (0.386 sq mi or 247 acres) and river estuaries.

Wancourt (French pronunciation: [wɑ̃kuʁ]) is a commune in the Pas-de-Calais department in the Hauts-de-France region of France about 5 miles (8.0 km) southeast of Arras.

== Population ==
Historical population
Year	Pop.	±% p.a.
1968	399	—
1975	420	+0.74%
1982	431	+0.37%
1990	547	+3.02%
1999	587	+0.79%
2007	598	+0.23%
2012	671	+2.33%
2017	649	−0.66%
2023	626	−0.60%
Source: INSEE

== See also ==
- Communes of the Pas-de-Calais department
