= Boisleux-Saint-Marc =

- Commune
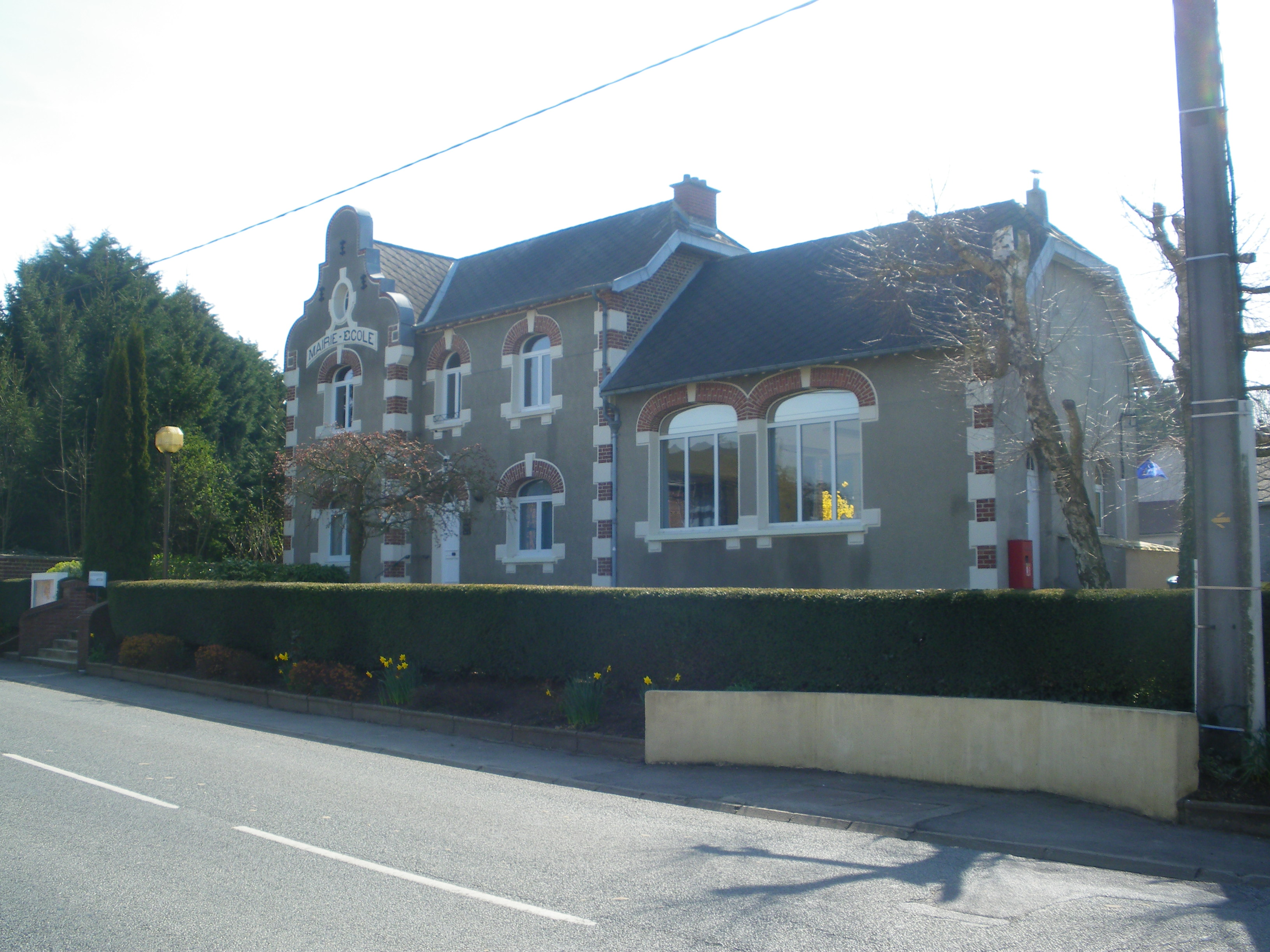
- The town hall of Boisleux-Saint-Marc

- Coat of arms
- Location of Boisleux-Saint-Marc
- Location within France Location within Hauts-de-France
- Coordinates: 50°12′45″N 2°47′59″E
- Country: France
- Region: Hauts-de-France
- Department: Pas-de-Calais
- Arrondissement: Arras
- Canton: Arras-3
- Intercommunality: CU Arras

Government
  - Mayor (2020–2026): Stéphane Leignez
- Area^{1}: 3.38 km^{2} (1.31 sq mi)
- Elevation: 90 m (300 ft)
- Highest elevation: 99 m (325 ft)
- Lowest elevation: 69 m (226 ft)
- Population (2023): 254
  - Density: 75.1/km^{2} (195/sq mi)
- Time zone: UTC+01:00 (CET)
  - Summer (DST): UTC+02:00 (CEST)
- INSEE/Postal code: 62152 /62175
- ^{1} French Land Register data, which excludes lakes, ponds, glaciers > 1 km^{2} (0.386 sq mi or 247 acres) and river estuaries.

Boisleux-Saint-Marc (French pronunciation: [bwalø sɛ̃ maʁk]; Picard: Bouilleul-Saint-Marc) is a commune in the Pas-de-Calais department in the Hauts-de-France region in northern France.

== Geography ==
A farming village located 7 miles (11 km) south of Arras on the D35 road.

== Population ==
Historical population
| Year | Pop. | ±% p.a. |
|---|---|---|
| 1968 | 99 | — |
| 1975 | 87 | −1.83% |
| 1982 | 96 | +1.42% |
| 1990 | 164 | +6.92% |
| 1999 | 208 | +2.68% |
| 2007 | 190 | −1.13% |
| 2012 | 255 | +6.06% |
| 2017 | 251 | −0.32% |
| 2023 | 254 | +0.20% |
Source: INSEE

== Sights ==
- The church of St. Médard, rebuilt after the destruction of the village during World War I.

== See also ==
- Communes of the Pas-de-Calais department
