= Boisleux-au-Mont =

- Commune
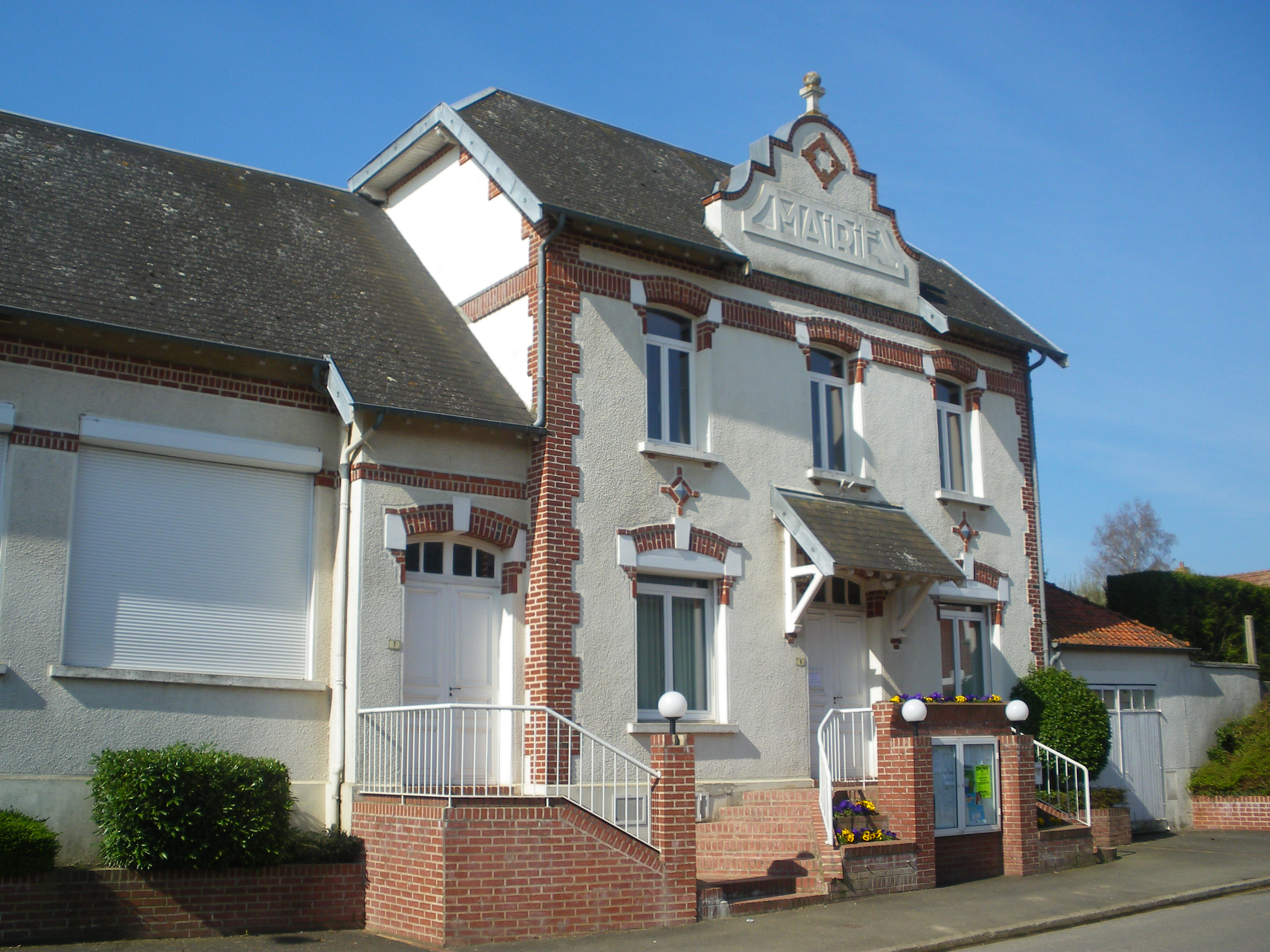
- The town hall of Boisleux-au-Mont

- Coat of arms
- Location of Boisleux-au-Mont
- Location within France Location within Hauts-de-France
- Coordinates: 50°12′39″N 2°46′57″E
- Country: France
- Region: Hauts-de-France
- Department: Pas-de-Calais
- Arrondissement: Arras
- Canton: Arras-3
- Intercommunality: CU Arras

Government
  - Mayor (2020–2026): Jean-Marie Distinguin
- Area^{1}: 4.66 km^{2} (1.80 sq mi)
- Elevation: 88 m (289 ft)
- Highest elevation: 108 m (354 ft)
- Lowest elevation: 73 m (240 ft)
- Population (2023): 514
  - Density: 110/km^{2} (286/sq mi)
- Time zone: UTC+01:00 (CET)
  - Summer (DST): UTC+02:00 (CEST)
- INSEE/Postal code: 62151 /62175
- ^{1} French Land Register data, which excludes lakes, ponds, glaciers > 1 km^{2} (0.386 sq mi or 247 acres) and river estuaries.

Boisleux-au-Mont (French pronunciation: [bwalø o mɔ̃]) is a commune in the Pas-de-Calais department in the Hauts-de-France region in northern France.

== Geography ==
A farming village located 6 miles (10 km) south of Arras at the junction of the D35 and D36 roads.

== Population ==
Historical population
Year	Pop.	±% p.a.
1968	395	—
1975	361	−1.28%
1982	409	+1.80%
1990	449	+1.17%
1999	407	−1.09%
2007	495	+2.48%
2012	503	+0.32%
2017	517	+0.55%
2023	514	−0.10%
Source: INSEE

== Sights ==
- The church of St. Vaast, rebuilt after the destruction of the village during World War I.
- The Commonwealth War Graves Commission cemetery.

== See also ==
- Communes of the Pas-de-Calais department
