= Croisilles, Pas-de-Calais =

Croisilles
- Commune
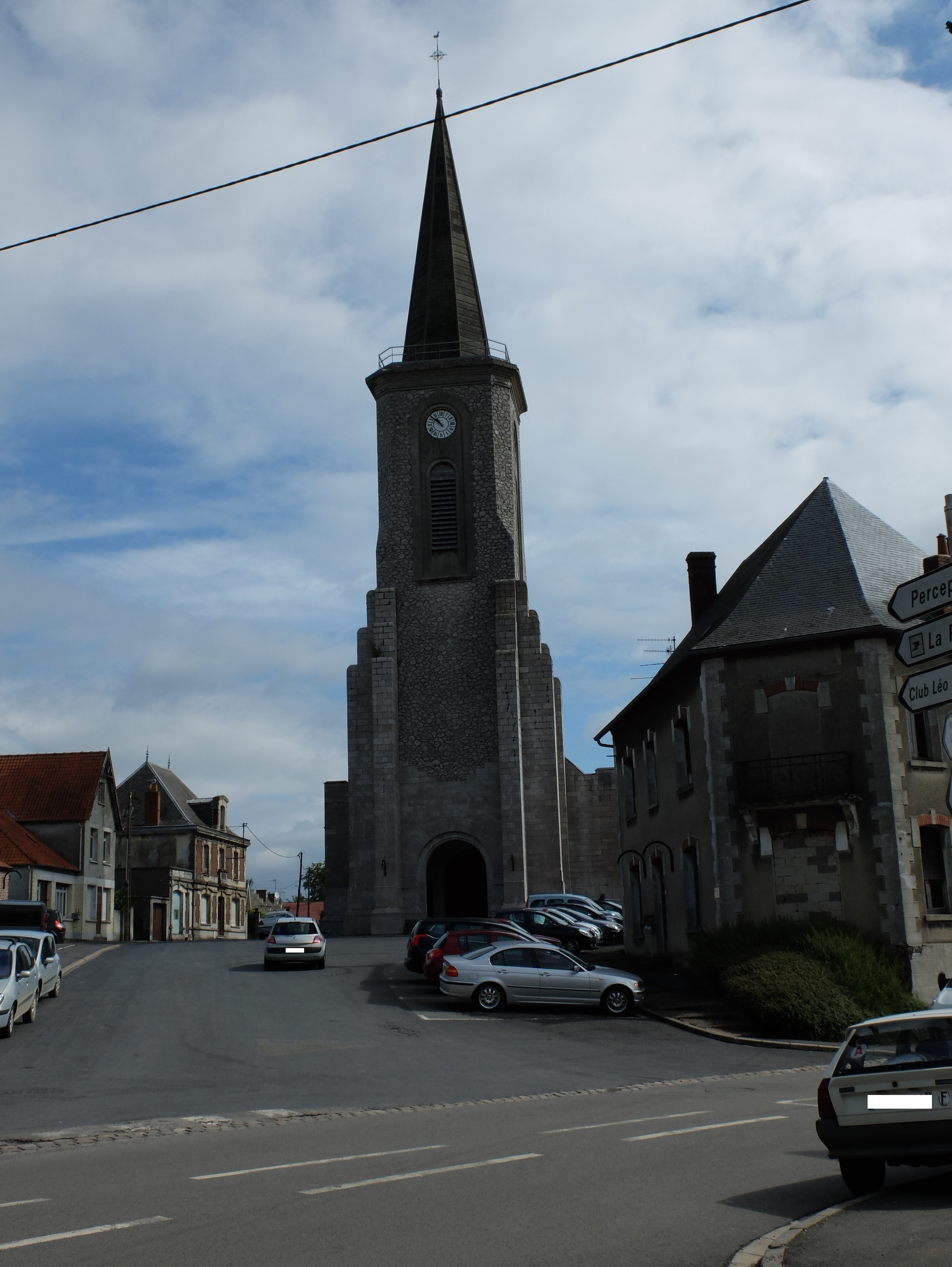
- The church of Croisilles

- Coat of arms
- Location of Croisilles
- Location within France Location within Hauts-de-France
- Coordinates: 50°12′01″N 2°52′51″E
- Country: France
- Region: Hauts-de-France
- Department: Pas-de-Calais
- Arrondissement: Arras
- Canton: Bapaume
- Intercommunality: CC Sud-Artois

Government
  - Mayor (2020–2026): Gérard Dué
- Area^{1}: 11.58 km^{2} (4.47 sq mi)
- Elevation: 79 m (259 ft)
- Highest elevation: 114 m (374 ft)
- Lowest elevation: 64 m (210 ft)
- Population (2023): 1,939
  - Density: 167.4/km^{2} (433.7/sq mi)
- Time zone: UTC+01:00 (CET)
  - Summer (DST): UTC+02:00 (CEST)
- INSEE/Postal code: 62259 /62128
- ^{1} French Land Register data, which excludes lakes, ponds, glaciers > 1 km^{2} (0.386 sq mi or 247 acres) and river estuaries.

Croisilles (French pronunciation: [kʁwazˈij]) is a village and commune in the Pas-de-Calais department of the Hauts-de-France region of France.

== Geography ==
A small farming village located 8 miles (13 km) south of Arras at the junction of the D5 and D9 roads. Many of the residents commute to work in Arras or the town of Bapaume to the south.

The village is bypassed to the north and east by the LGV Nord high speed line and the A1 Autoroute. The junction with the Angy branch of the LGV Nord, in the direction of Arras, is located to the north of Croisilles.

In addition to its church, the village has two bars, a supermarket (including petrol station), a pharmacy, a post office and a small DIY store, which is operated by the local farmers' co-operative. There is also a village stadium (including indoor sports hall), an ecole maternale (kindergarten) and an ecole primaire (primary school), which is attached to the mairie (town hall).

== Population ==
Historical population
| Year | Pop. | ±% p.a. |
|---|---|---|
| 1968 | 711 | — |
| 1975 | 825 | +2.15% |
| 1982 | 1,062 | +3.67% |
| 1990 | 1,180 | +1.33% |
| 1999 | 1,165 | −0.14% |
| 2007 | 1,288 | +1.26% |
| 2012 | 1,568 | +4.01% |
| 2017 | 1,929 | +4.23% |
| 2023 | 1,939 | +0.09% |
Source: INSEE

== Places of interest ==
- The church of St.Martin, rebuilt, as was most of the town, after World War I.
- The two Commonwealth War Graves Commission cemeteries.
- Some remains of an 11th-century castle.

== See also ==
- Communes of the Pas-de-Calais department
