= Boyelles =

- Commune
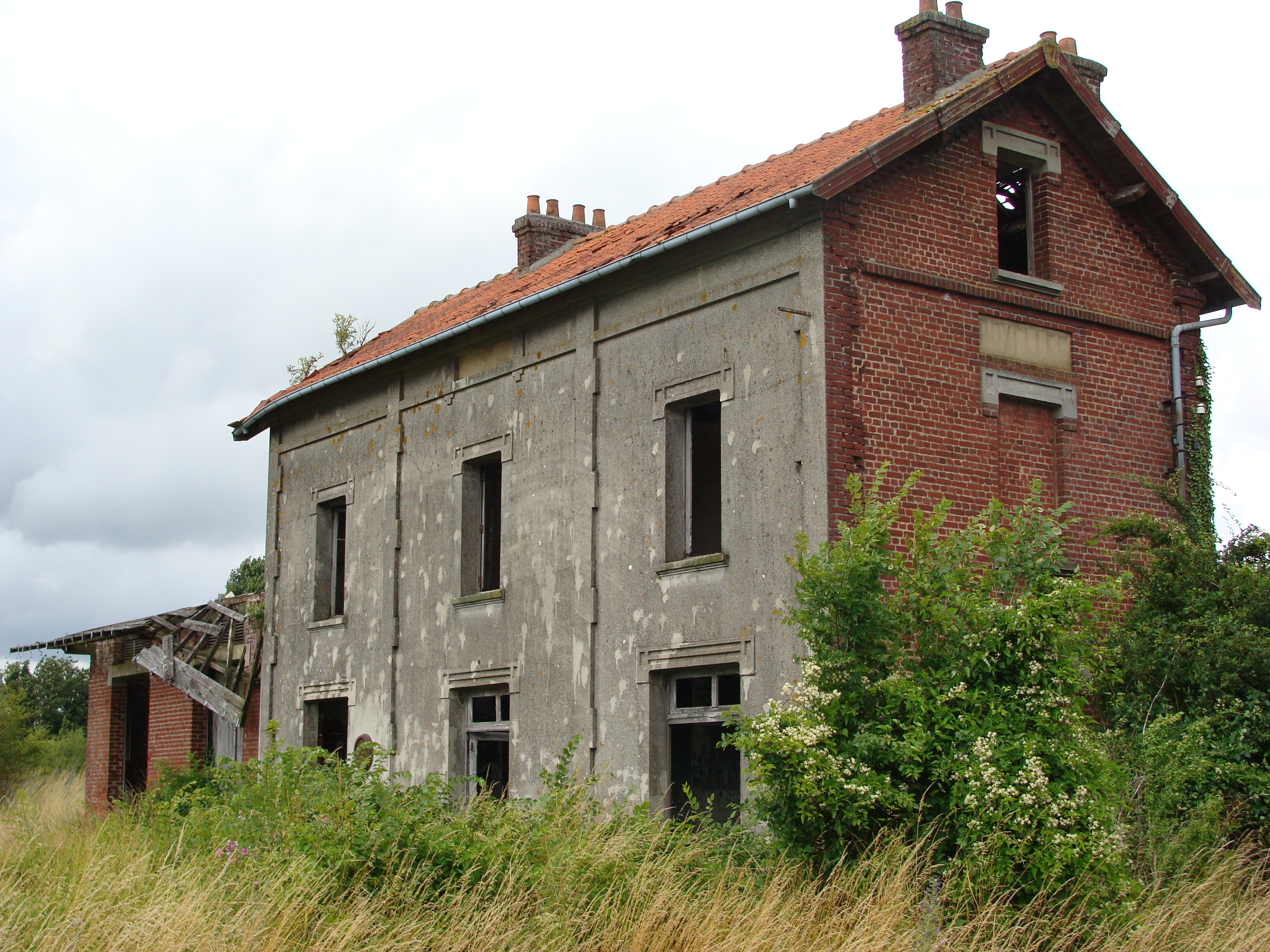
- The old railway station

- Coat of arms
- Location of Boyelles
- Location within France Location within Hauts-de-France
- Coordinates: 50°12′14″N 2°48′57″E
- Country: France
- Region: Hauts-de-France
- Department: Pas-de-Calais
- Arrondissement: Arras
- Canton: Arras-3
- Intercommunality: CU Arras

Government
  - Mayor (2022–2026): Charline Dumoulin
- Area^{1}: 4.25 km^{2} (1.64 sq mi)
- Elevation: 79 m (259 ft)
- Highest elevation: 107 m (351 ft)
- Lowest elevation: 70 m (230 ft)
- Population (2023): 366
  - Density: 86.1/km^{2} (223/sq mi)
- Time zone: UTC+01:00 (CET)
  - Summer (DST): UTC+02:00 (CEST)
- INSEE/Postal code: 62172 /62128
- ^{1} French Land Register data, which excludes lakes, ponds, glaciers > 1 km^{2} (0.386 sq mi or 247 acres) and river estuaries.

Boyelles (French pronunciation: [bwajɛl]; Picard: Böyelle) is a commune in the Pas-de-Calais department in the Hauts-de-France region in northern France.

== Geography ==
A farming village located 6 miles (11 km) south of Arras on the N17 road. A celebration of the potato takes place annually on the 1st Sunday in September.

== Population ==
Historical population
Year	Pop.	±% p.a.
1968	188	—
1975	160	−2.28%
1982	247	+6.40%
1990	246	−0.05%
1999	234	−0.55%
2007	234	+0.00%
2012	325	+6.79%
2017	358	+1.95%
2023	366	+0.37%
Source: INSEE

== Sights ==
- The church of St. Leger, dating from the twentieth century.
- The Commonwealth War Graves Commission cemetery.

== See also ==
- Communes of the Pas-de-Calais department
