= Boiry-Becquerelle =

- Commune
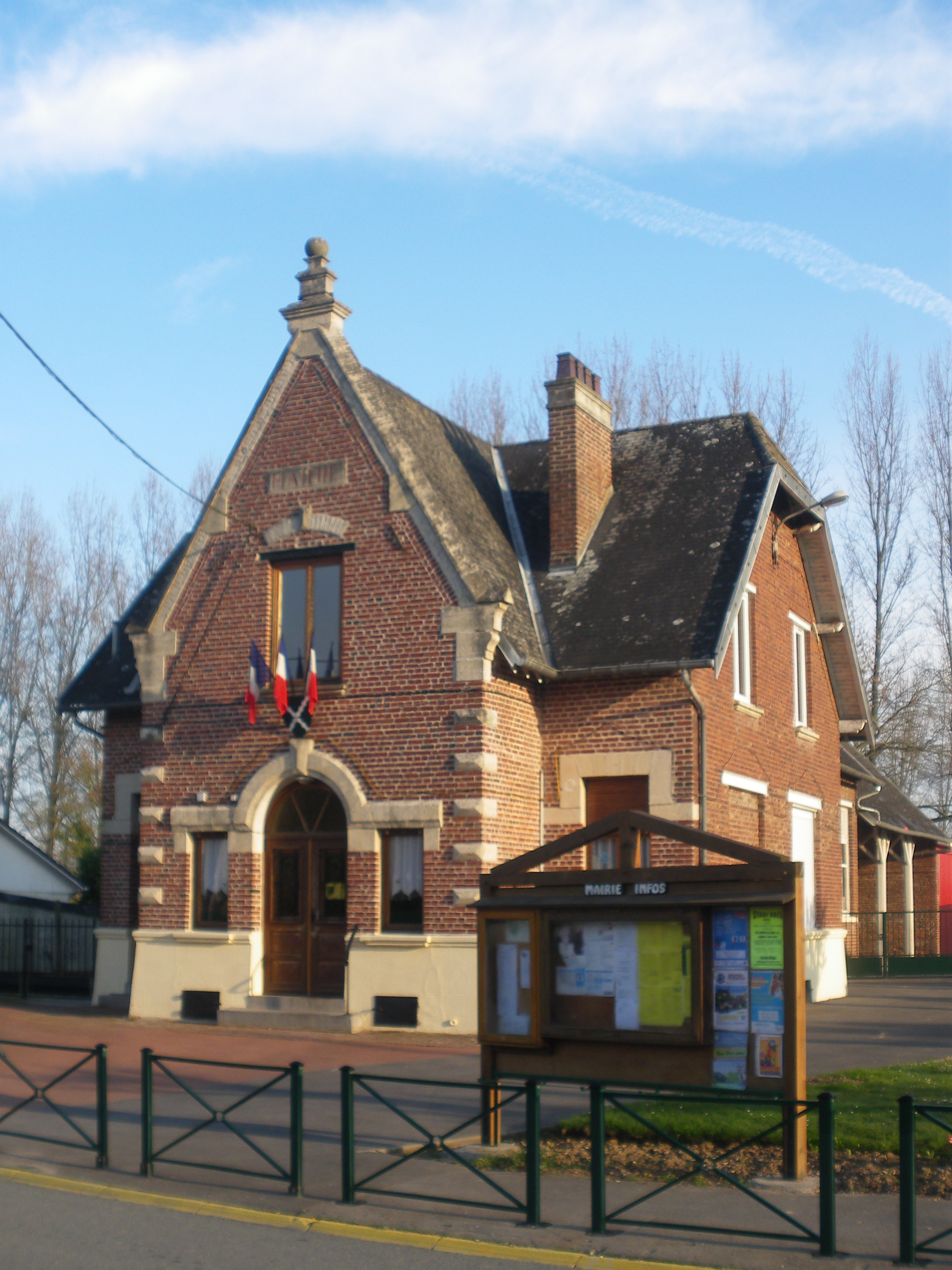
- The town hall of Boiry-Becquerelle

- Coat of arms
- Location of Boiry-Becquerelle
- Location within France Location within Hauts-de-France
- Coordinates: 50°12′51″N 2°48′57″E
- Country: France
- Region: Hauts-de-France
- Department: Pas-de-Calais
- Arrondissement: Arras
- Canton: Arras-3
- Intercommunality: CU Arras

Government
  - Mayor (2020–2026): Michel Dollet
- Area^{1}: 4.54 km^{2} (1.75 sq mi)
- Elevation: 78 m (256 ft)
- Highest elevation: 98 m (322 ft)
- Lowest elevation: 66 m (217 ft)
- Population (2023): 478
  - Density: 105/km^{2} (273/sq mi)
- Time zone: UTC+01:00 (CET)
  - Summer (DST): UTC+02:00 (CEST)
- INSEE/Postal code: 62144 /62128
- ^{1} French Land Register data, which excludes lakes, ponds, glaciers > 1 km^{2} (0.386 sq mi or 247 acres) and river estuaries.

Boiry-Becquerelle (French pronunciation: [bwaʁi bɛkʁɛl]) is a commune in the Pas-de-Calais department in the Hauts-de-France region in northern France.

== Geography ==
A farming village located 7 miles (11 km) south of Arras on the N17 junction with the D35 road.

== Population ==
Historical population
Year	Pop.	±% p.a.
1968	198	—
1975	213	+1.05%
1982	288	+4.40%
1990	381	+3.56%
1999	419	+1.06%
2007	409	−0.30%
2012	410	+0.05%
2017	447	+1.74%
2023	478	+1.12%
Source: INSEE

== Sights ==
- The church of St. Gervais, rebuilt after the destruction of the village during World War I.

== See also ==
- Communes of the Pas-de-Calais department
