= Guémappe =

- Commune
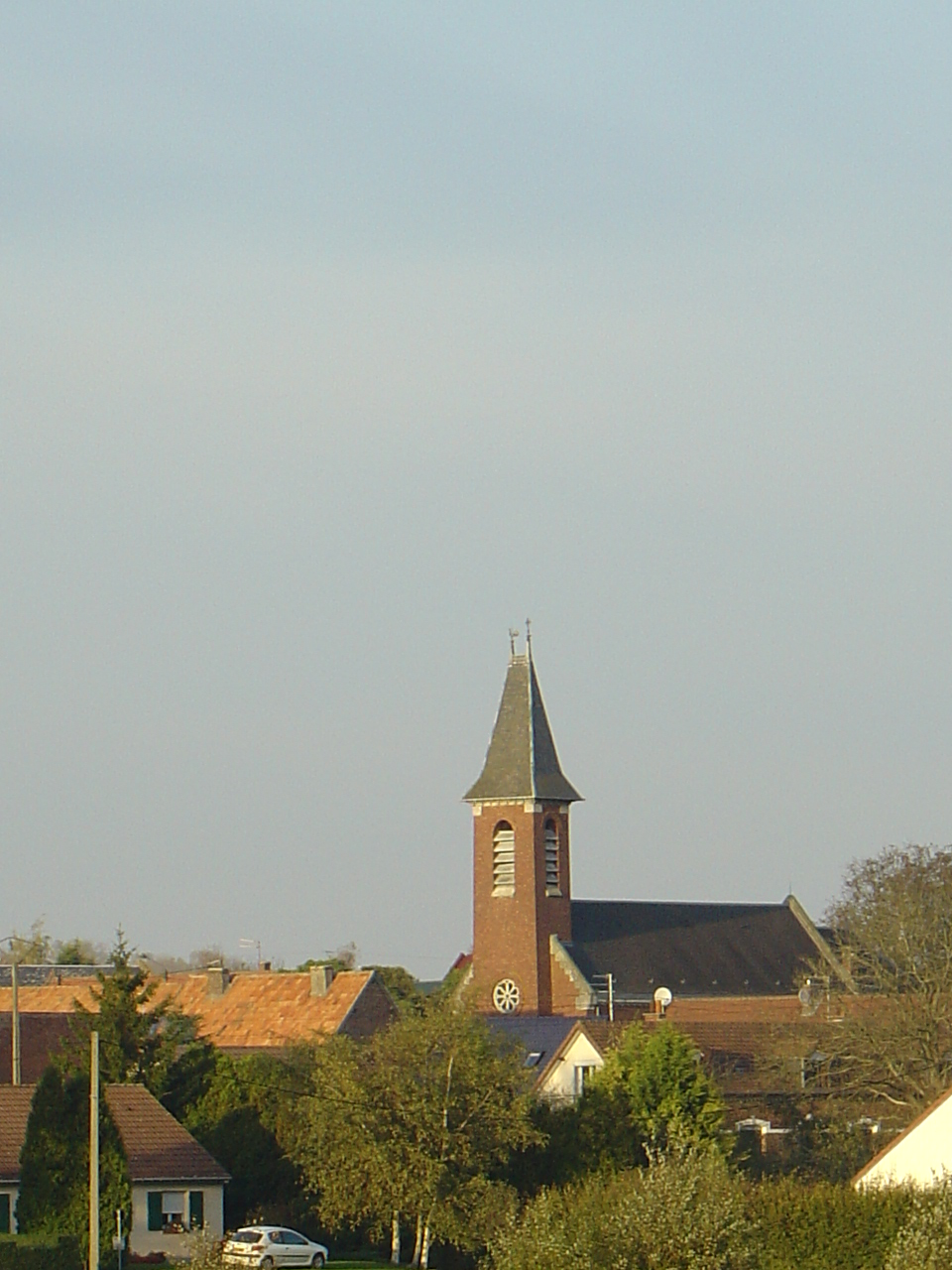
- The church of Guémappe

- Coat of arms
- Location of Guémappe
- Location within France Location within Hauts-de-France
- Coordinates: 50°15′16″N 2°53′24″E
- Country: France
- Region: Hauts-de-France
- Department: Pas-de-Calais
- Arrondissement: Arras
- Canton: Arras-3
- Intercommunality: CU Arras

Government
  - Mayor (2020–2026): Reynald Roche
- Area^{1}: 4.52 km^{2} (1.75 sq mi)
- Elevation: 66 m (217 ft)
- Highest elevation: 92 m (302 ft)
- Lowest elevation: 52 m (171 ft)
- Population (2023): 408
  - Density: 90.3/km^{2} (234/sq mi)
- Time zone: UTC+01:00 (CET)
  - Summer (DST): UTC+02:00 (CEST)
- INSEE/Postal code: 62392 /62128
- ^{1} French Land Register data, which excludes lakes, ponds, glaciers > 1 km^{2} (0.386 sq mi or 247 acres) and river estuaries.

Guémappe (French pronunciation: [ɡemap]) is a commune in the Pas-de-Calais department in the Hauts-de-France region of France.

== Geography ==
A small farming village situated 8 miles (13 km) southeast of Arras, at the junction of the D34 and the D38 roads.

== History ==
First noted as Gammapium in 1135. The seigneurie belonged to that of the Montmorency family at Wancourt. The village was the scene of heavy fighting in April 1917 and August 1918, during the First World War.

== Population ==
Historical population
Year	Pop.	±% p.a.
1968	250	—
1975	240	−0.58%
1982	248	+0.47%
1990	343	+4.14%
1999	392	+1.49%
2007	359	−1.09%
2012	358	−0.06%
2017	336	−1.26%
2023	408	+3.29%
Source: INSEE

== See also ==
- Communes of the Pas-de-Calais department
