= Saint-Martin-sur-Cojeul =

- Commune
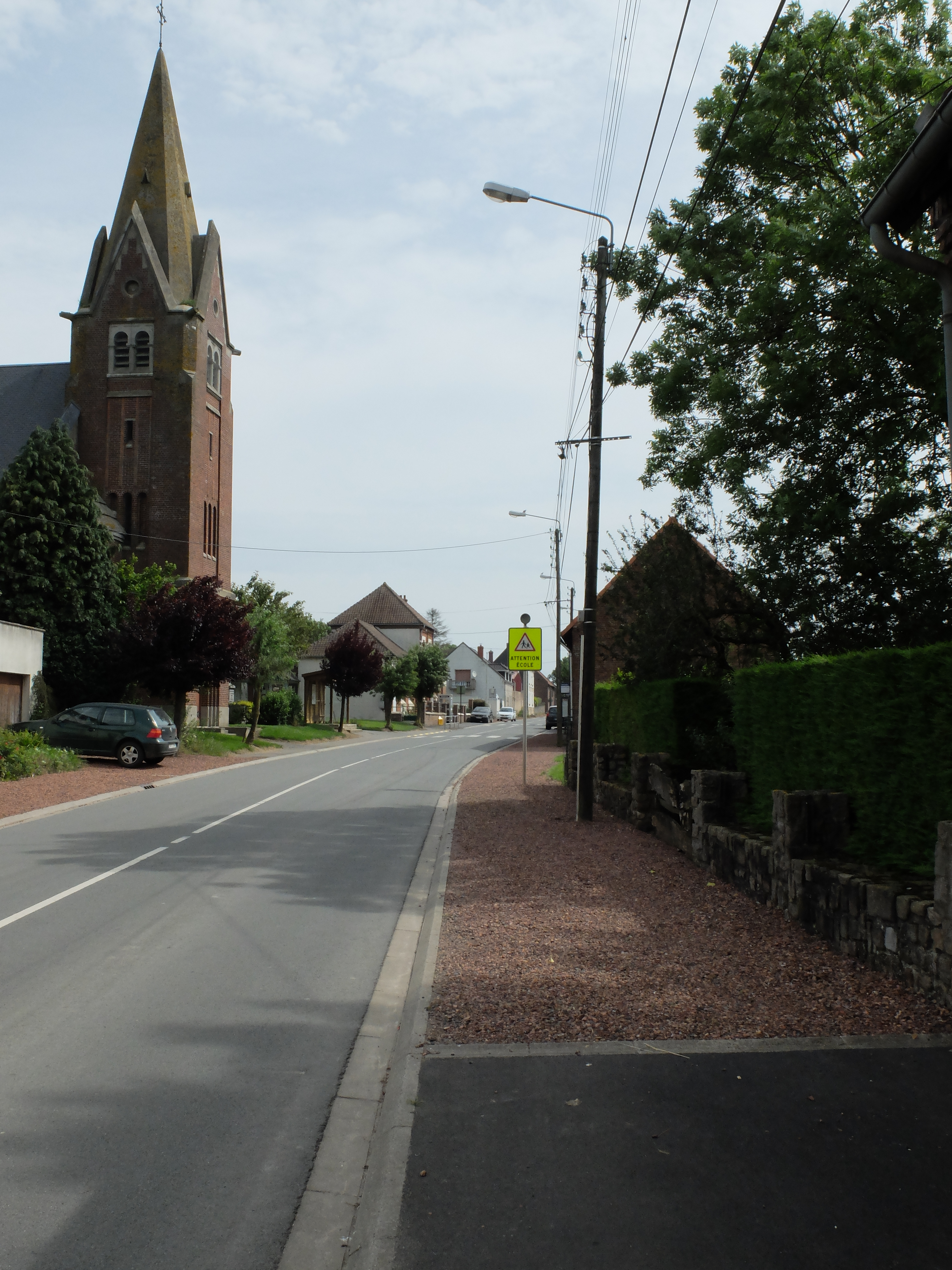
- The main road of Saint-Martin-sur-Cojeul

- Coat of arms
- Location of Saint-Martin-sur-Cojeul
- Location within France Location within Hauts-de-France
- Coordinates: 50°13′55″N 2°50′36″E
- Country: France
- Region: Hauts-de-France
- Department: Pas-de-Calais
- Arrondissement: Arras
- Canton: Arras-3
- Intercommunality: CU Arras

Government
  - Mayor (2020–2026): Dominique Delattre
- Area^{1}: 3.41 km^{2} (1.32 sq mi)
- Elevation: 64 m (210 ft)
- Highest elevation: 108 m (354 ft)
- Lowest elevation: 61 m (200 ft)
- Population (2023): 216
  - Density: 63.3/km^{2} (164/sq mi)
- Time zone: UTC+01:00 (CET)
  - Summer (DST): UTC+02:00 (CEST)
- INSEE/Postal code: 62761 /62128
- ^{1} French Land Register data, which excludes lakes, ponds, glaciers > 1 km^{2} (0.386 sq mi or 247 acres) and river estuaries.

Saint-Martin-sur-Cojeul (French pronunciation: [sɛ̃ maʁtɛ̃ syʁ kɔʒœl]; Picard: Saint-Martin-su-Cojeul) is a commune in the Pas-de-Calais department in the Hauts-de-France region of France.

== Geography ==
Saint-Martin-sur-Cojeul lies 6 miles (10 km) southeast of Arras, on the D33 road. The A1 autoroute passes by half a mile to the east of the commune.

== Population ==
Historical population
Year	Pop.	±% p.a.
1968	107	—
1975	115	+1.04%
1982	148	+3.67%
1990	186	+2.90%
1999	199	+0.75%
2007	206	+0.43%
2012	214	+0.76%
2017	210	−0.38%
2023	216	+0.47%
Source: INSEE

== Places of interest ==
- The church of St.Martin, rebuilt, as was all of the village, after the First World War.
- The Commonwealth War Graves Commission cemetery.

== See also ==
Communes of the Pas-de-Calais department
