= Frohen =

Frohen may refer to:

- Frohen-sur-Authie, a municipality in Somme department, France
- Frohen-le-Grand, former municipality, since 2007 hamlet (hameau) of Frohen-sur-Authie, Somme department, France
- Frohen-le-Petit, former municipality, since 2007 hamlet (hameau) of Frohen-sur-Authie, Somme department, France
