= Le Boisle =

- Commune
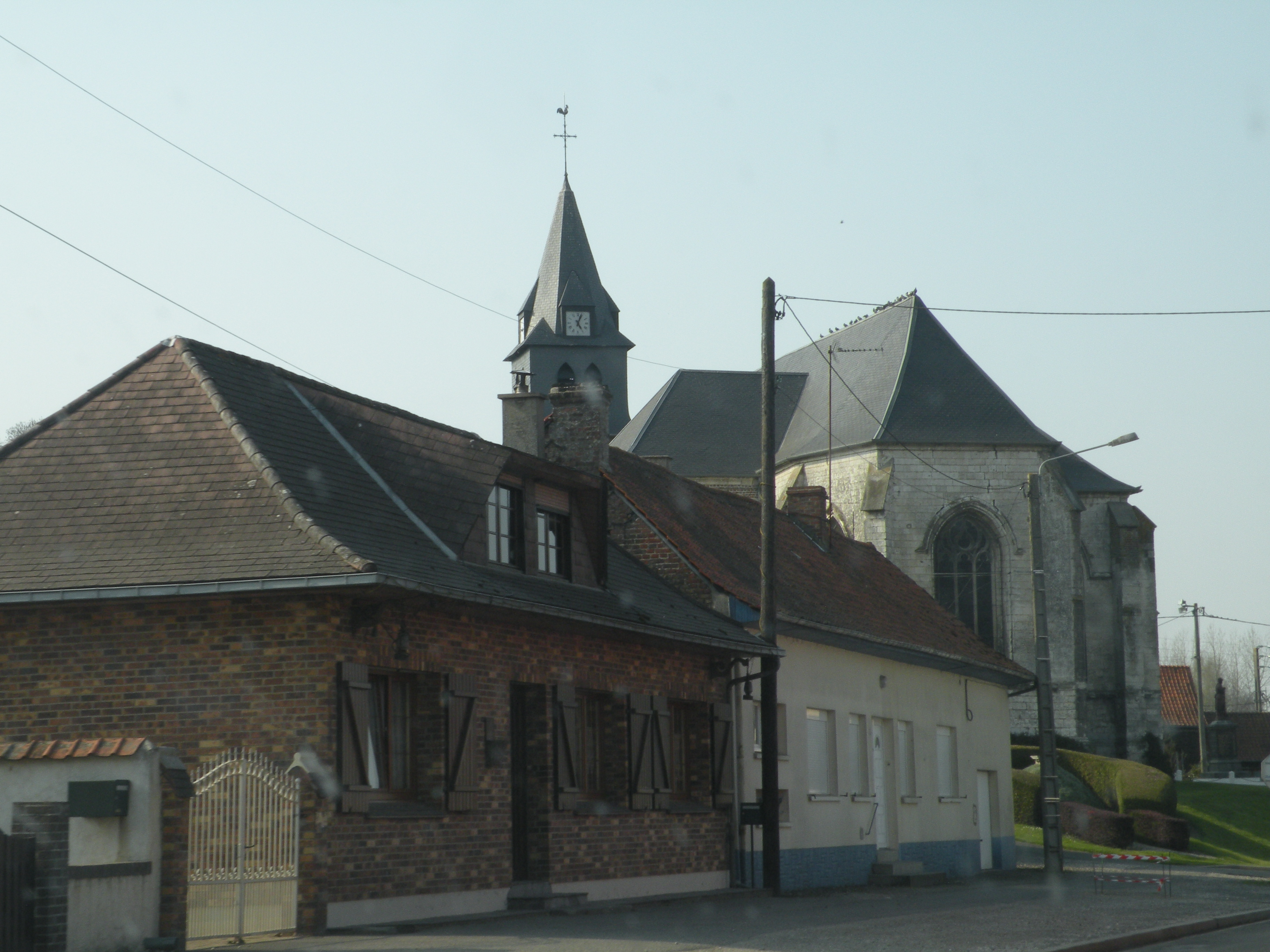
- The church in Le Boisle

- Coat of arms
- Location of Le Boisle
- Location within France Location within Hauts-de-France
- Coordinates: 50°16′19″N 1°59′07″E
- Country: France
- Region: Hauts-de-France
- Department: Somme
- Arrondissement: Abbeville
- Canton: Rue
- Intercommunality: CC Ponthieu-Marquenterre

Government
  - Mayor (2020–2026): Odile Doublet
- Area^{1}: 11.68 km^{2} (4.51 sq mi)
- Elevation: 20 m (66 ft)
- Highest elevation: 92 m (302 ft)
- Lowest elevation: 12 m (39 ft)
- Population (2023): 329
  - Density: 28.2/km^{2} (73.0/sq mi)
- Time zone: UTC+01:00 (CET)
  - Summer (DST): UTC+02:00 (CEST)
- INSEE/Postal code: 80109 /80150
- ^{1} French Land Register data, which excludes lakes, ponds, glaciers > 1 km^{2} (0.386 sq mi or 247 acres) and river estuaries.

Le Boisle (French pronunciation: [lə bwal]; Picard: L’Boèle) is a commune in the Somme department in Hauts-de-France in northern France.

== Geography ==
The commune lies in the valley of the river Authie and is traversed by the D928. The near neighbouring commune is Labroye.

== Demography ==
Historical population
Year	Pop.	±% p.a.
1968	566	—
1975	529	−0.96%
1982	506	−0.63%
1990	455	−1.32%
1999	426	−0.73%
2007	373	−1.65%
2012	384	+0.58%
2017	363	−1.12%
2023	329	−1.63%
Source: INSEE

== See also ==
- Communes of the Somme department
