= Béalcourt =

- Commune
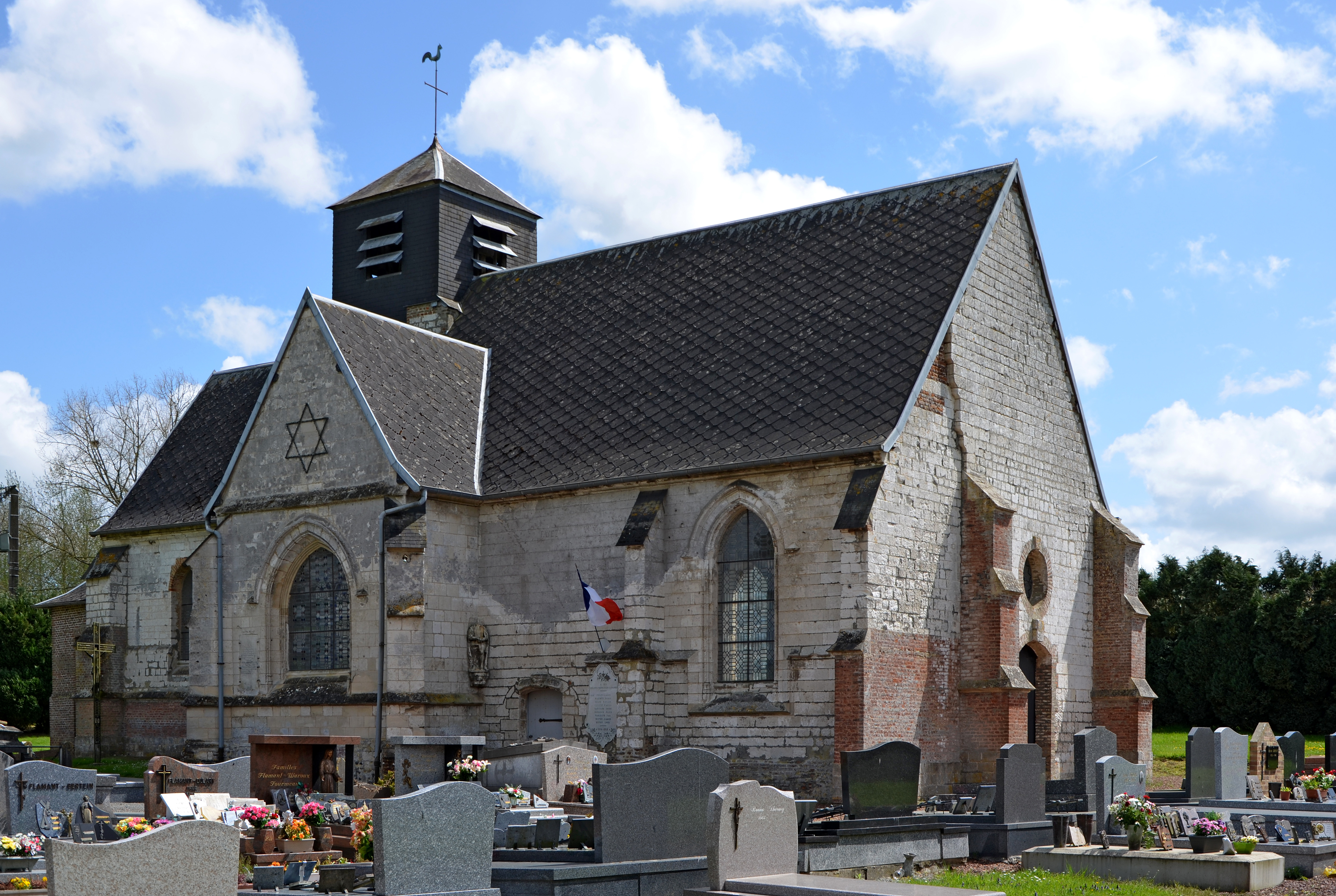
- The church in Béalcourt

- Coat of arms
- Location of Béalcourt
- Location within France Location within Hauts-de-France
- Coordinates: 50°12′18″N 2°11′07″E
- Country: France
- Region: Hauts-de-France
- Department: Somme
- Arrondissement: Amiens
- Canton: Doullens
- Intercommunality: CC Territoire Nord Picardie

Government
  - Mayor (2020–2026): Didier Septier
- Area^{1}: 3.61 km^{2} (1.39 sq mi)
- Elevation: 47 m (154 ft)
- Highest elevation: 103 m (338 ft)
- Lowest elevation: 35 m (115 ft)
- Population (2023): 126
  - Density: 34.9/km^{2} (90.4/sq mi)
- Time zone: UTC+01:00 (CET)
  - Summer (DST): UTC+02:00 (CEST)
- INSEE/Postal code: 80060 /80370
- ^{1} French Land Register data, which excludes lakes, ponds, glaciers > 1 km^{2} (0.386 sq mi or 247 acres) and river estuaries.

Béalcourt (French pronunciation: [bealkuʁ]; Picard: Biacourt) is a commune in the Somme department in Hauts-de-France in northern France.

== Geography ==
Béalcourt is situated on the D99 road, by the banks of the Authie river, the border of the departments of the Somme and the Pas-de-Calais.

== Population ==
Historical population
Year	Pop.	±% p.a.
1968	143	—
1975	138	−0.51%
1982	135	−0.31%
1990	115	−1.98%
1999	105	−1.01%
2007	100	−0.61%
2012	100	+0.00%
2017	104	+0.79%
2023	126	+3.25%
Source: INSEE

== See also ==
- Communes of the Somme department
