= Groffliers =

- Commune
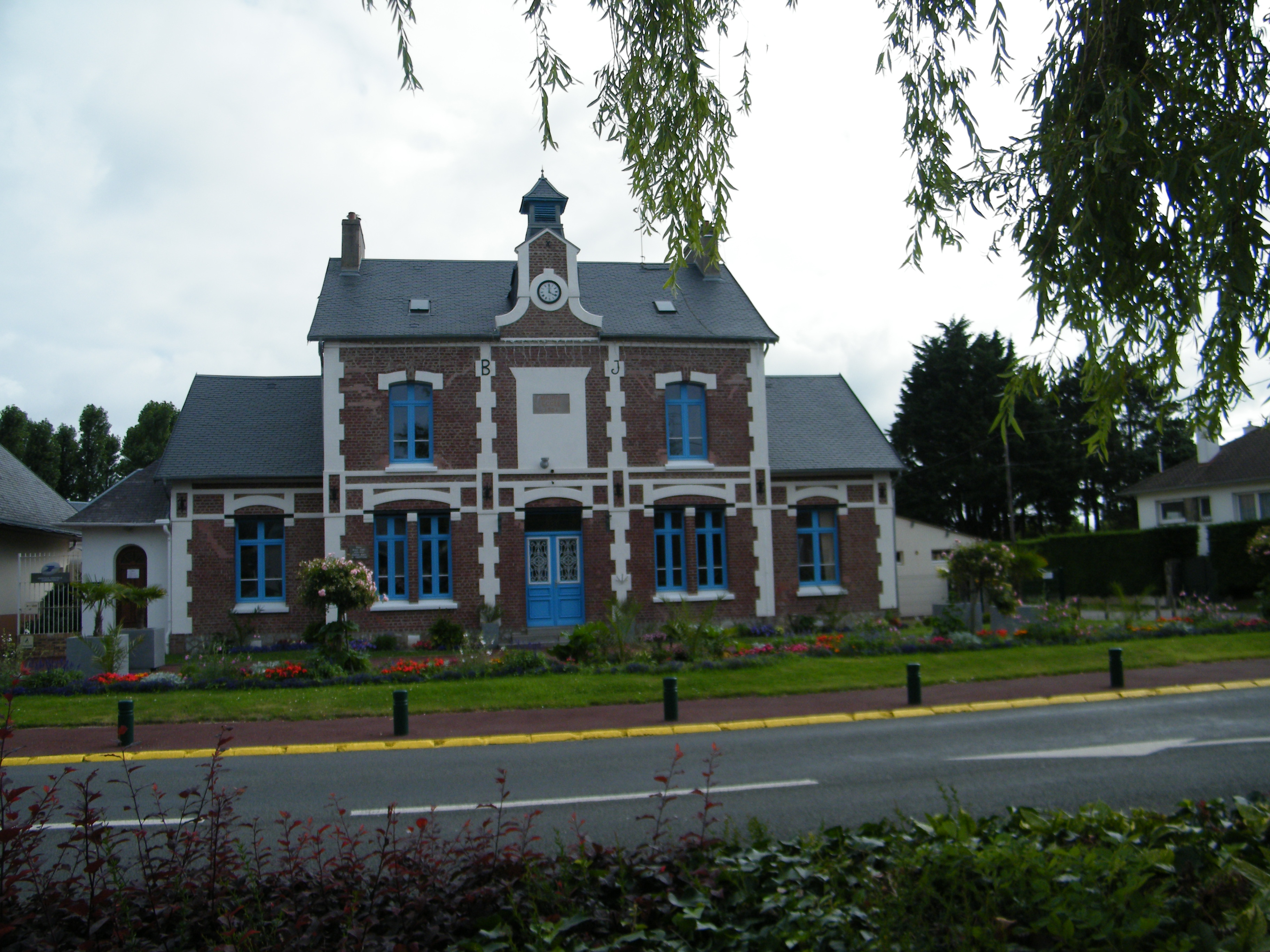
- Townhall of Groffliers

- Coat of arms
- Location of Groffliers
- Location within France Location within Hauts-de-France
- Coordinates: 50°23′08″N 1°37′01″E
- Country: France
- Region: Hauts-de-France
- Department: Pas-de-Calais
- Arrondissement: Montreuil
- Canton: Berck
- Intercommunality: CA Deux Baies en Montreuillois

Government
  - Mayor (2020–2026): Claude Vilcot
- Area^{1}: 8.09 km^{2} (3.12 sq mi)
- Elevation: 6 m (20 ft)
- Highest elevation: 33 m (108 ft)
- Lowest elevation: 0 m (0 ft)
- Population (2023): 1,470
  - Density: 182/km^{2} (471/sq mi)
- Time zone: UTC+01:00 (CET)
  - Summer (DST): UTC+02:00 (CEST)
- INSEE/Postal code: 62390 /62600
- ^{1} French Land Register data, which excludes lakes, ponds, glaciers > 1 km^{2} (0.386 sq mi or 247 acres) and river estuaries.

Groffliers (French pronunciation: [ɡʁɔflije]) is a commune in the Pas-de-Calais department in the Hauts-de-France region of France.

== Geography ==
A village situated on the coast at the bay of the Authie, some 8 miles (13 km) southwest of Montreuil-sur-Mer on the D940 road.

== Population ==
Historical population
Year	Pop.	±% p.a.
1968	477	—
1975	673	+5.04%
1982	980	+5.52%
1990	1,324	+3.83%
1999	1,422	+0.80%
2007	1,473	+0.44%
2012	1,467	−0.08%
2017	1,508	+0.55%
2023	1,470	−0.42%
Source: INSEE

== Places of interest ==
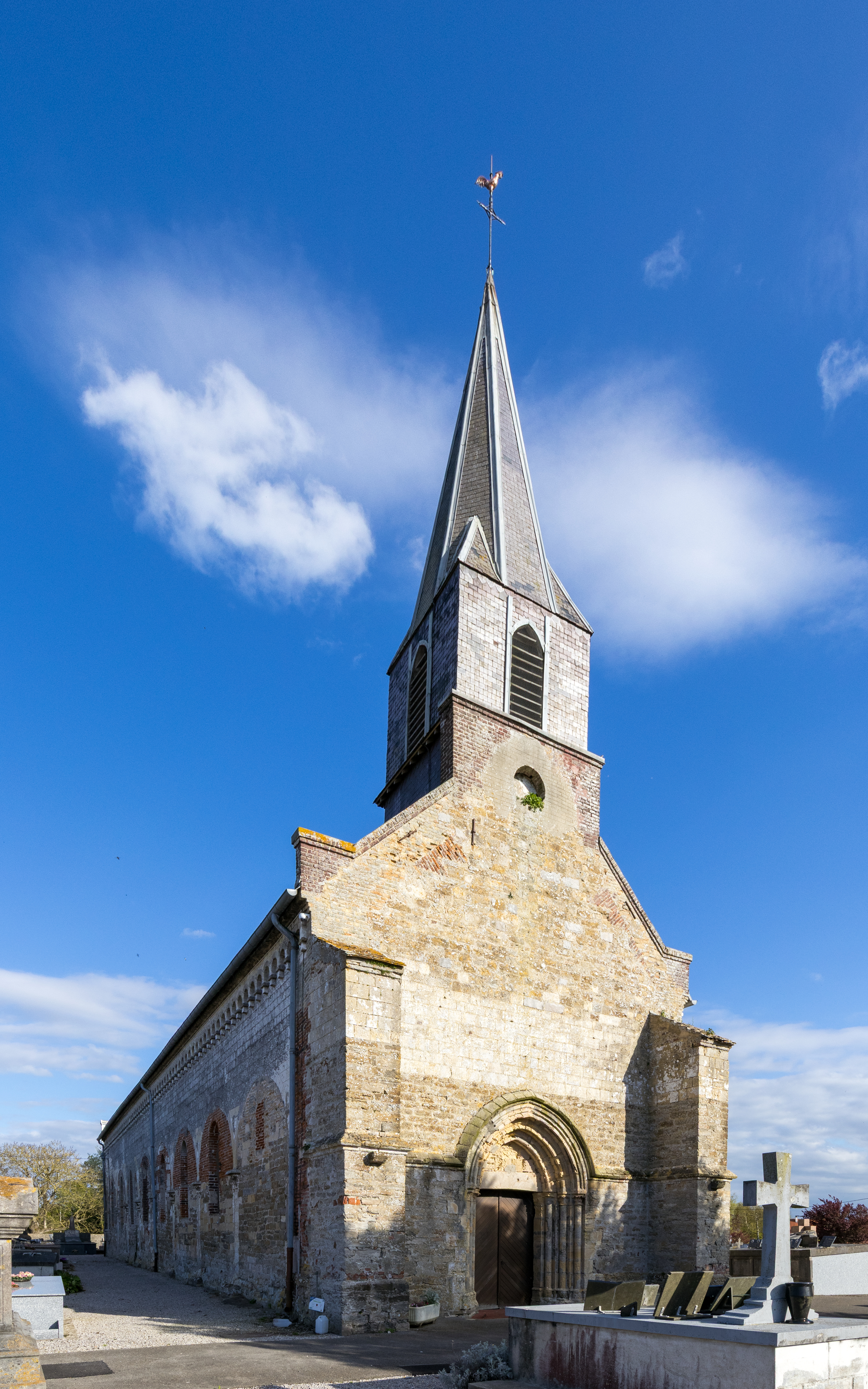
Church of Groffliers

- Church of St. Martin, dating from the twelfth century.

== See also ==
- Communes of the Pas-de-Calais department
