= Frohen-le-Grand =

Coordinates: 50.203°N 2.206°E

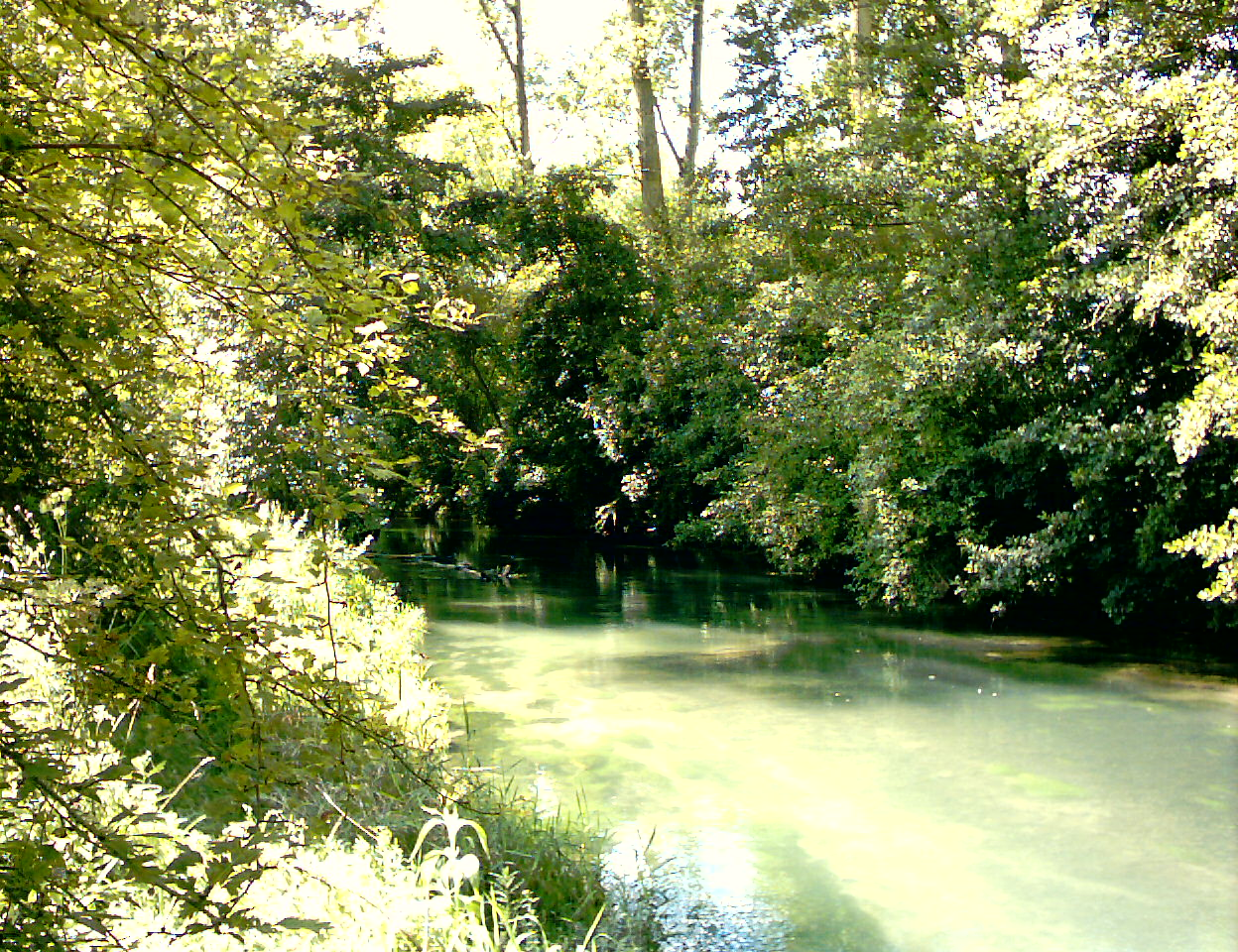
The river Authie in Frohen-le-Grand.

Location of Frohen-le-Grand in France

Frohen-le-Grand (French pronunciation: [fʁɔɑ̃ lə ɡʁɑ̃]) is a former commune in the Somme département in the Picardie region of France. Since 1 January 2007, Frohen-le-Grand and Frohen-le-Petit have combined into the new commune of Frohen-sur-Authie.

== Geography ==
Situated on the D938 road, some 20 miles (32 km) northeast of Abbeville.

== Population ==
Historical population
Year	Pop.	±% p.a.
1962	226	—
1968	212	−1.06%
1975	204	−0.55%
1982	179	−1.85%
1990	171	−0.57%
1999	174	+0.19%
2006	182	+0.64%
Source: EHESS
