= Nampont =

- Commune
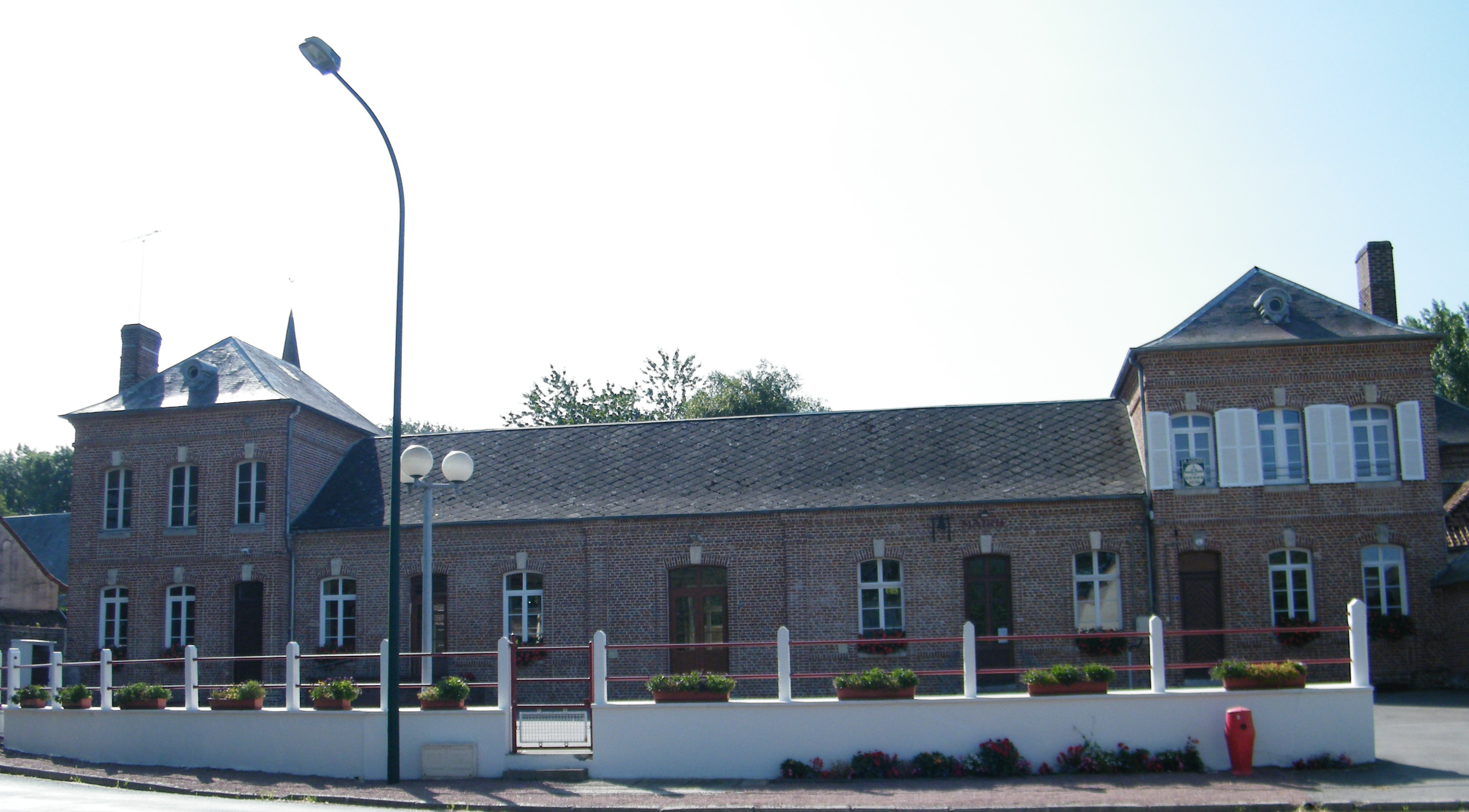
- The town hall and school in Nampont
- Location of Nampont
- Location within France Location within Hauts-de-France
- Coordinates: 50°20′58″N 1°44′47″E
- Country: France
- Region: Hauts-de-France
- Department: Somme
- Arrondissement: Abbeville
- Canton: Rue
- Intercommunality: CC Ponthieu-Marquenterre

Government
  - Mayor (2020–2026): Bertrand Dufour
- Area^{1}: 19.39 km^{2} (7.49 sq mi)
- Elevation: 10 m (33 ft)
- Highest elevation: 67 m (220 ft)
- Lowest elevation: 2 m (6.6 ft)
- Population (2023): 261
  - Density: 13.5/km^{2} (34.9/sq mi)
- Time zone: UTC+01:00 (CET)
  - Summer (DST): UTC+02:00 (CEST)
- INSEE/Postal code: 80580 /80120
- ^{1} French Land Register data, which excludes lakes, ponds, glaciers > 1 km^{2} (0.386 sq mi or 247 acres) and river estuaries.

Nampont (French pronunciation: [nɑ̃pɔ̃]; or Nampont-Saint-Martin) is a commune in the Somme department in Hauts-de-France in northern France.

== Geography ==
Nampont is situated on the banks of the Authie river, at the junction of the N1 and D12 roads and on the border of the departments of the Somme and the Pas-de-Calais.

== Population ==
Historical population
| Year | Pop. | ±% p.a. |
|---|---|---|
| 1968 | 342 | — |
| 1975 | 305 | −1.62% |
| 1982 | 263 | −2.09% |
| 1990 | 242 | −1.03% |
| 1999 | 228 | −0.66% |
| 2007 | 264 | +1.85% |
| 2012 | 239 | −1.97% |
| 2017 | 248 | +0.74% |
| 2023 | 261 | +0.86% |
Source: INSEE

== Places and monuments ==
The Maison Forte, built in the 15th century as a border-post on the Authie. After the Spanish invasion, it was transformed into a customs post for the imposition of the Gabelle (taxes levied on salt and other commodities), between Spanish Artois and French Picardy.

Nowadays, the Maison Forte is the clubhouse of Nampont-Saint-Martin golf club. Public access is limited to exterior views from the road or the courtyard.

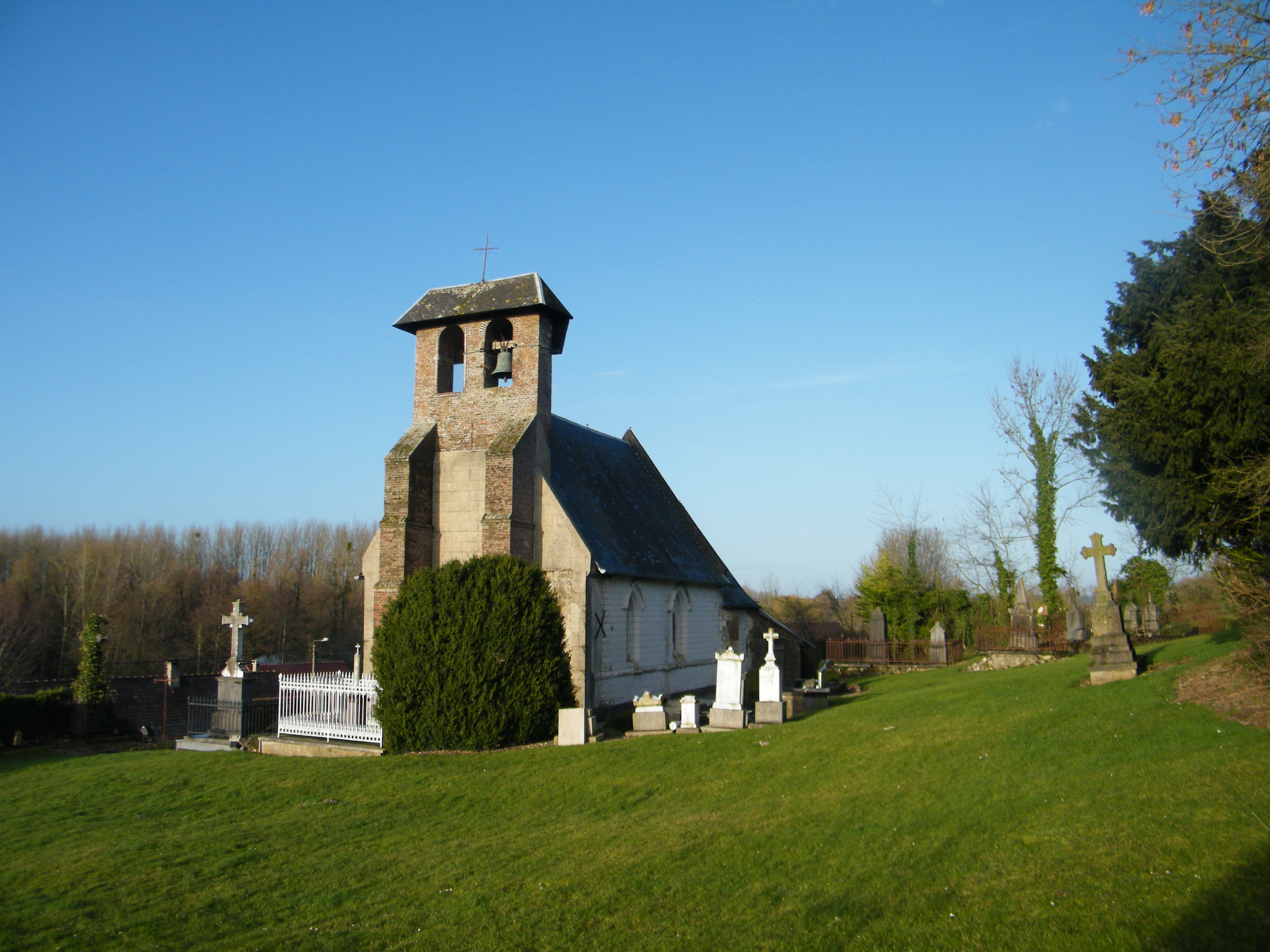
Church in Montigny.

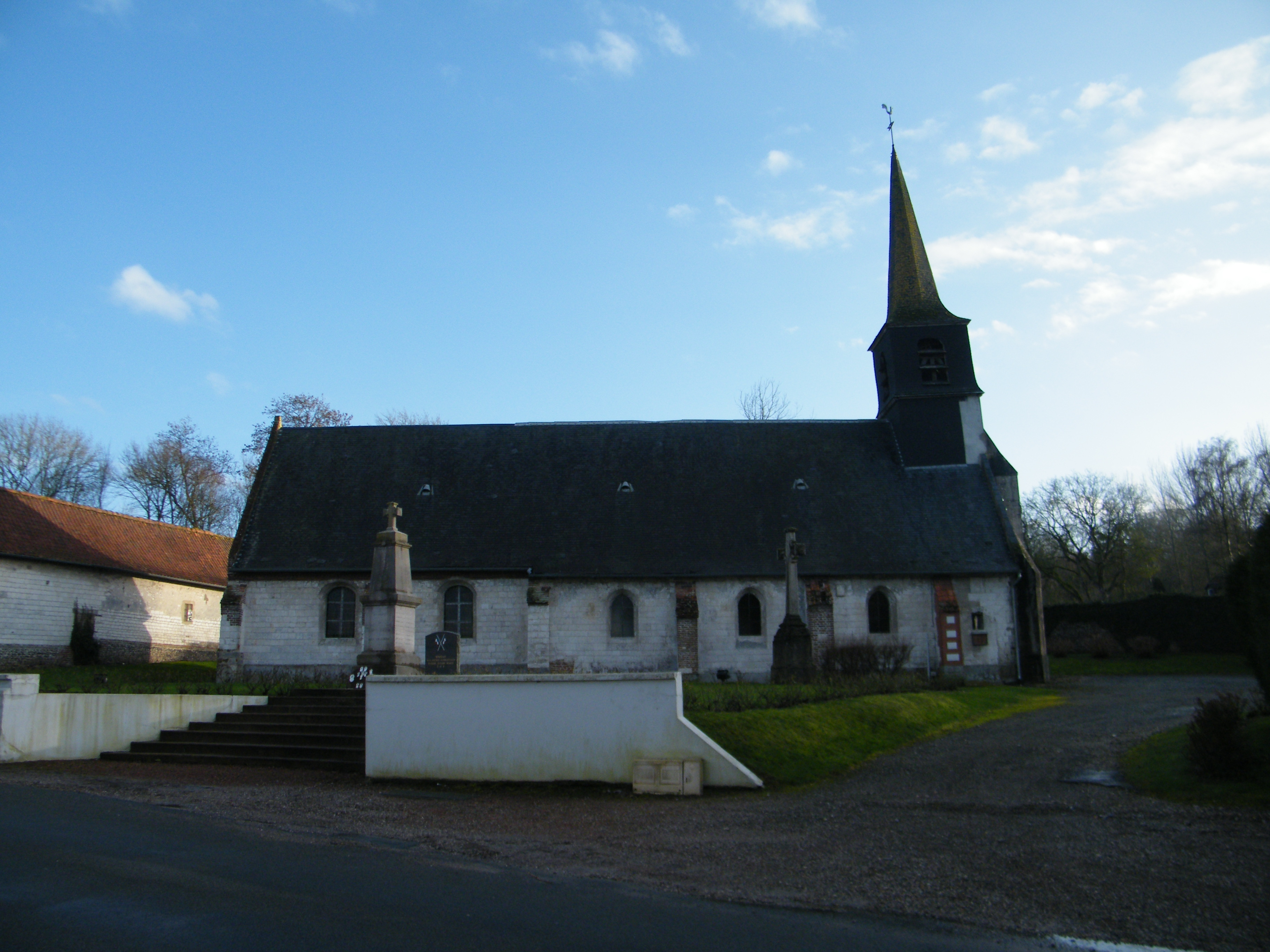
Church in Nampont.

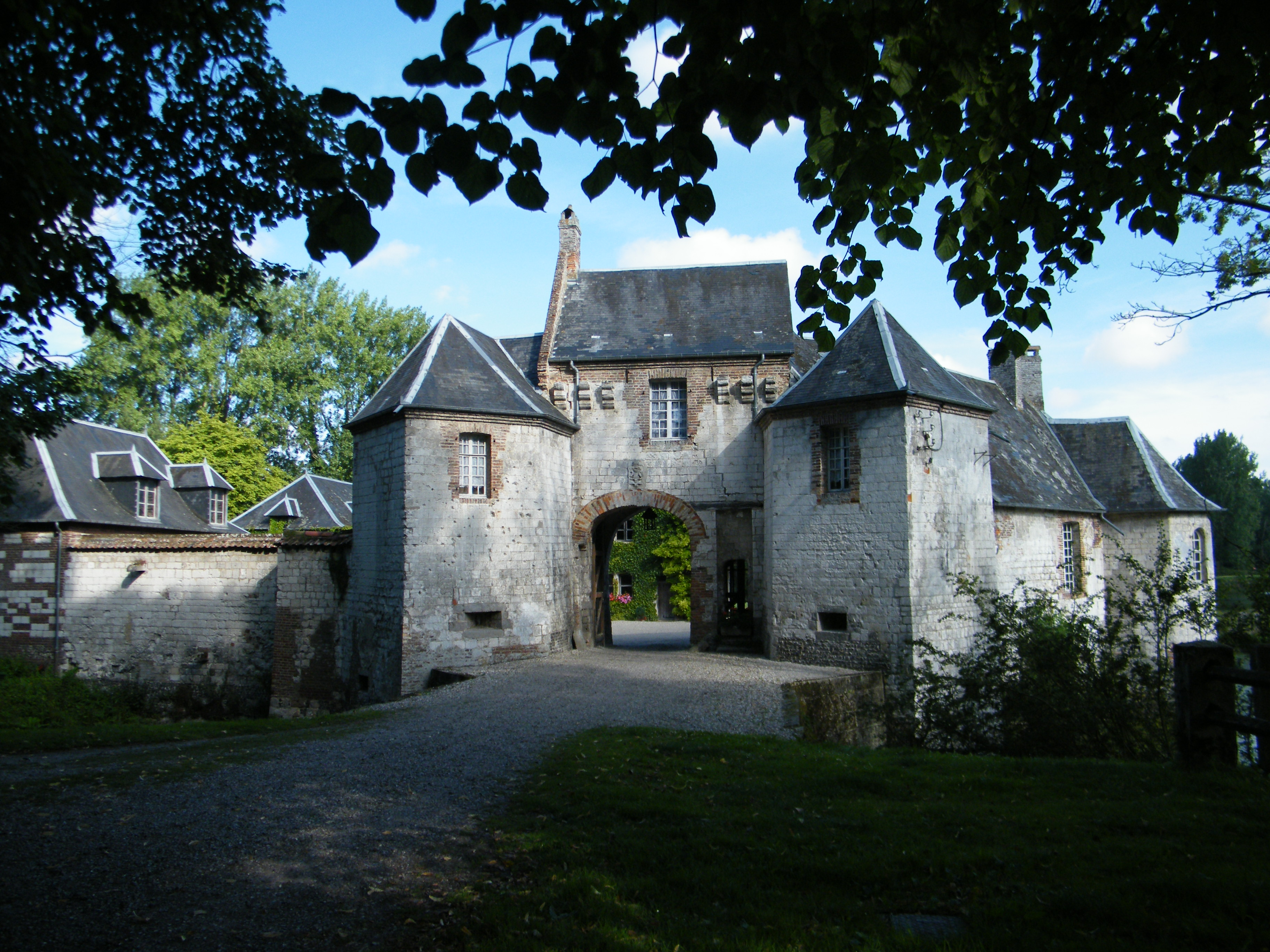
Entrance of the château-fort.

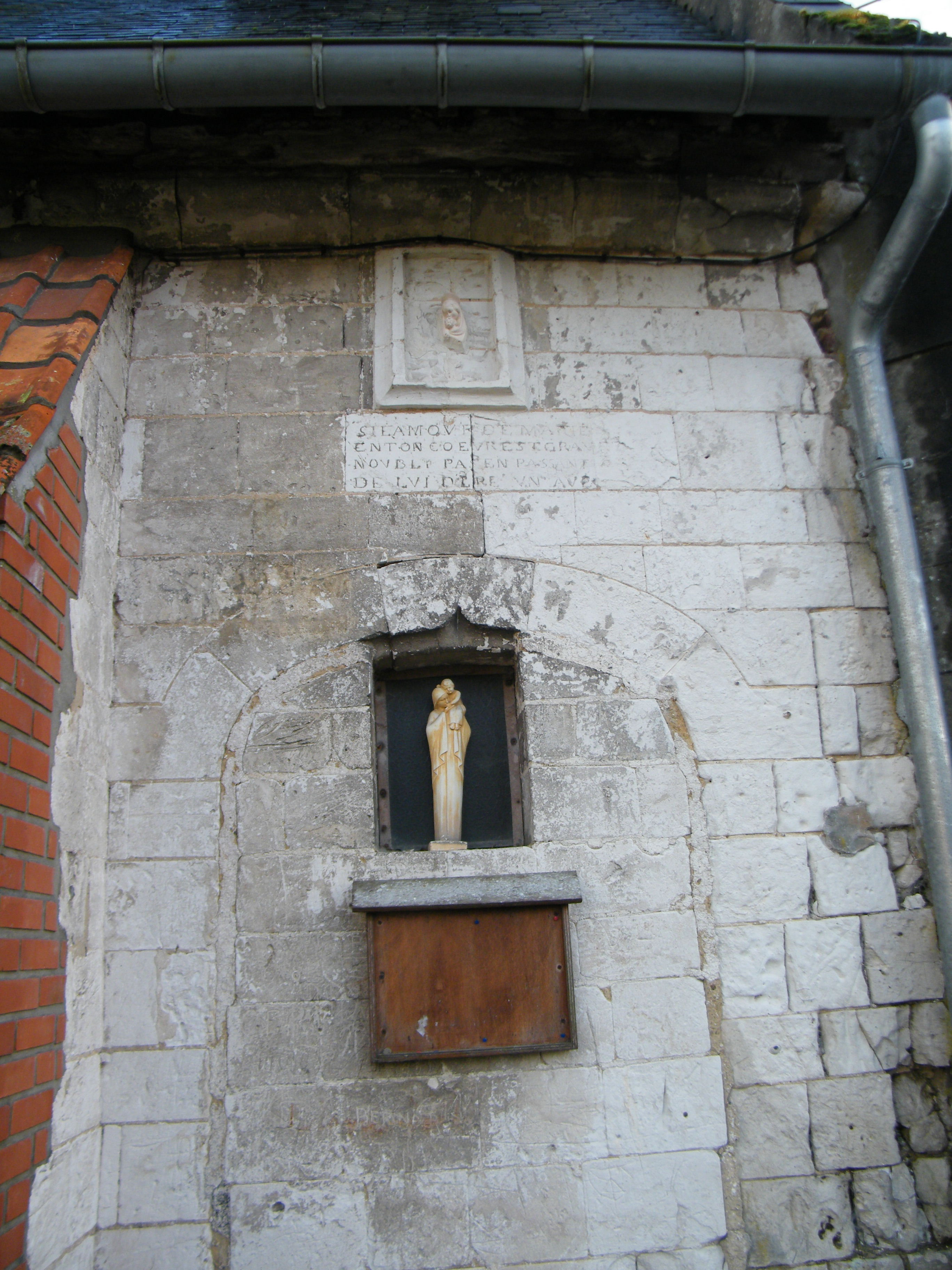
On the church in Nampont.

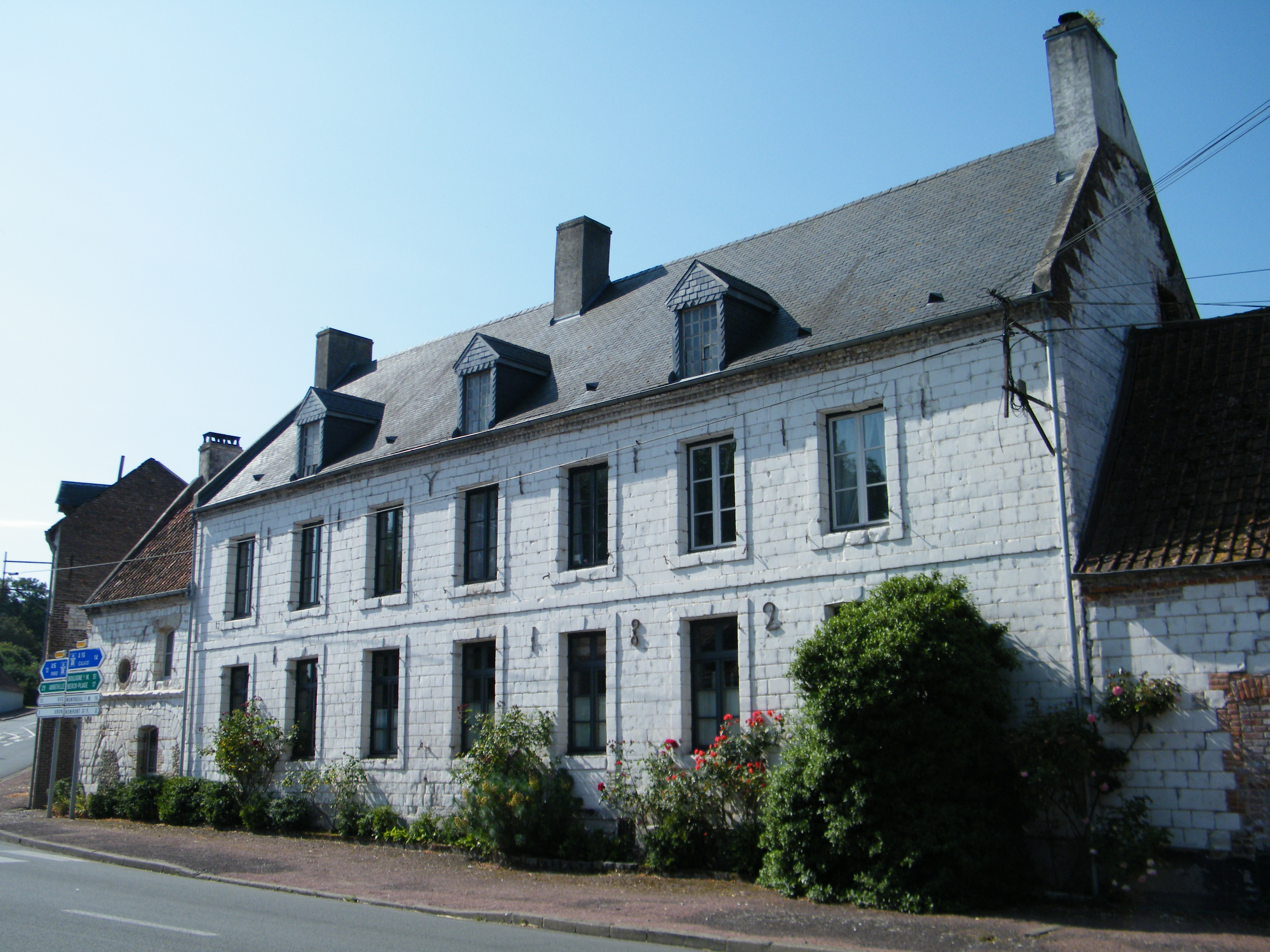
Old "relais de poste".

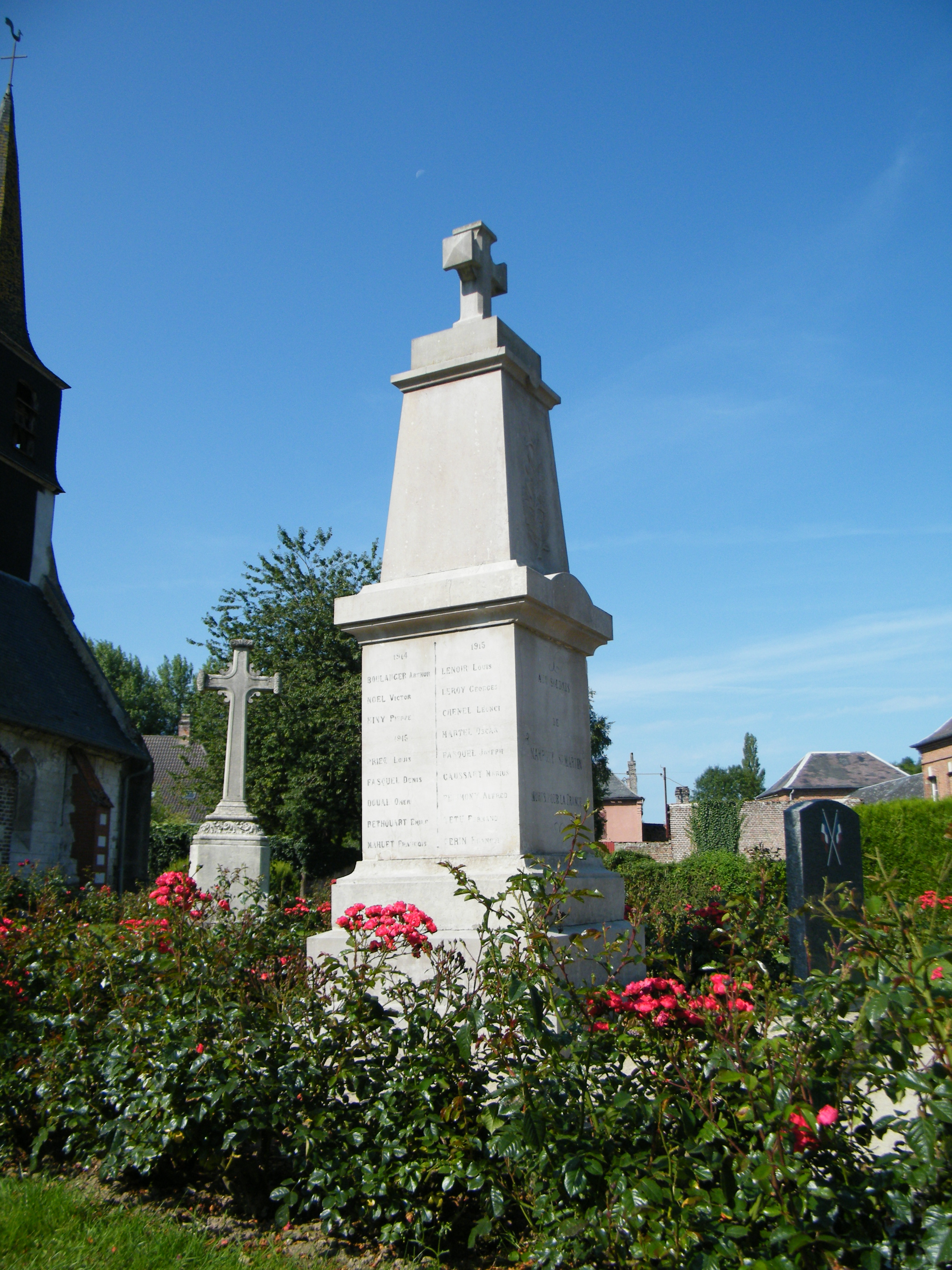
Monument.

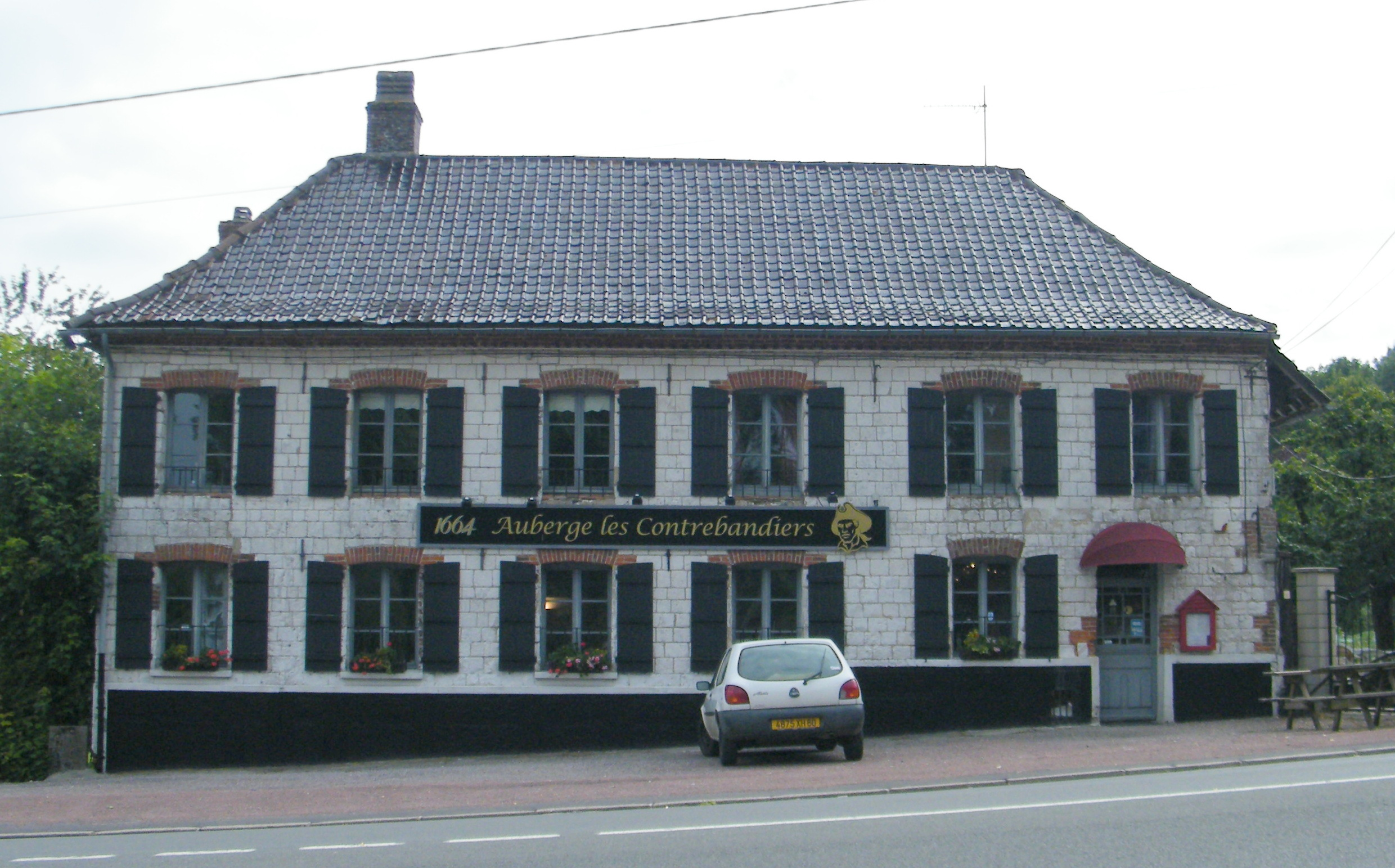
"Auberge des contrebandiers".

== See also ==
- Communes of the Somme department
