= Labroye =

Labroye De Bomen
- Commune
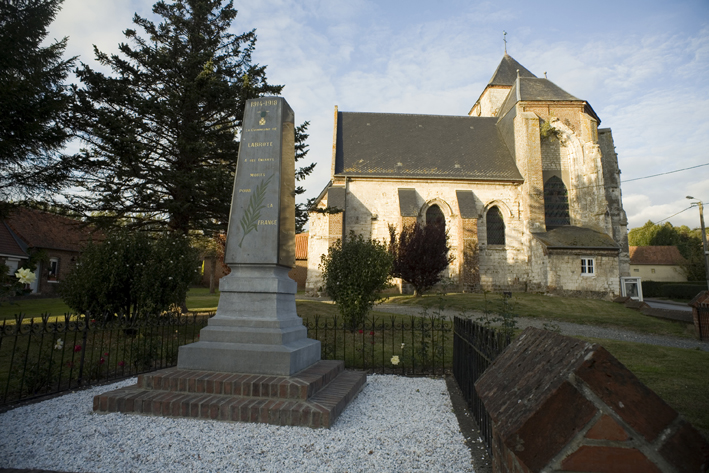
- The monument to the dead and church of Labroye

- Coat of arms
- Location of Labroye
- Location within France Location within Hauts-de-France
- Coordinates: 50°16′44″N 1°59′25″E
- Country: France
- Region: Hauts-de-France
- Department: Pas-de-Calais
- Arrondissement: Montreuil
- Canton: Auxi-le-Château
- Intercommunality: CC des 7 Vallées

Government
  - Mayor (2020–2026): Hubert Hecquet
- Area^{1}: 8.15 km^{2} (3.15 sq mi)
- Elevation: 25 m (82 ft)
- Highest elevation: 117 m (384 ft)
- Lowest elevation: 12 m (39 ft)
- Population (2023): 140
  - Density: 17/km^{2} (44/sq mi)
- Time zone: UTC+01:00 (CET)
  - Summer (DST): UTC+02:00 (CEST)
- INSEE/Postal code: 62481 /62140
- ^{1} French Land Register data, which excludes lakes, ponds, glaciers > 1 km^{2} (0.386 sq mi or 247 acres) and river estuaries.

Labroye (French pronunciation: [labʁwa]; Picard: L’Arbroie; West Flemish: De Bomen) is a commune in the Pas-de-Calais department in northern France.

== Geography ==
Labroye is situated in a hillside environment in the valley of the river Authie, which flows through the village. A mixture of woodland and farms, the village has many examples of typical Picardie houses, built in the traditional style with wattle and daub, covered in tar and then whitewashed. The village is at the crossroads of two départemental routes. One, north-south going from Hesdin to Abbeville, the D928 and the other going east-west to Auxi-le-Château and on to Berck, the D119.

== Demography ==
Historical population
Year	Pop.	±% p.a.
1968	181	—
1975	144	−3.21%
1982	146	+0.20%
1990	157	+0.91%
1999	173	+1.08%
2007	170	−0.22%
2012	172	+0.23%
2017	165	−0.83%
2023	140	−2.70%
Source: INSEE

== Economy ==
Agricultural activity is confined to the raising of cattle for milk and beef, and pig farming .

== Places of interest ==
- The church, solid and reinforced, was once accompanied by a castle, which gave refuge to Philippe VI following the battle of Crecy that took place some kilometres to the south on 26 August 1346.
- A campground, a restaurant, and some guest rooms are available for tourist leisure activities: hunting, fishing, and walking.

== See also ==
- Communes of the Pas-de-Calais department
