= Outrebois =

- Commune
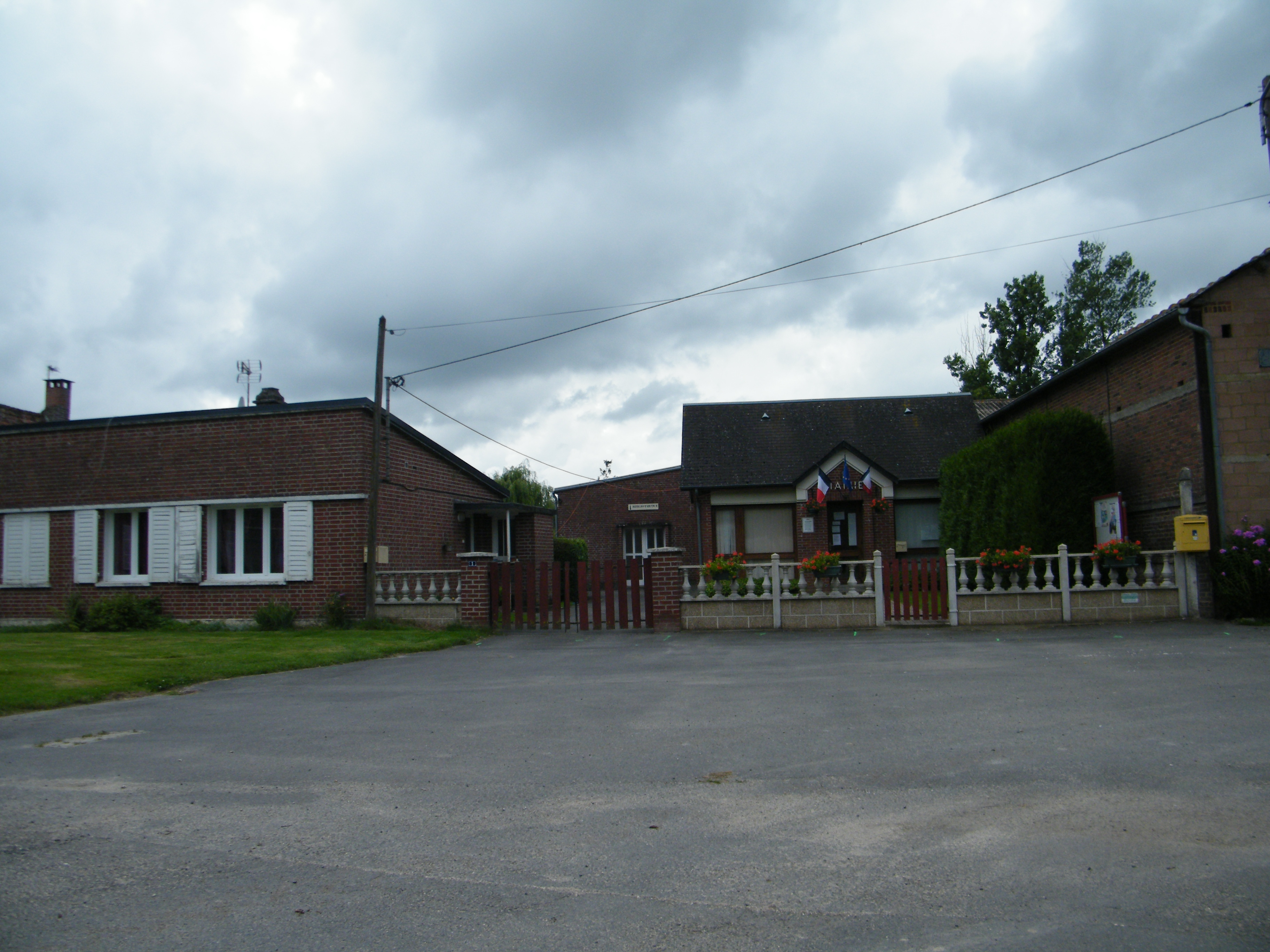
- The town hall in Outrebois
- Location of Outrebois
- Location within France Location within Hauts-de-France
- Coordinates: 50°10′32″N 2°15′09″E
- Country: France
- Region: Hauts-de-France
- Department: Somme
- Arrondissement: Amiens
- Canton: Doullens
- Intercommunality: CC Territoire Nord Picardie

Government
  - Mayor (2020–2026): Emmanuel Maréchal
- Area^{1}: 9.57 km^{2} (3.69 sq mi)
- Elevation: 50 m (160 ft)
- Highest elevation: 130 m (430 ft)
- Lowest elevation: 42 m (138 ft)
- Population (2023): 313
  - Density: 32.7/km^{2} (84.7/sq mi)
- Time zone: UTC+01:00 (CET)
  - Summer (DST): UTC+02:00 (CEST)
- INSEE/Postal code: 80614 /80600
- ^{1} French Land Register data, which excludes lakes, ponds, glaciers > 1 km^{2} (0.386 sq mi or 247 acres) and river estuaries.

Outrebois (French pronunciation: [utʁəbwa]) is a commune in the Somme department in Hauts-de-France in northern France.

== Geography ==
Outrebois is situated on the D59 road, some 21 miles (34 km) northeast of Abbeville on the banks of the river Authie, the border with the Pas-de-Calais.

== Population ==
Historical population
Year	Pop.	±% p.a.
1968	298	—
1975	297	−0.05%
1982	252	−2.32%
1990	251	−0.05%
1999	253	+0.09%
2007	263	+0.49%
2012	312	+3.48%
2017	312	+0.00%
2023	313	+0.05%
Source: INSEE

== See also ==
- Communes of the Somme department
