= Fort-Mahon-Plage =

- Commune
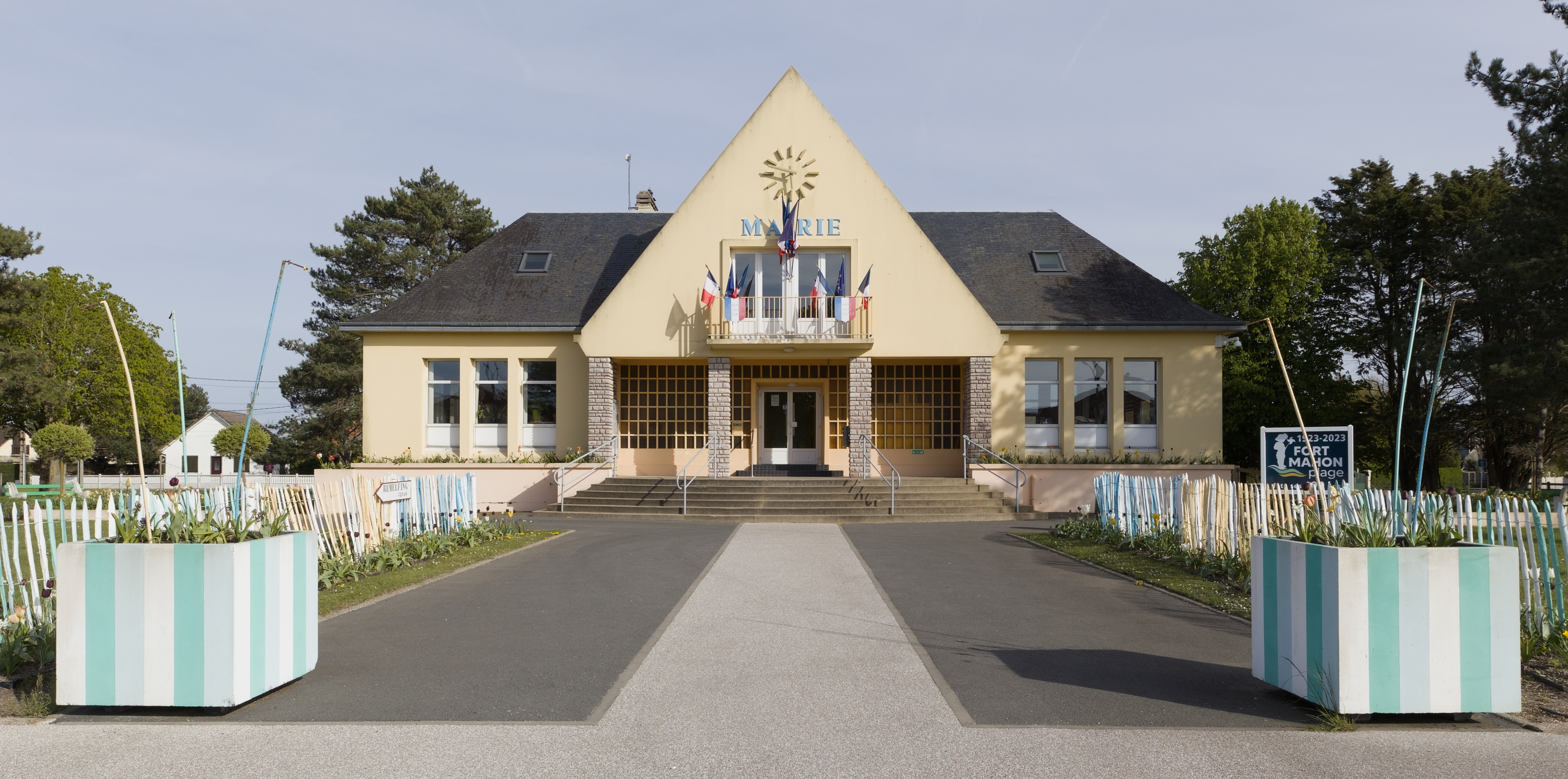
- The town hall in Fort-Mahon

- Coat of arms
- Location of Fort-Mahon-Plage
- Location within France Location within Hauts-de-France
- Coordinates: 50°20′31″N 1°34′11″E
- Country: France
- Region: Hauts-de-France
- Department: Somme
- Arrondissement: Abbeville
- Canton: Rue
- Intercommunality: CC Ponthieu-Marquenterre

Government
  - Mayor (2020–2026): Alain Baillet
- Area^{1}: 13.04 km^{2} (5.03 sq mi)
- Elevation: 4 m (13 ft)
- Highest elevation: 30 m (98 ft)
- Lowest elevation: 1 m (3.3 ft)
- Population (2023): 1,363
  - Density: 104.5/km^{2} (270.7/sq mi)
- Time zone: UTC+01:00 (CET)
  - Summer (DST): UTC+02:00 (CEST)
- INSEE/Postal code: 80333 /80120
- ^{1} French Land Register data, which excludes lakes, ponds, glaciers > 1 km^{2} (0.386 sq mi or 247 acres) and river estuaries.

Fort-Mahon-Plage (French pronunciation: [fɔʁ ma.ɔ̃ plaʒ]) is a commune in the Somme department in Hauts-de-France in northern France.

== Geography ==
The commune is situated on the coast of the English Channel and endowed with a sandy beach and massive sand dunes, Fort-Mahon-Plage attracts many tourists, especially during the summer and at the weekends. Thanks to investment and the fact the town meets many environmental criteria, the town is officially classified (since 2006), as a “station balnéaire”.

== Population ==
Historical population
Year	Pop.	±% p.a.
1968	976	—
1975	978	+0.03%
1982	962	−0.24%
1990	1,042	+1.00%
1999	1,140	+1.00%
2007	1,298	+1.64%
2012	1,234	−1.01%
2017	1,259	+0.40%
2023	1,363	+1.33%
Source: INSEE

== History ==
Fort-Mahon-Plage is not a very old town. It seems certain that it did not exist before the 18th century, except, of course, the superb sand dunes and the sea. Considered rather cold and wild, this part of the coast would have welcomed only fishermen and shellfish gatherers. The first town was raised there only a little more than two centuries ago, with a few small shepherds’ huts in 1790. Fort-Mahon-Plage was not considered a commune at all until 1922, when it was officially identified as a separate village from its neighbour Quend. Urbanization was steady, notably in the 1950s, with the immense beach of fine sand, in contrast to many of the pebble beaches of Normandy, doing a lot to attract tourists, as well as a soft and pleasant sea during the summer. The huge beach later became famous for its water activities, most notably landyacht racing, wind-surfing and kiting.

The town also invested heavily in its infrastructure, most notably the very long principal promenade, the "Avenue de la plage" (Beach Avenue), of a quality design and layout that reinforces the attractiveness of the town.

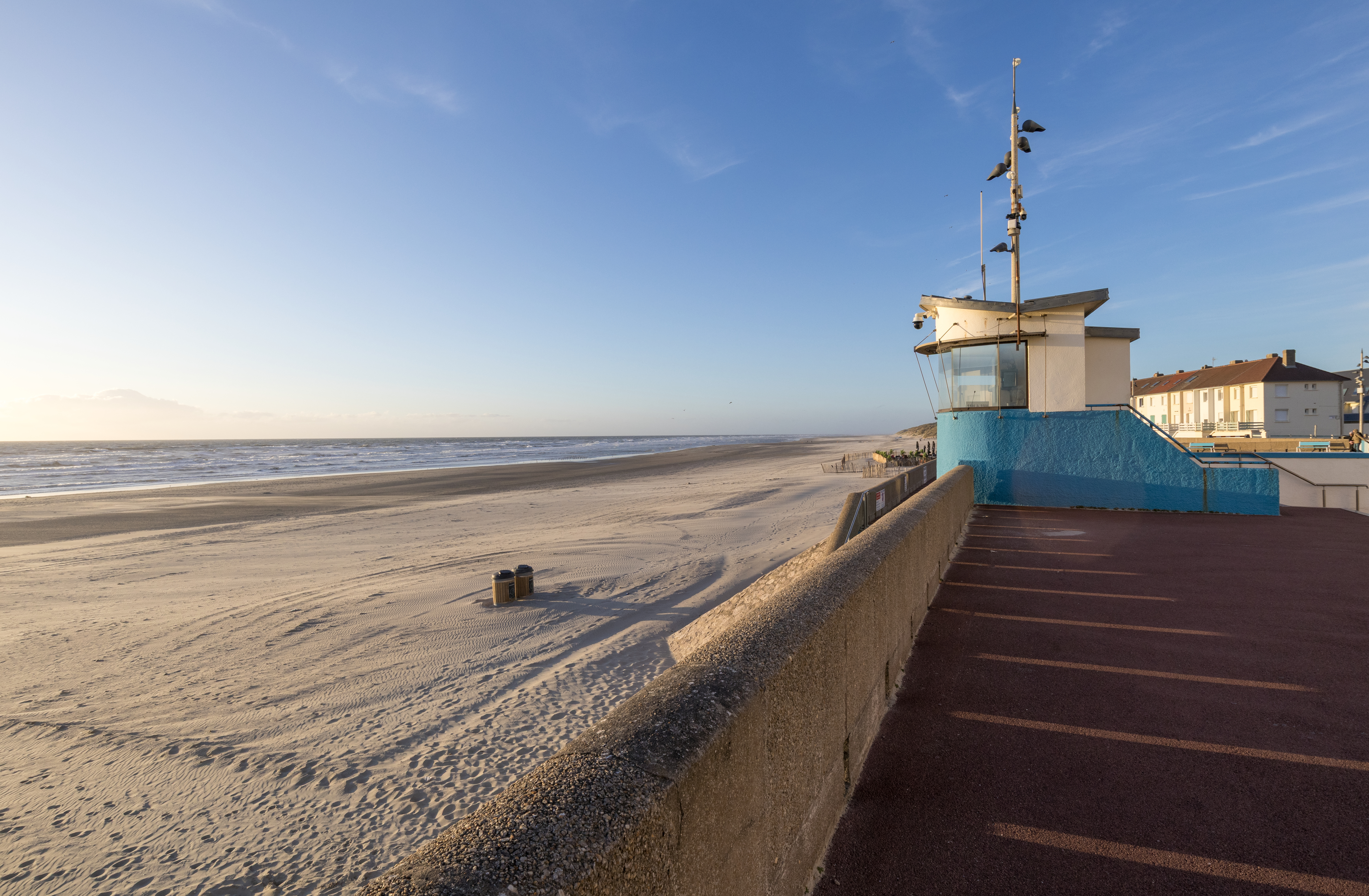
The beach

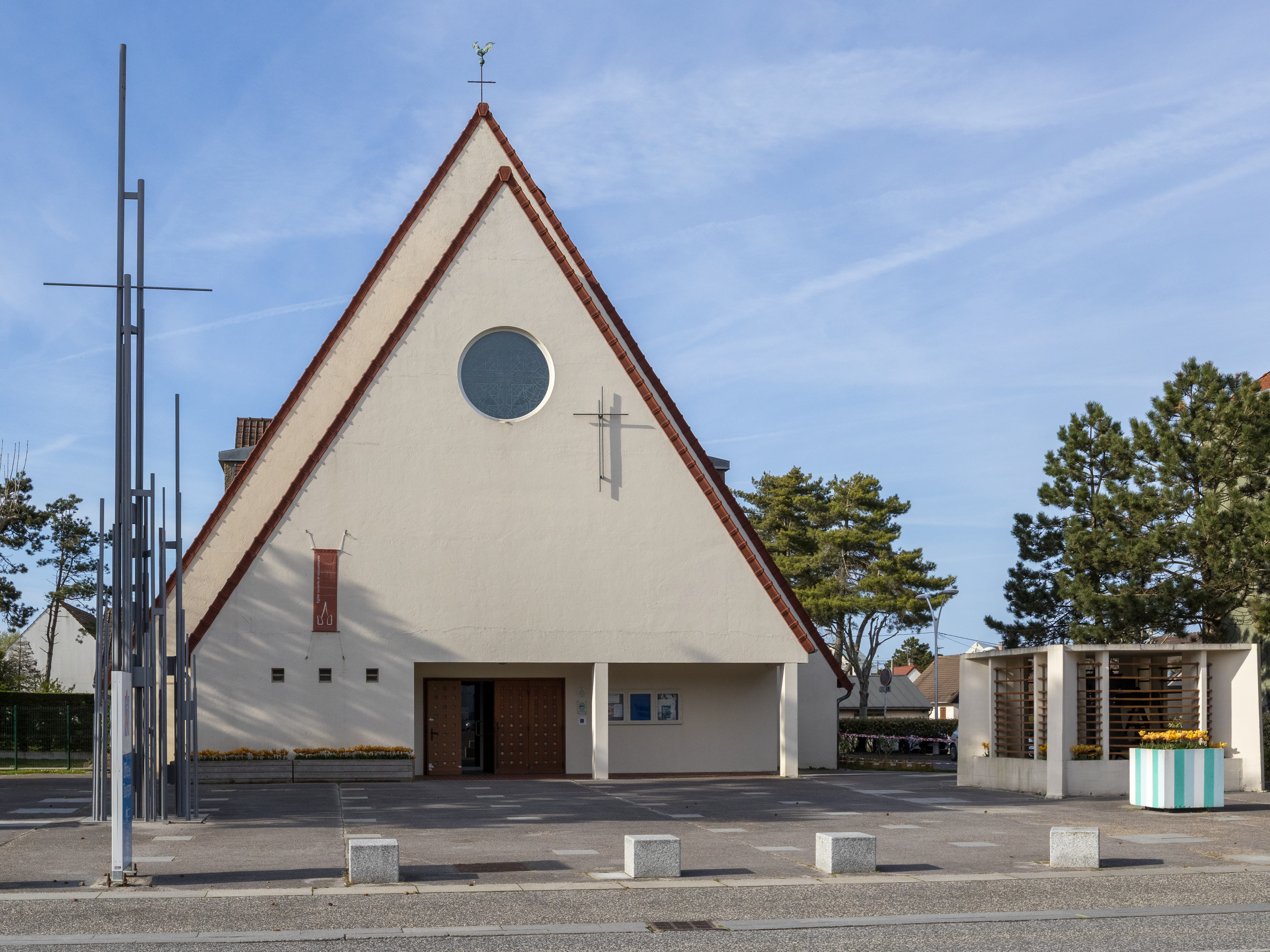
The church

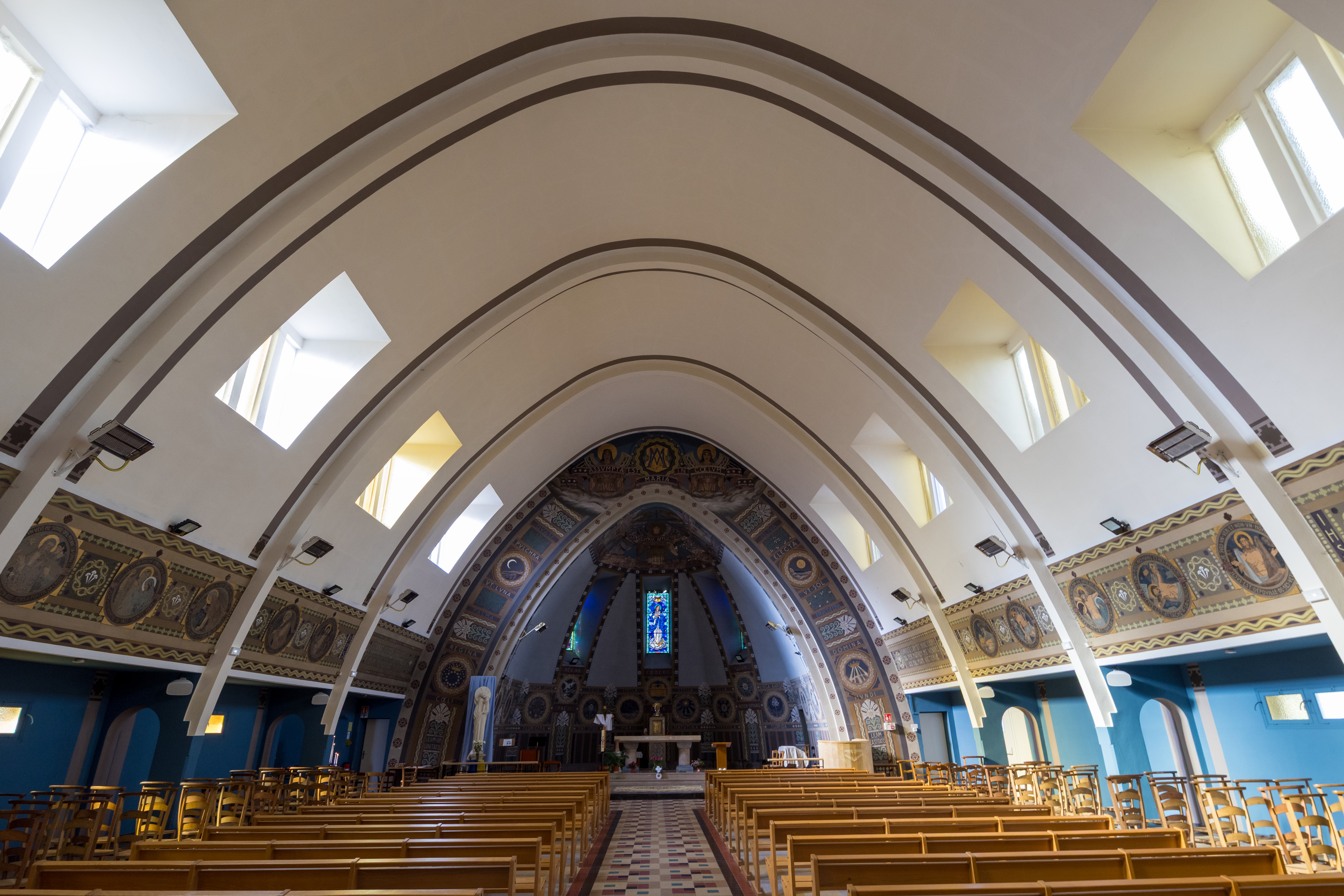

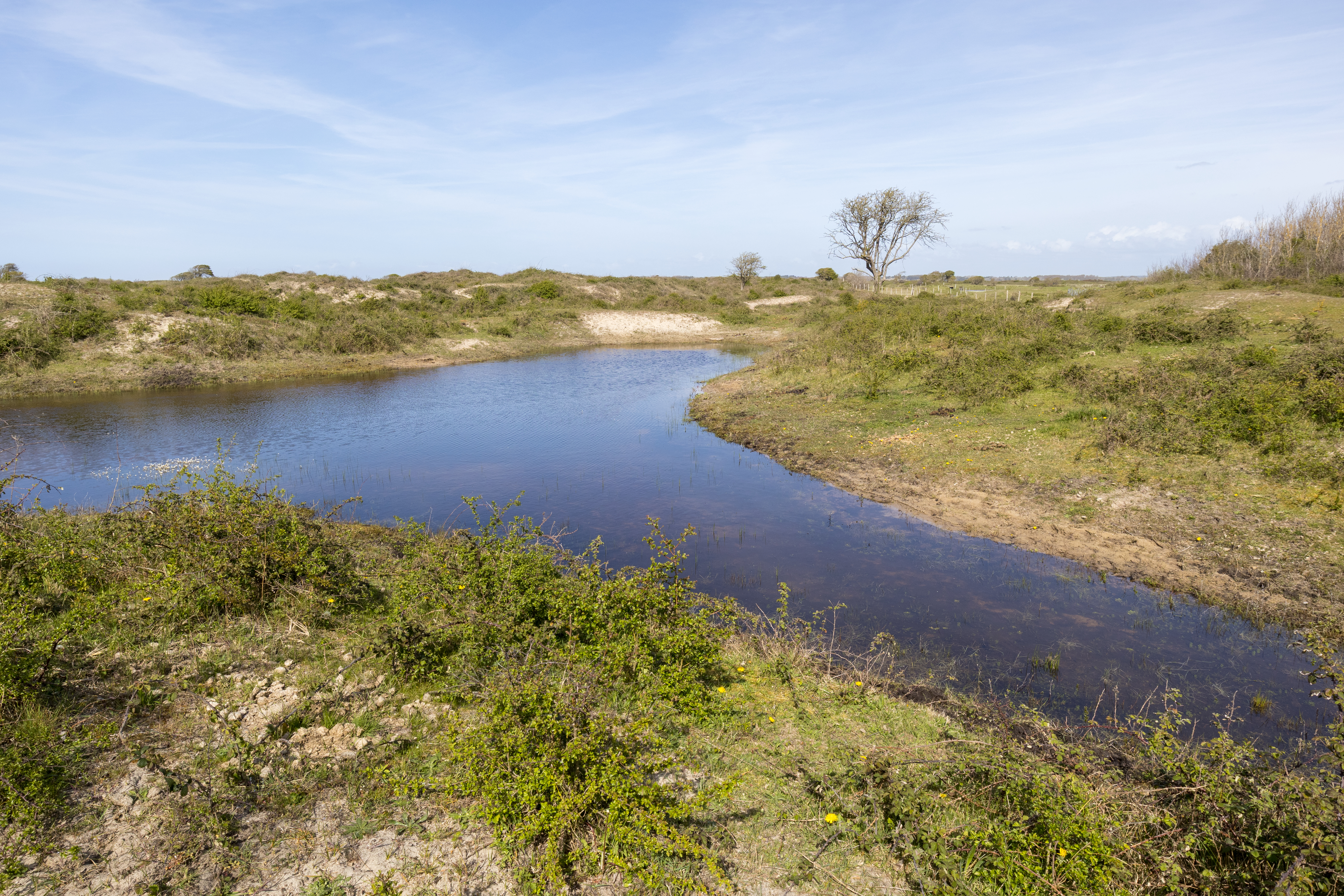
Authie Bay

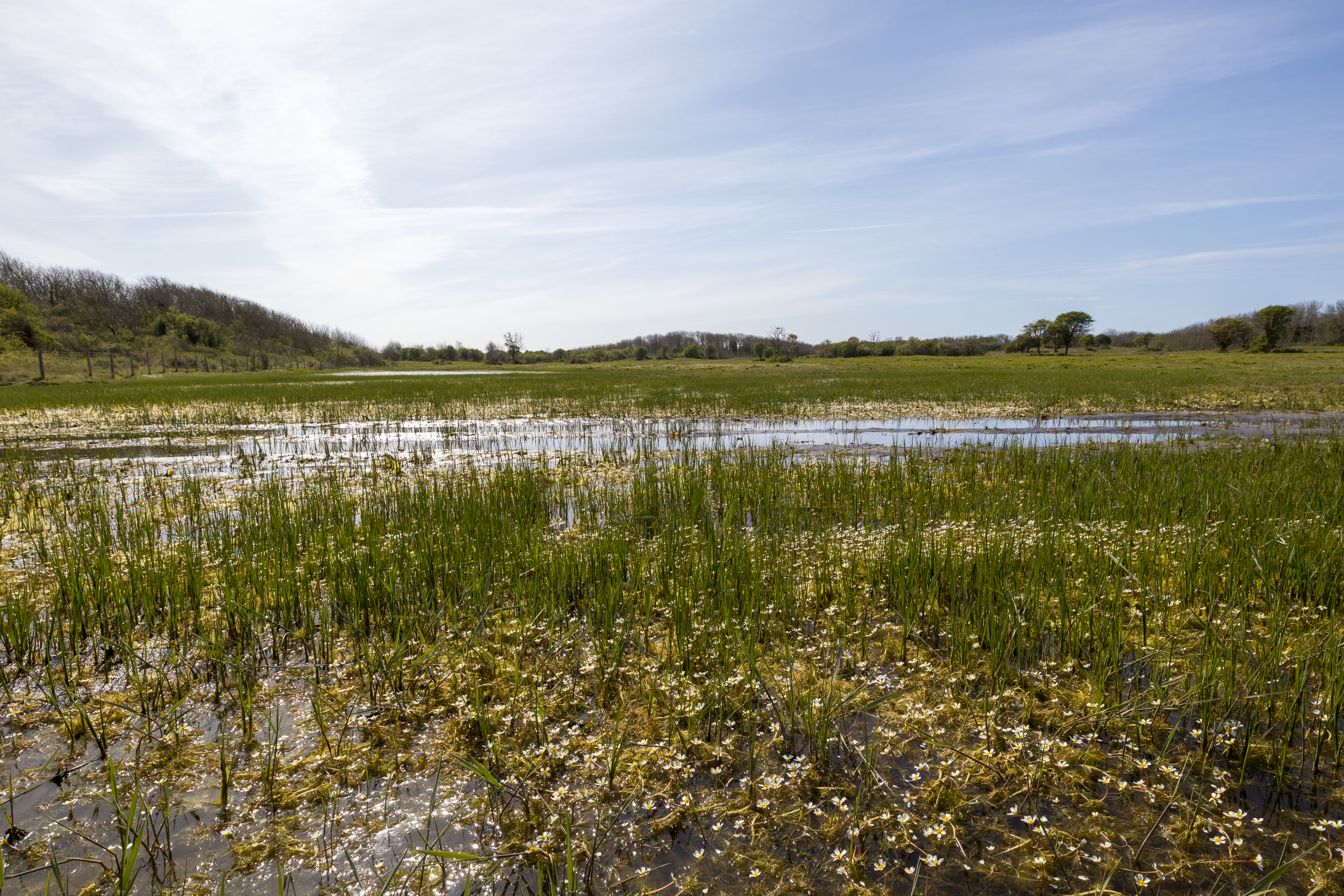

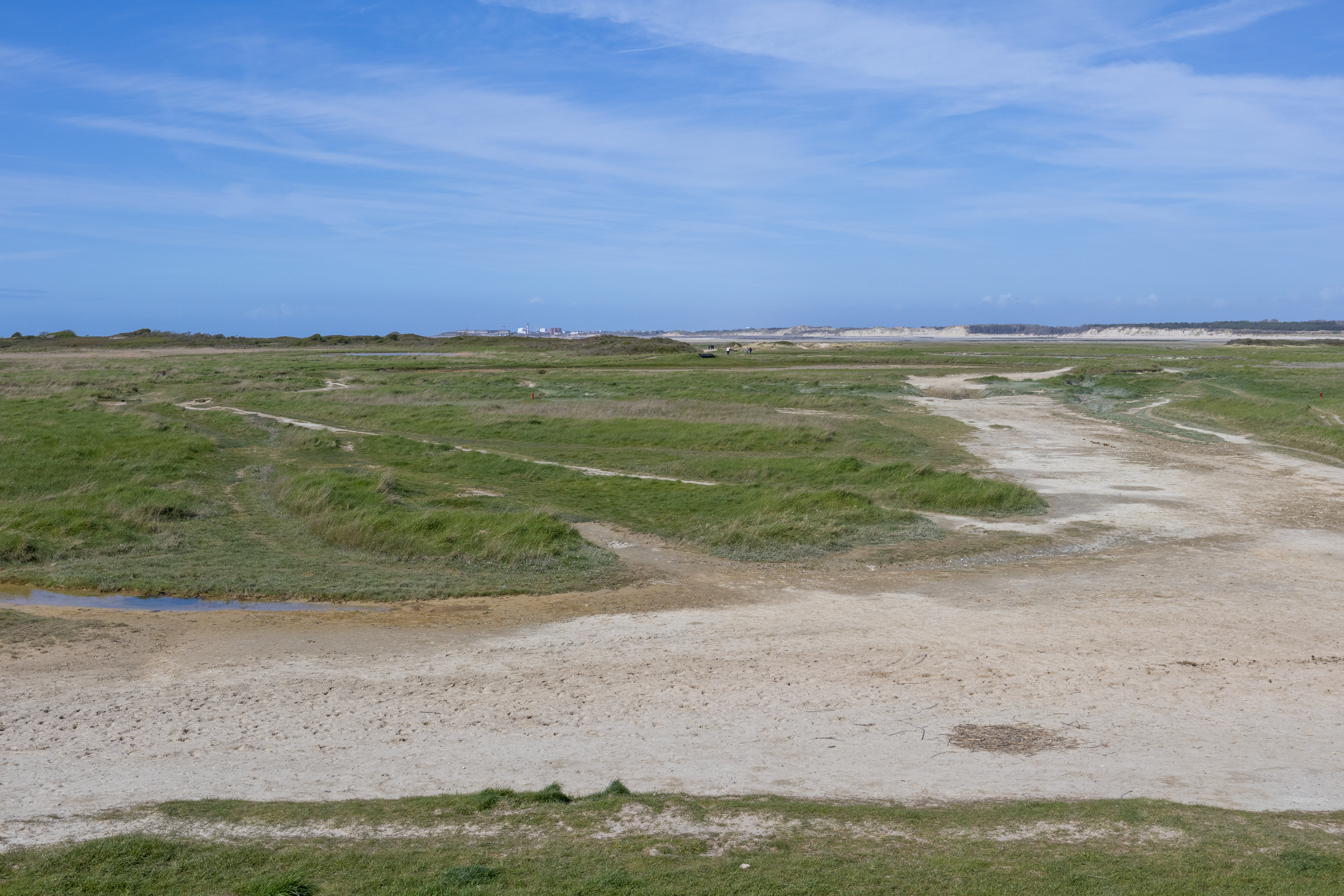
Authie Bay at low tide

== Twin towns ==
- Bewdley (United Kingdom)
- Wellin (Belgium)

== See also ==
- Communes of the Somme department
