= Nempont-Saint-Firmin =

- Commune
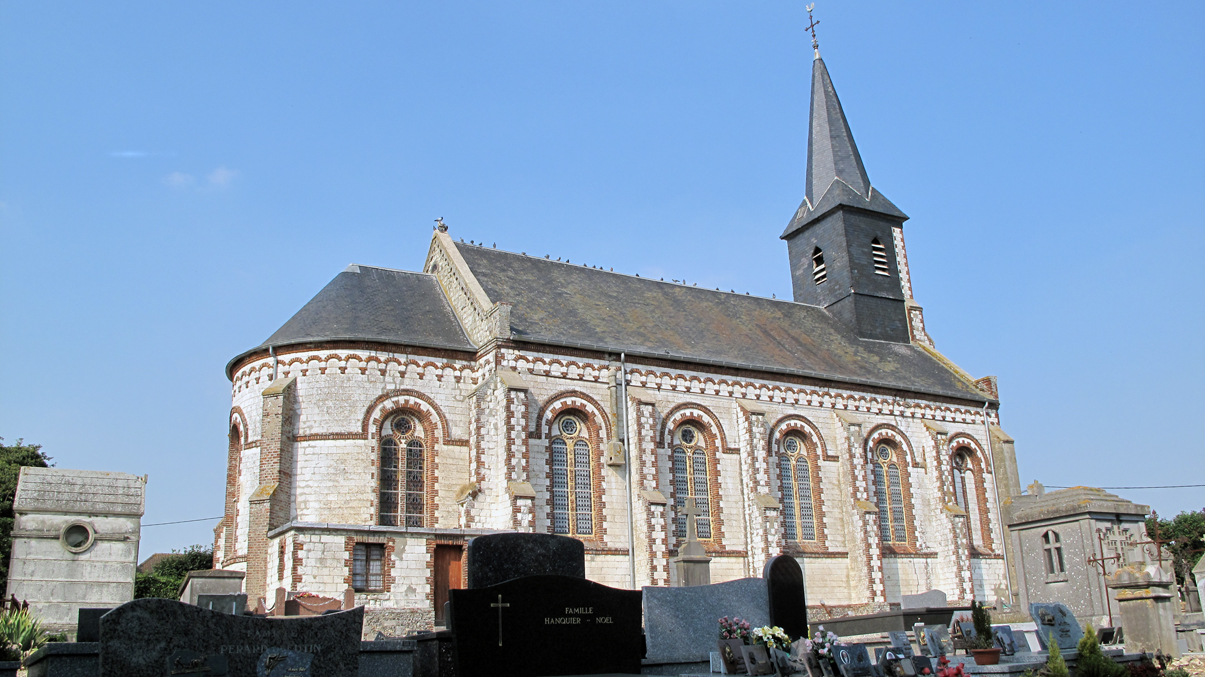
- The church of Nempont-Saint-Firmin

- Coat of arms
- Location of Nempont-Saint-Firmin
- Location within France Location within Hauts-de-France
- Coordinates: 50°21′20″N 1°44′01″E
- Country: France
- Region: Hauts-de-France
- Department: Pas-de-Calais
- Arrondissement: Montreuil
- Canton: Berck
- Intercommunality: CA Deux Baies en Montreuillois

Government
  - Mayor (2020–2026): Thierry Poillet
- Area^{1}: 4.48 km^{2} (1.73 sq mi)
- Elevation: 25 m (82 ft)
- Highest elevation: 53 m (174 ft)
- Lowest elevation: 2 m (6.6 ft)
- Population (2023): 200
  - Density: 45/km^{2} (120/sq mi)
- Time zone: UTC+01:00 (CET)
  - Summer (DST): UTC+02:00 (CEST)
- INSEE/Postal code: 62602 /62180
- ^{1} French Land Register data, which excludes lakes, ponds, glaciers > 1 km^{2} (0.386 sq mi or 247 acres) and river estuaries.

Nempont-Saint-Firmin (French pronunciation: [nɑ̃pɔ̃ sɛ̃ fiʁmɛ̃]) is a commune in the Pas-de-Calais department in the Hauts-de-France region of France in the valley of the Authie river, the border with the department of the Somme, some 8 miles (13 km) south of Montreuil-sur-Mer.

== Population ==
The inhabitants of the town of Nempont-Saint-Firmin are called Nempontois, Nempontoises in French.

Historical population
Year	Pop.	±% p.a.
1968	156	—
1975	158	+0.18%
1982	163	+0.45%
1990	160	−0.23%
1999	166	+0.41%
2007	199	+2.29%
2012	169	−3.22%
2017	198	+3.22%
2023	200	+0.17%
Source: INSEE

== See also ==
- Communes of the Pas-de-Calais department
