= Frohen-sur-Authie =

- Commune
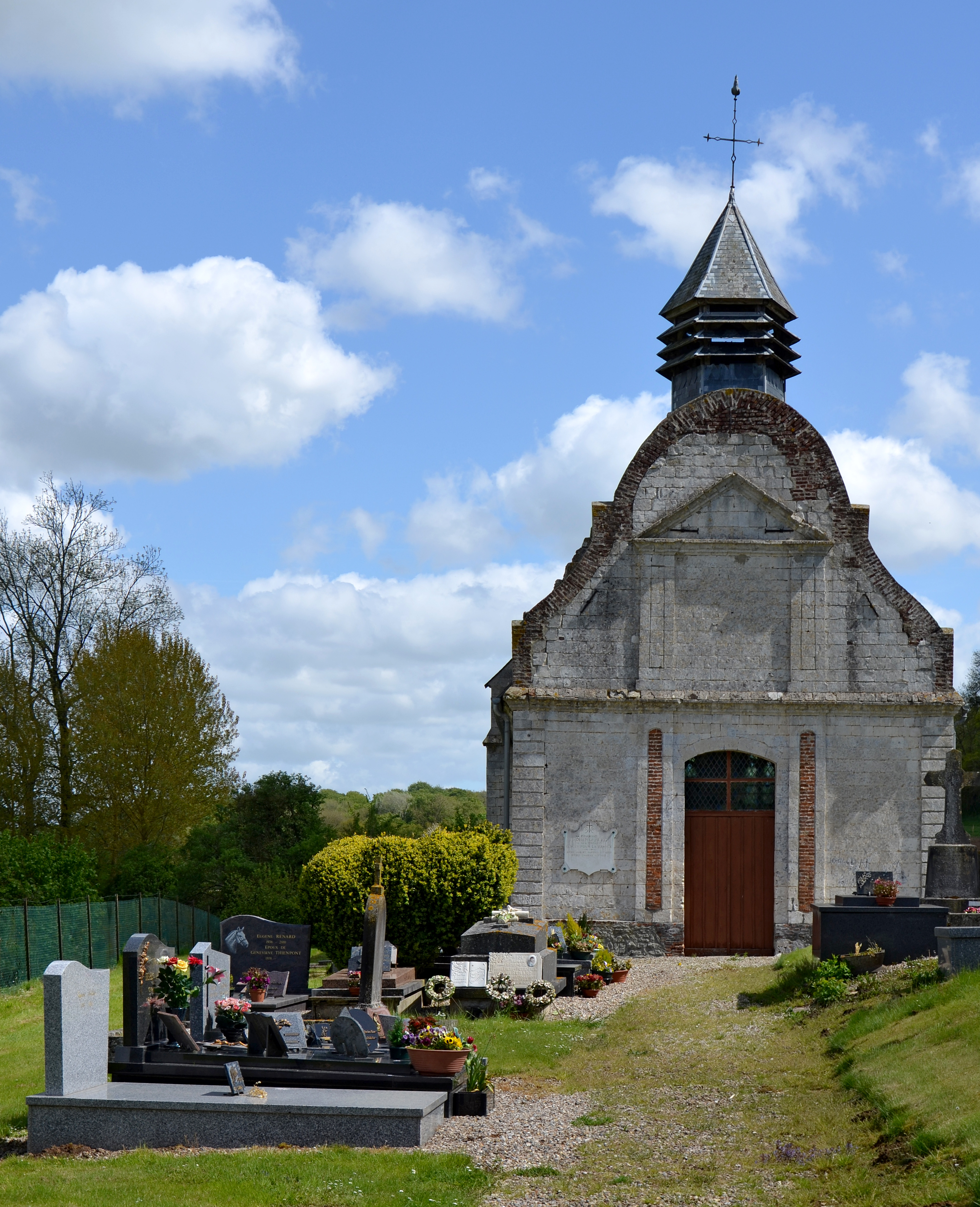
- The church in Frohen-sur-Authie

- Coat of arms
- Location of Frohen-sur-Authie
- Location within France Location within Hauts-de-France
- Coordinates: 50°12′08″N 2°12′23″E
- Country: France
- Region: Hauts-de-France
- Department: Somme
- Arrondissement: Amiens
- Canton: Doullens
- Intercommunality: CC Territoire Nord Picardie

Government
  - Mayor (2020–2026): Jean Pierre Devillers
- Area^{1}: 7.08 km^{2} (2.73 sq mi)
- Highest elevation: 120 m (390 ft)
- Lowest elevation: 39 m (128 ft)
- Population (2023): 244
  - Density: 34.5/km^{2} (89.3/sq mi)
- Time zone: UTC+01:00 (CET)
  - Summer (DST): UTC+02:00 (CEST)
- INSEE/Postal code: 80369 /80370
- ^{1} French Land Register data, which excludes lakes, ponds, glaciers > 1 km^{2} (0.386 sq mi or 247 acres) and river estuaries.

Frohen-sur-Authie (French pronunciation: [fʁɔɑ̃ syʁ oti], literally Frohen on Authie; Picard: Frouhin-su-Eutie) is a commune in the Somme department in Hauts-de-France in northern France.

== Population ==
=== Population development ===
Year	Population
1962	226
1968	212
1975	204
1982	179
1990	171
1999	174
2006	207
2011	229

== Geography ==
The commune is situated on the D938 road, 32 kilometres (20 mi) northeast of Abbeville.

== History ==
The commune was created on the January 1, 2007 by the joining of the two old communes of Frohen-le-Grand and Frohen-le-Petit.

== See also ==
- Communes of the Somme department
