= Authie (river) =

River in northern France

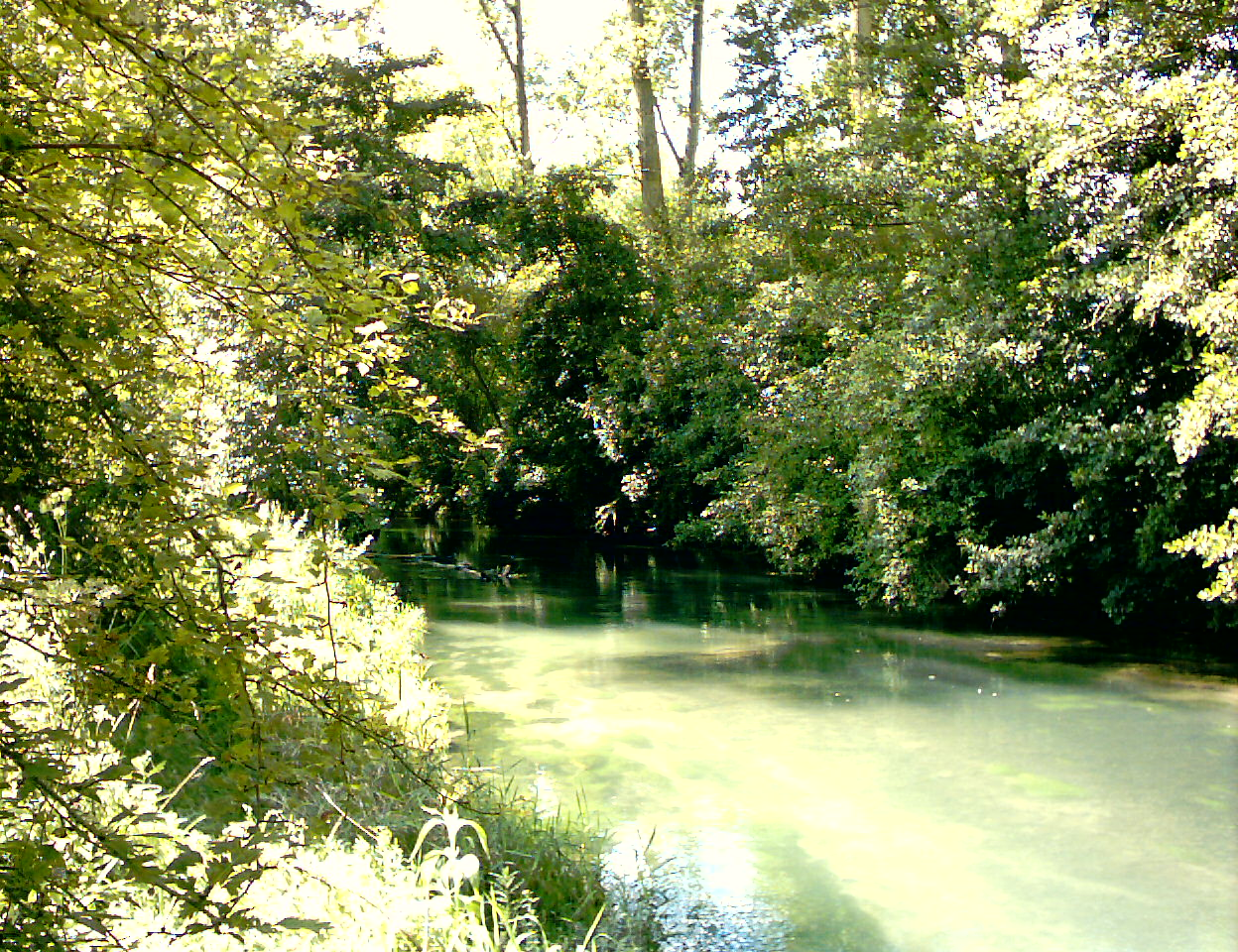
- The Authie at Frohen-sur-Authie

- Native name: Eutie (French)

Location
- Country: France

Physical characteristics
- Source
  - location: Picardie
  - elevation: 131 m (430 ft)
- Mouth
  - location: English Channel
  - coordinates: 50°23′30″N 1°33′40″E
- Length: 108 km (67 mi)
- Basin size: 1,304 km^{2} (503 sq mi)
- Discharge
  - average: 10.8 m^{3}/s (380 cu ft/s)

The Authie (French pronunciation: [o.ti]; Picard: Eutie; (West Flemish: Otie)) is a river in northern France whose 108-kilometre (67 mi) course crosses the departement of the Pas-de-Calais and the Somme. Its source is near the village of Coigneux. It flows through the towns of Doullens, Auxi-le-Château, Nempont-Saint-Firmin and Nampont, finally flowing out into the Channel near Berck.

Its steady flow has attracted mankind for many centuries, developing an agricultural environment that is still dominant today. The valley of the Authie, with many towns, villages, abbeys and chateaux, holds a rich architectural heritage alongside the banks of the river, while the river mouth forms a sizeable bay between Fort-Mahon-Plage and Berck, typical of Picardy estuaries. The area is home to a diverse range of flora and fauna.

== Etymology ==
The origin of the name Authie has not been established with any certainty. A possibility is the pre-Celtic word *atur, meaning "river". It was known in Latin as Alteia.

Many waterways’ names, such as the Adour, originate from the Celtic term alt, meaning "deep" and that could refer to the steep-sided bed of the river. Another suggestion stems from the Latin word attegia designating groups of fishermen and lumberjacks living by any river.

== Geography ==
=== The course of the river ===
The Authie takes its source from Coigneux at an altitude of 131 meters (430 ft), passes by the town of Authie and travels in a west - northwest direction based on the general tectonic orientation of the river currents of the area (Somme, Canche). It receives the intake of its first notable tributary, the Quilliene, at Thièvres. The river then goes to Doullens, where it converges with its main tributary (the Grouche), followed by Auxi-le-Château, and then Argoules and Nampont to the north of the forest of Crécy, before it flows into the English Channel between Fort-Mahon-Plage and Berck. Entering the Marquenterre, as a result of small tributaries, particularly the Fliers, the Authie bends its course towards the southeast, then forms, at Groffliers, an estuary. Its course separates, shortly after Auxi-le-Château, the departments of the Somme and Pas-de-Calais.

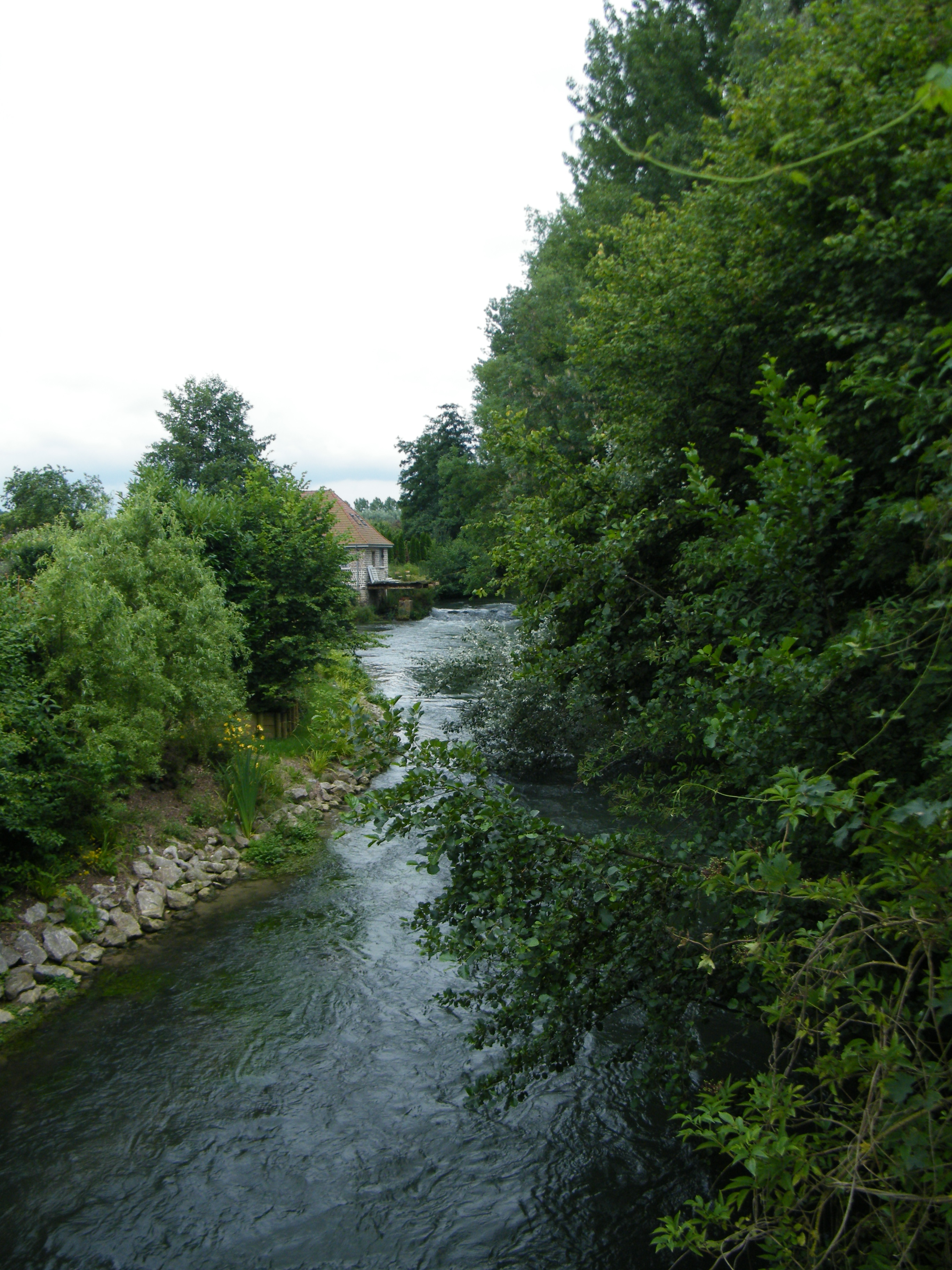
The Authie at Mézerolles

The Authie cuts into the wide plateau sloped towards the west that contains Artois and Ponthieu; a small layer of Pleistocene silt covers the flint clay and a base of chalk. The chalk appears on the slopes of the coastal river valley that cuts into it, while the bottom of the valley is made up of alluvium.

The profile along the river is rather consistent and characterized by a small slope of average (1%), more intense upstream of Doullens (2.3%), and not more than 0.4% downstream of Dompierre-sur-Authie making the Authie a slow flowing stream.

The course of the river can be divided into several parts:

- the upper valley, between the source at Coigneux and the towns of Occoches and Outrebois downstream of Doullens, characterized by a valley bottom habitat and the presence of a sizable amount of wooded cover.
- the middle valley, between the above towns and Dompierre-sur-Authie and Douriez, offers a landscape of poplars. The habitat is located along the river, but also perpendicularly to the river in the many dry small valleys ending up in the main valley.
- the low valley, which runs from Dompierre-sur-Authie to the "dead cliff" near Colline-Beaumont, is noted for the presence of many ponds that had in the past been used for fishing and fish farming. The villages frequently separate from the river and its flood zones, instead sitting at the foot of the hillsides.
- the "lowlands" and the bay of the Authie open on the English Channel between the sandy points of Haut Banc and Routhiauville, behind which the river's estuary has diminished for millennia, advancing towards the north and decreasing the influence of the sea and shipping. In this area, some seawalls, constructed by peasants beginning in the 12th century, have accelerated the natural process and advanced the left (south) bank around 4 kilometers (2.5 miles). The right (north) bank has experienced periods of erosion and accumulation at the discretion of the movements of the river's channel. In order to limit these, a new seawall was erected in 1868, lengthened ten years later, then partially destroyed by the river before being buried under the sands.

=== Watershed ===
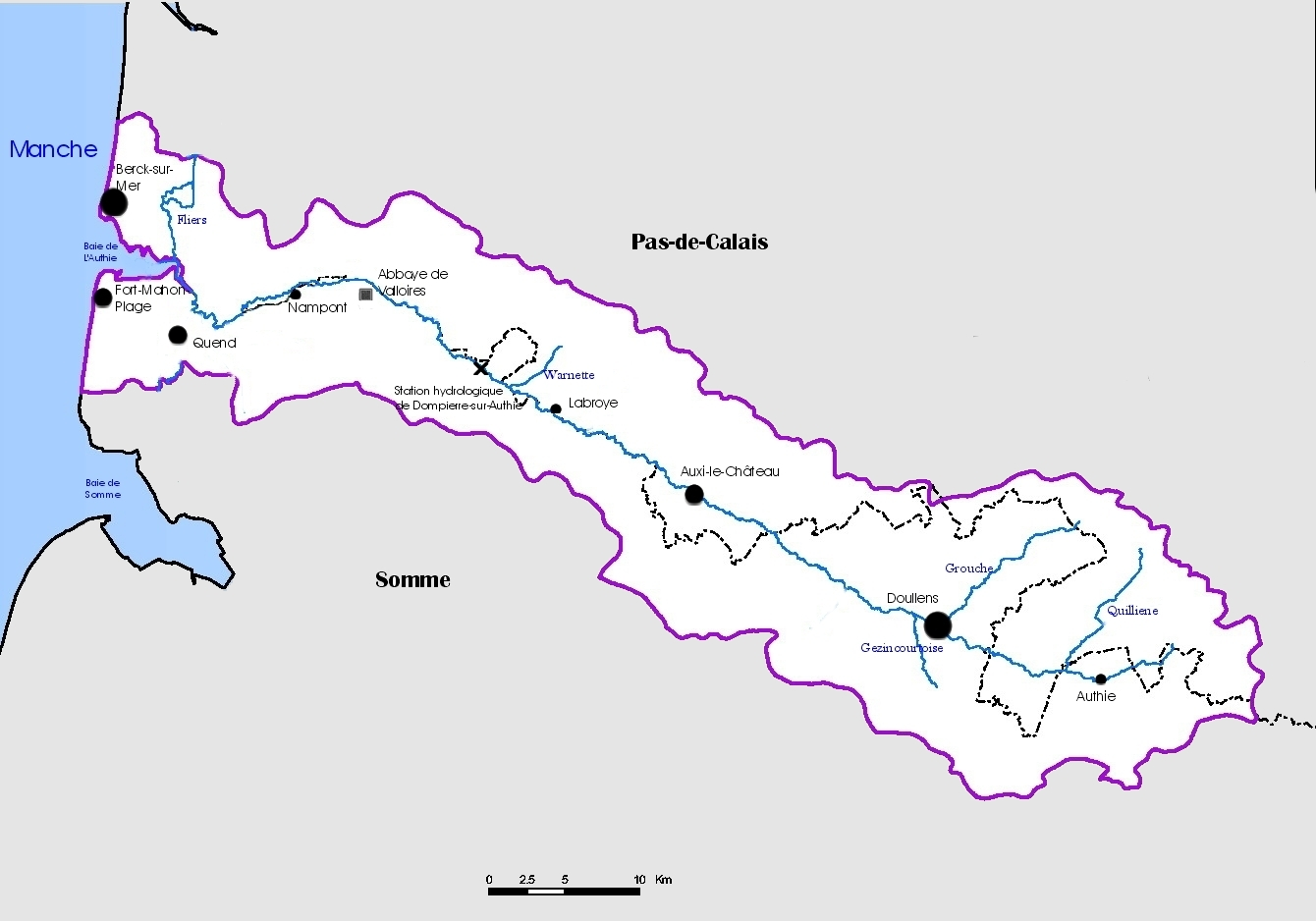
Drainage basin of the Authie

The Authie passes through a single hydrographic zone, which is also called the Authie.

The Authie benefits from an extremely straightforward drainage basin (of 1,305 square kilometers (504 sq mi)) that corresponds to a valley in Artois, where the river collects a symmetrical network of basic tributaries. The valley has an asymmetrical profile, however, with a gentle-sloping right bank contrasting with the steep slope of the left bank. This lack of symmetry is a result of the different sensitivities of the slopes to frost weathering linked to a cycle of freezing and thawing during the periods of Quaternary glaciation. The south- or east-facing slopes are in this way strong sloping as opposed to the mild slopes facing north or west. Upstream of Doullens, this basin stretches beyond the anticlines bordering the valley to the detriment of the basins of the Somme and Canche rivers. In the downstream part of the river, the average width of the river is between 10 and 15 meters (33 and 49 ft). Its average natural slope is 1 in 1000 but it is compensated by the presence of 22 dams.

The full extent of its basin stretches over several regions, with Ponthieu and Amiénois to the south of the river's course, and the areas of Montreuil and Ternois to the north. It covers, wholly or partially, the territory of 156 or 157 towns (73 or 74 in the Somme, 83 in Pas-de-Calais) with a collective 75,200 inhabitants (28,500 in the Somme, 46,700 in Pas-de-Calais), for an average population density of only 57 per km^{2} (149 per square mile). The population density is higher in the valley than the plateaus bordering it. Only six towns located in the basin exceed 2,000 residents.

== Hydrology ==
Monthly figures for the Authie

In the context of an oceanic/pluvial system, the Authie has a uniform and comparatively sustained outflow of 10.8 cubic metres per second (380 cu ft/s) at its outlet. The river flow is affected by the oceanic climate, characterized by an average annual temperature of 10 °C (50 °F), very few days of frost, comparatively high rainfall between 800 and 900 mm (31 and 35 in) per year except near the coast estuary where rainfall is less than 650 mm (25.6 in) per year.

== History ==
The earliest signs of human occupation of the Authie valley come from around 200 to 300,000 years ago, and are associated with the Mousterian. Numerous tools of the Neanderthal era have been discovered. If the valley was inhabited in the Gallic period (jewelry, weapons, and coins have been discovered at Dompierre-sur-Authie in a sanctuary of the pre-Roman era), or while it was part of Gallia Belgica, the course of the Authie remains away from large population movements. The lanes of communication do not follow the valley from east to west but instead cross it north to south, including the tin road that connected what is now the port of Boulogne-sur-Mer to southern France before the period of Roman occupation as well as the Roman roads securing contact between Lutetia (Paris), Samarobriva (Amiens), and the English Channel through the port of Gesoriacum (Boulogne-sur-Mer). Aerial investigations and archeological excavations have led to the rediscovery of many large Gallo-Roman farms (villa rustica), especially in Nampont, but urban areas with large groups of people have not been discovered.

In 1272, Jean de Nesle, husband of Joan, Countess of Ponthieu, envisioned the digging of a canal from the bay of the Authie to Rue, whose port had begun to silt up. The project faced with difficulties, work is not begun and the idea of a canal is abandoned in 1277.

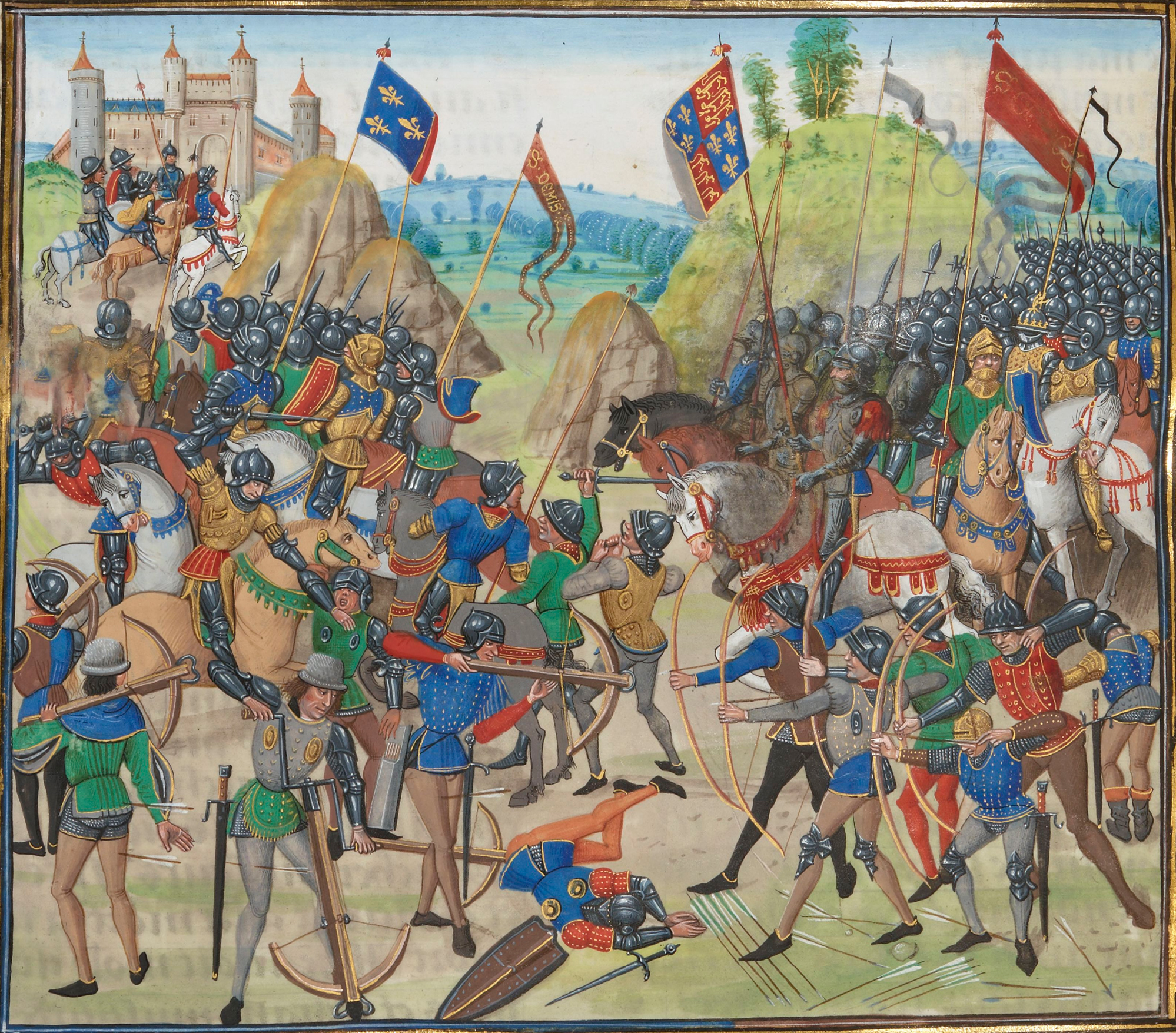
A 15th century depiction of the Battle of Crécy

Starting with the Battle of Crécy during the Hundred Years' War, the valley of the Authie became a place of confrontation and a vital issue in the battles of nations. In the 16th century, in the course of the conflict between France and the Habsburgs of Austria and Spain, the Authie became the border between the French, who retained Picardy, and the Spanish in Artois after the signings of the Treaty of Madrid on January 14, 1526, and the second Treaty of Cateau-Cambrésis on April 3, 1559. The course of the river is covered with powerful fortresses, French in the south, Spanish in the north. In the first half of the 17th century, the area again served as a battlefield during the Thirty Years' War until 1648, and the war between France and Spain until 1659. At the end of the latter, the Treaty of the Pyrenees, signed November 7, 1659, returned Artois to France, costing the Authie its border status. Due to the many combats that took place in the valley, the requisitions of the armies led to the destruction of many buildings and villages and drove the inhabitants to arrange muches, or underground shelters. These were established near, or more often beneath, their villages where they were able to take refuge with their possessions and livestock in case of danger. The entrance was often located in the church, with the muche located under the village square, consisting of passages and rooms for housing families with their animals, provisions, and all the wealth that each possessed. Several dozens have been listed in the Somme and Pas-de-Calais.

With Artois returned to France, the Authie still remained an administrative boundary between provinces of different fiscal status. To the north of the river, various taxes such as the gabelle and taille are not applied, which leads to smuggling by residents of Picardy looking to buy cheaper salt. Boundary problems do not end with the fall of the Ancien Régime and the establishment of the departments by the French Revolution, as from 1790 to 1791, Auxi-le-Château remained divided in two, between the Somme and Pas-de-Calais before becoming part of the latter.

In the 19th century, new means of communication like the railroad largely avoided the valley of the Authie. No railroad track, even of local interest, was established along the length of the river. The major roads and railroad axes in the area simply with crossing over the river. Only departmental roads run alongside the waterway, with the D 319 to the north and D 224 to the south, and even these move away near the estuary. The valley offers a low density of transport networks compared to its northern counterparts, particularly the Aa.

== Departements and communes traversed ==
- Pas-de-Calais (62) : Beauvoir-Wavans, Auxi-le-Château, Labroye, Groffliers, Nempont-Saint-Firmin and Berck.
- Somme (80): Coigneux, Authie, Authieule, Doullens, Hem-Hardinval, Boufflers, Dompierre-sur-Authie, Argoules, Nampont, Quend and Fort-Mahon-Plage.

== Annexes ==
=== Bibliography ===
- Gérard Bacquet, Val d'Authie, Ed. Château, Auxi-le-Château, 1975 ASIN B0000DP6VS
- Eric Alibert, La Côte d'Opale, Carnet du Littoral, Gallimard - Conservatoire du littoral, 1998 ISBN 2-07-051467-6
