= Auxi-le-Château =

- Commune
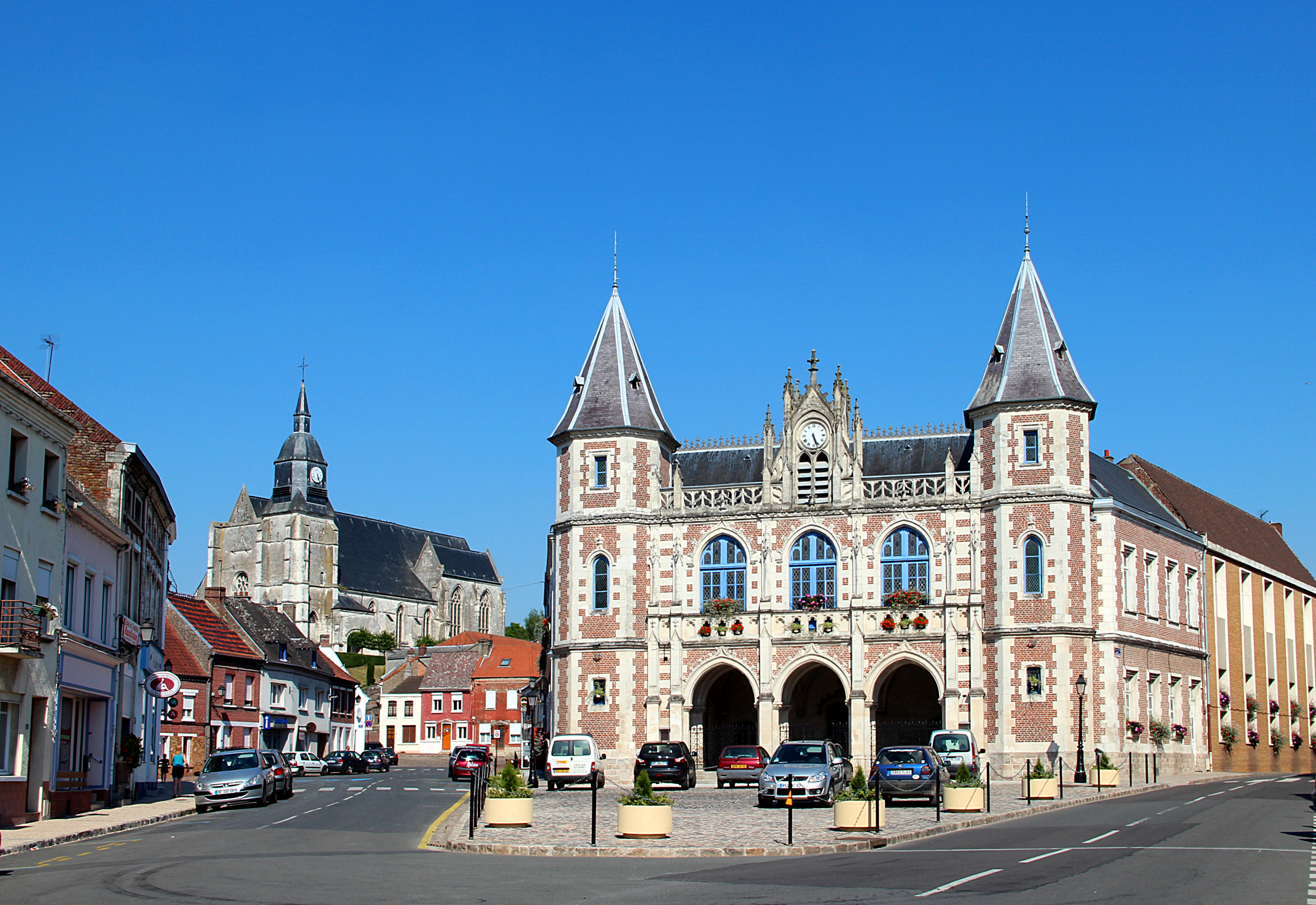
- The town centre of Auxi-le-Château

- Coat of arms
- Location of Auxi-le-Château
- Location within France Location within Hauts-de-France
- Coordinates: 50°13′53″N 2°06′56″E
- Country: France
- Region: Hauts-de-France
- Department: Pas-de-Calais
- Arrondissement: Arras
- Canton: Auxi-le-Château
- Intercommunality: CC du Ternois

Government
  - Mayor (2020–2026): Henri Dejonghe
- Area^{1}: 27.08 km^{2} (10.46 sq mi)
- Elevation: 34 m (112 ft)
- Highest elevation: 138 m (453 ft)
- Lowest elevation: 25 m (82 ft)
- Population (2023): 2,547
  - Density: 94.05/km^{2} (243.6/sq mi)
- Time zone: UTC+01:00 (CET)
  - Summer (DST): UTC+02:00 (CEST)
- INSEE/Postal code: 62060 /62390
- ^{1} French Land Register data, which excludes lakes, ponds, glaciers > 1 km^{2} (0.386 sq mi or 247 acres) and river estuaries.

Auxi-le-Château (French pronunciation: [oksi lə ʃɑto]; Picard: Aussi-ch’Catiau) is a commune in the Pas-de-Calais department in northern France.

== Geography ==
A farming town located 28 miles (45 km) west south west of Arras at the junction of the D938, D933 and D941 roads. The Authie river flows through the town, which once divided the commune into two parts, one in the Pas-de-Calais and the other in the Somme department. It is so named because it was a border fort, but there is now no sign of a castle, apart from some ruins at the top of the Chemin de la Belle Inutile.

== Population ==
Historical population
Year	Pop.	±% p.a.
1968	3,099	—
1975	3,229	+0.59%
1982	3,187	−0.19%
1990	3,051	−0.54%
1999	3,065	+0.05%
2007	2,956	−0.45%
2012	2,829	−0.87%
2017	2,639	−1.38%
2023	2,547	−0.59%
Source: INSEE

== History ==
Until the abolition of the Provinces of France in 1791, Auxi-le-Château was part of the province of Picardy.

== Sights ==
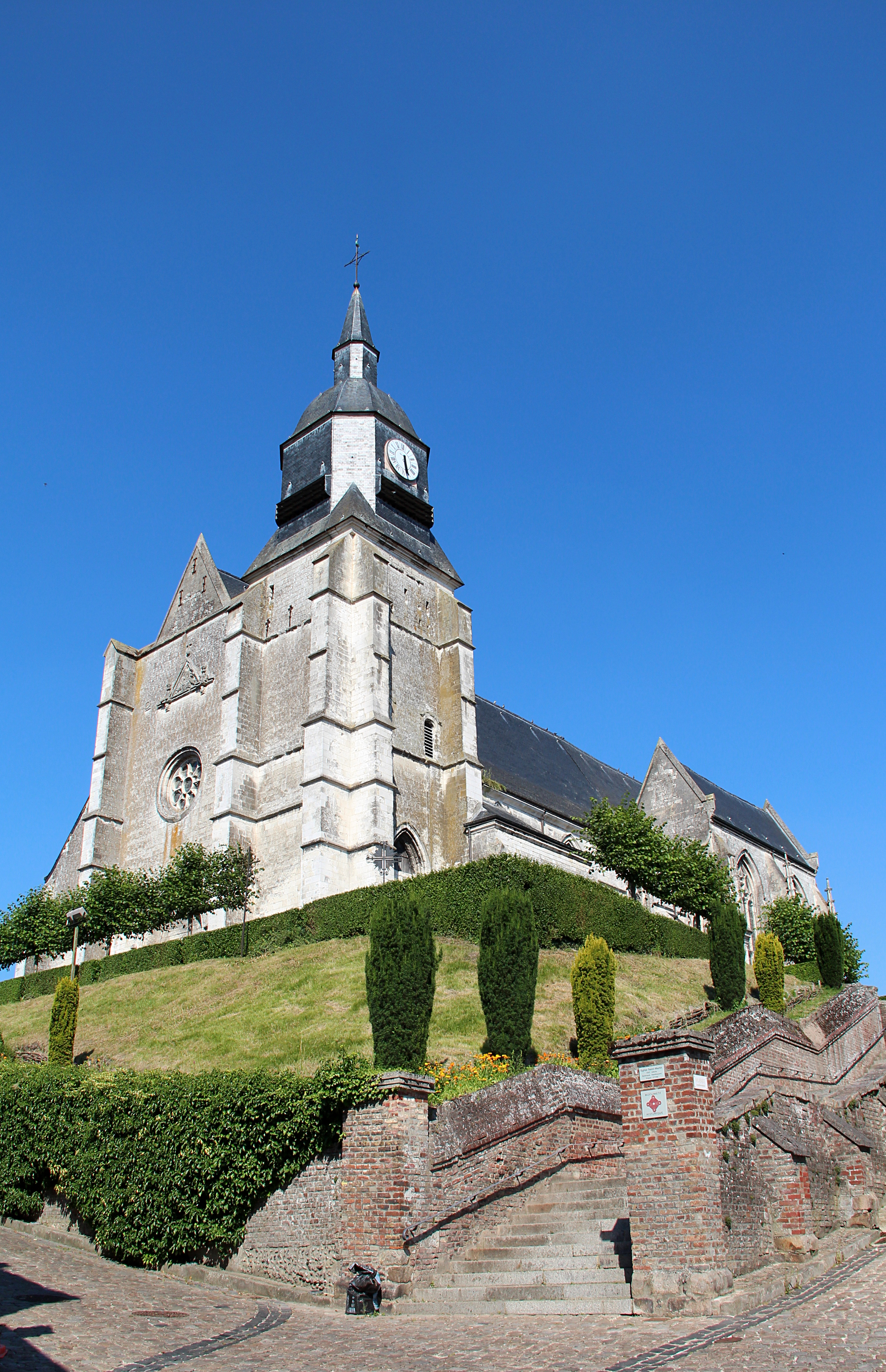
The Saint Martin's church (16th century).

- The Flamboyant Gothic Saint Martin's church (16th century)
- The neo-Gothic Town Hall.
- The ruins of a 12th-century castle.
- Seventeenth- and eighteenth-century houses.
- Watermills.
- The Museum of Arts and Folklife, in a former rectory.
- Two 19th-century chapels.

== See also ==
- Communes of the Pas-de-Calais department
