= Frohen-le-Petit =

Coordinates: 50.1962°N 2.2002°E

Location of Frohen-le-Petit in France

Frohen-le-Petit (French pronunciation: [fʁɔɑ̃ lə pəti]) is a former commune in the Somme département in the Picardie region of France. Since 1 January 2007, Frohen-le-Petit and Frohen-le-Grand have combined into the new commune of Frohen-sur-Authie.

== Geography ==
Situated on the D938 road, some 20 miles (32 km) northeast of Abbeville.

== Population ==
Historical population
| Year | Pop. | ±% p.a. |
|---|---|---|
| 1962 | 49 | — |
| 1968 | 47 | −0.69% |
| 1975 | 42 | −1.59% |
| 1982 | 33 | −3.39% |
| 1990 | 30 | −1.18% |
| 1999 | 25 | −2.01% |
| 2006 | 25 | +0.00% |
Source: EHESS
