= Quend =

- Commune
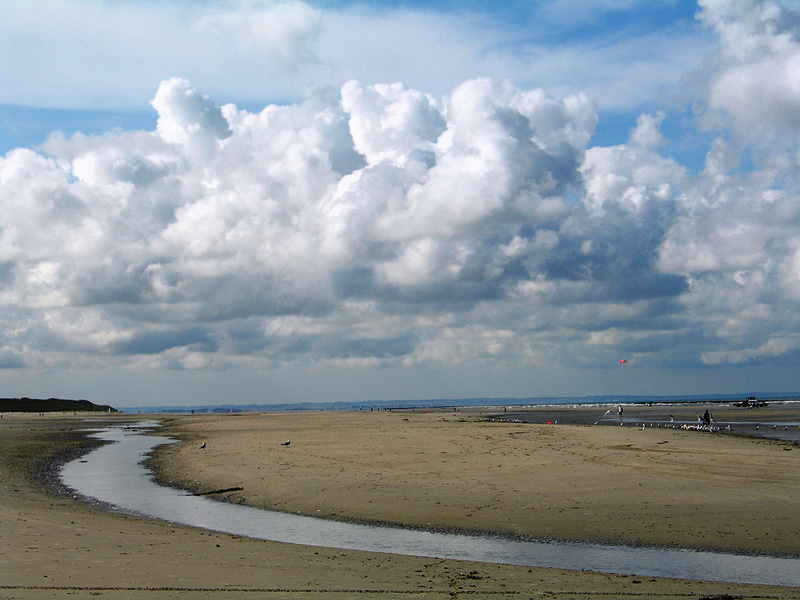
- The beach at Quend-Plage

- Coat of arms
- Location of Quend
- Location within France Location within Hauts-de-France
- Coordinates: 50°19′02″N 1°38′14″E
- Country: France
- Region: Hauts-de-France
- Department: Somme
- Arrondissement: Abbeville
- Canton: Rue
- Intercommunality: CC Ponthieu-Marquenterre

Government
  - Mayor (2020–2026): Marc Volant
- Area^{1}: 37.78 km^{2} (14.59 sq mi)
- Elevation: 5 m (16 ft)
- Highest elevation: 29 m (95 ft)
- Lowest elevation: 2 m (6.6 ft)
- Population (2023): 1,280
  - Density: 33.9/km^{2} (87.7/sq mi)
- Time zone: UTC+01:00 (CET)
  - Summer (DST): UTC+02:00 (CEST)
- INSEE/Postal code: 80649 /80120
- ^{1} French Land Register data, which excludes lakes, ponds, glaciers > 1 km^{2} (0.386 sq mi or 247 acres) and river estuaries.

Quend (French pronunciation: [kɛ̃]; West Flemish: Kent) is a commune in the Somme department in Hauts-de-France in northern France. The inhabitants are known as Quennois. Also, Quend is the northernmost commune of the Somme Department.

== Geography ==
Quend is situated between the estuaries of the Somme and the Authie, with the D940 connecting to the A16 motorway. Quend is a commune of several villages and hamlets (Monchaux, Routhiauville, Quend-Plage-Les-Pins and more).

== History ==
Quend's church is dedicated to Saint Vaast, bishop of Arras in the 6th century. The steeple, which can be seen from miles around, was used as a triangulation point when creating the map of France. On 15 March 1905, lightning struck the steeple.

Quend-Plage-Les-Pins was razed during the Allied invasion of France in 1944.

== Population ==
Historical population
Year	Pop.	±% p.a.
1968	1,345	—
1975	1,315	−0.32%
1982	1,243	−0.80%
1990	1,209	−0.35%
1999	1,205	−0.04%
2007	1,387	+1.77%
2012	1,398	+0.16%
2017	1,396	−0.03%
2023	1,280	−1.44%
Source: INSEE

== Tourism and culture ==
Since 2005, A film festival has taken place at Quend-Plage-les-Pins.

== Places and monuments ==
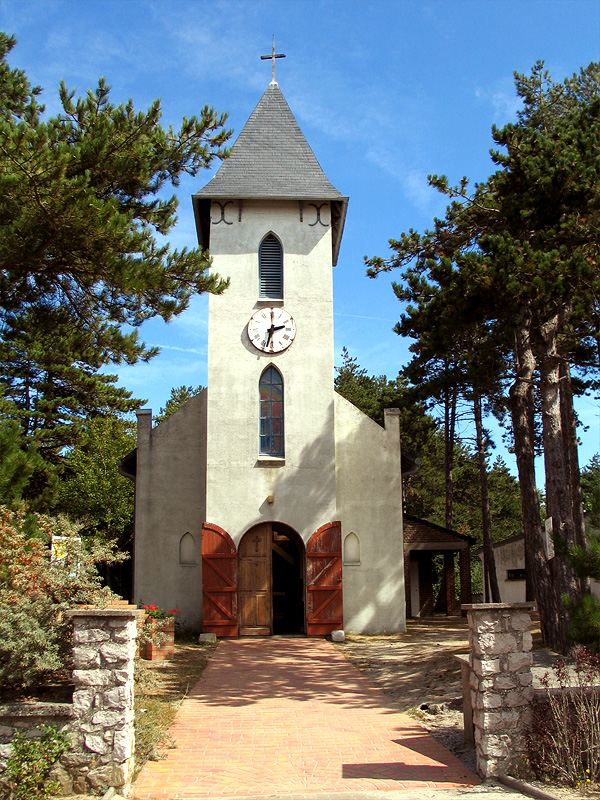
The chapel at Quend-Plage

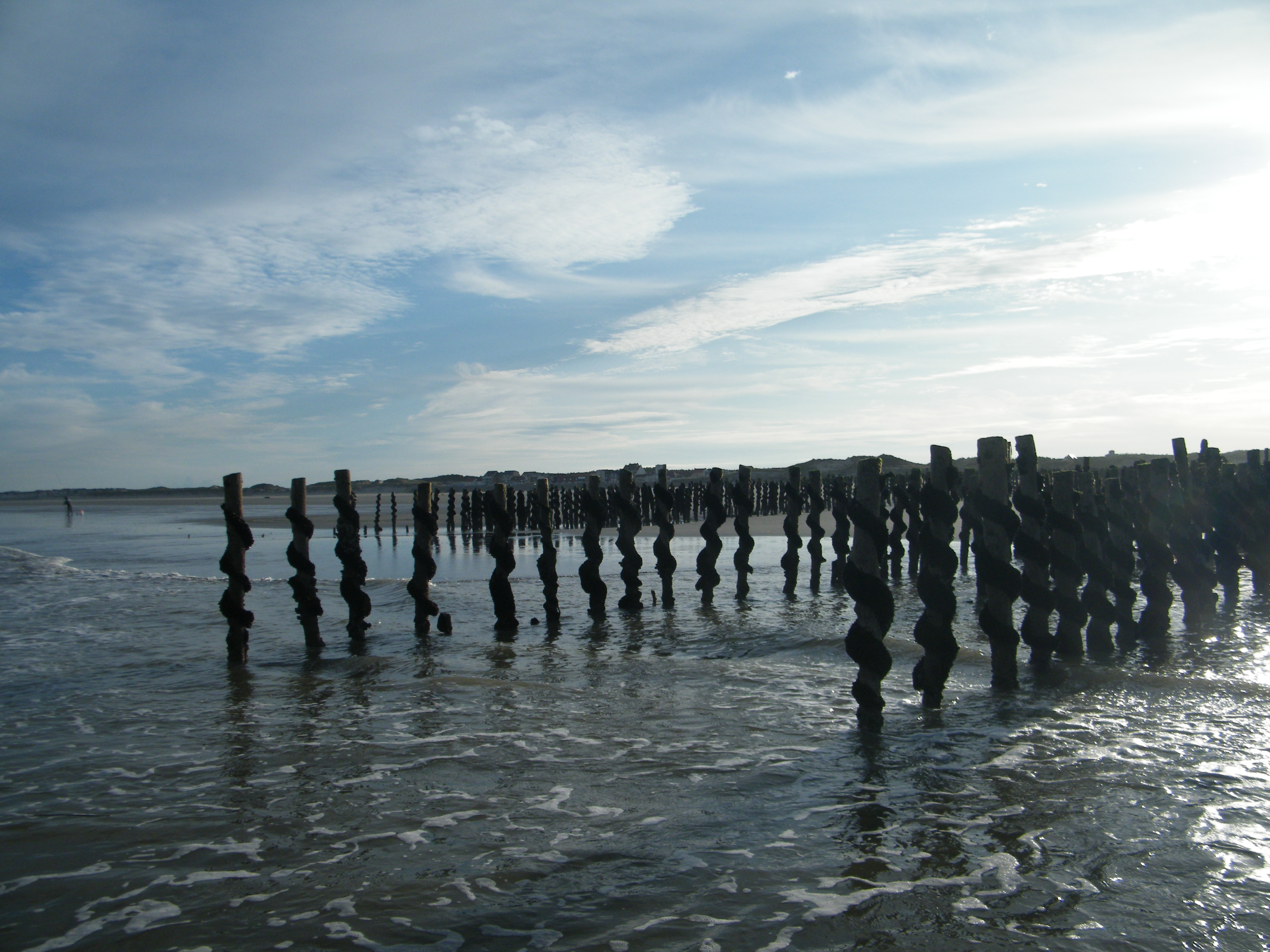
Mussel culture.

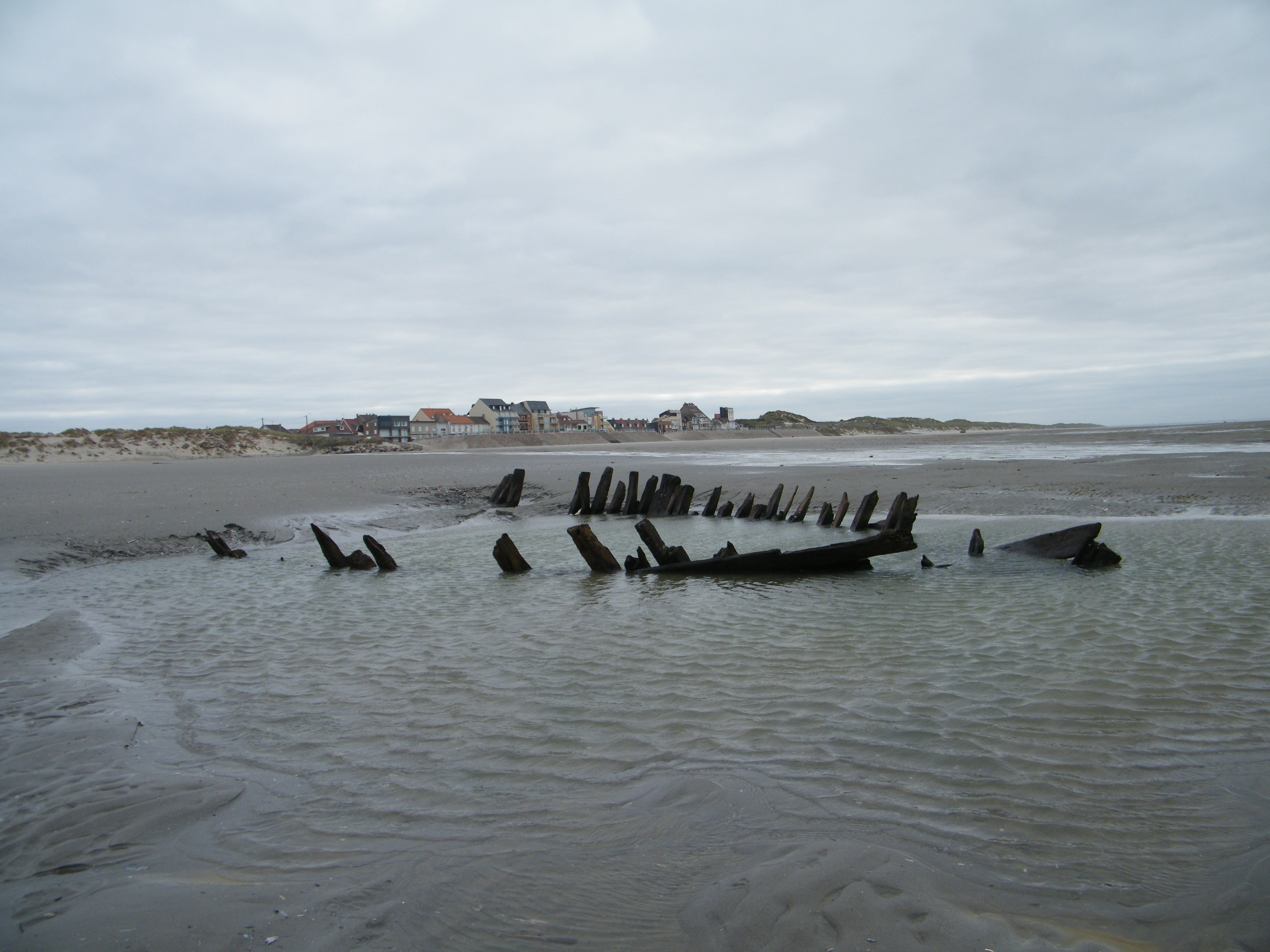
Wrecked.

== Personalities ==
- Roger Noyon, artiste

== See also ==
- Communes of the Somme department
