= Communauté de communes du Saint-Polois =

Coordinates: 50.3799°N 2.3361°E

Saint-Polois
- Former communauté de communes
- Interactive map of Saint-Polois
- Country: France
- Region: Hauts-de-France
- Department: Pas-de-Calais
- No. of communes: {{{nbcomm}}}
- Established: 1996
- Disbanded: 2013
- Area: 223 km^{2} (86 sq mi)
- Population (2009): 15,553
  - Density: 69.7/km^{2} (181/sq mi)

The Communauté de communes du Saint-Polois was located in the Pas-de-Calais département, in northern France. It was created in January 1996. In January 2013 it was merged into the new Communauté de communes des Vertes Collines du Saint-Polois, which was merged into the new Communauté de communes du Ternois in January 2017.

== Composition ==
It comprised the following 43 communes:

1. Averdoingt
2. Beauvois
3. Bermicourt
4. Blangerval-Blangermont
5. Brias
6. Buneville
7. Croisette
8. Croix-en-Ternois
9. Écoivres
10. Flers
11. Foufflin-Ricametz
12. Framecourt
13. Gauchin-Verloingt
14. Gouy-en-Ternois
15. Guinecourt
16. Hautecloque
17. Héricourt
18. Herlin-le-Sec
19. Herlincourt
20. Hernicourt
21. Humerœuille
22. Humières
23. Ligny-Saint-Flochel
24. Linzeux
25. Maisnil
26. Marquay
27. Moncheaux-lès-Frévent
28. Monchy-Breton
29. Monts-en-Ternois
30. Neuville-au-Cornet
31. Œuf-en-Ternois
32. Ostreville
33. Pierremont
34. Ramecourt
35. Roëllecourt
36. Saint-Michel-sur-Ternoise
37. Saint-Pol-sur-Ternoise
38. Séricourt
39. Sibiville
40. Siracourt
41. Ternas
42. Troisvaux
43. Wavrans-sur-Ternoise
