= Canton of Heuchin =

Coordinates: 50°28′24″N 2°19′13″E

Heuchin
- Former canton
- Interactive map of Heuchin
- Country: France
- Region: Hauts-de-France
- Department: Pas-de-Calais
- No. of communes: {{{nbcomm}}}
- Disbanded: 2015
- Area: 187.45 km^{2} (72.37 sq mi)
- Population (2012): 11,001
  - Density: 58.688/km^{2} (152.00/sq mi)

The Canton of Heuchin is a former canton situated in the department of the Pas-de-Calais and in the Nord-Pas-de-Calais region of northern France. It was disbanded following the French canton reorganisation which came into effect in March 2015. It consisted of 32 communes, which joined the canton of Saint-Pol-sur-Ternoise in 2015. It had a total of 11,001 inhabitants (2012).

== Geography ==
The canton is organised around Heuchin in the arrondissement of Arras. The altitude varies from 42m (Tilly-Capelle) to 196 m (Fiefs) for n average altitude of 111m.

The canton of Heuchin included the following communes:

- Anvin
- Aumerval
- Bailleul-lès-Pernes
- Bergueneuse
- Bours
- Boyaval
- Conteville-en-Ternois
- Eps
- Équirre
- Érin
- Fiefs
- Fleury
- Floringhem
- Fontaine-lès-Boulans
- Fontaine-lès-Hermans
- Hestrus
- Heuchin
- Huclier
- Lisbourg
- Marest
- Monchy-Cayeux
- Nédon
- Nédonchel
- Pernes
- Prédefin
- Pressy
- Sachin
- Sains-lès-Pernes
- Tangry
- Teneur
- Tilly-Capelle
- Valhuon

== History ==
List of the successive conseillers généraux (members of the general council)
Date of election	Name	Party	Background
2001	Charles Delaire	.	.
2004	Alain Wacheux	.	.
Members are elected for six years in three-yearly elections.

== See also ==
- Cantons of Pas-de-Calais
- Communes of Pas-de-Calais
- Arrondissements of the Pas-de-Calais department
