= Ramecourt =

Ramecourt is the name of two communes in France:

- Ramecourt, Pas-de-Calais
- Ramecourt, Vosges
