= Érin =

- Commune
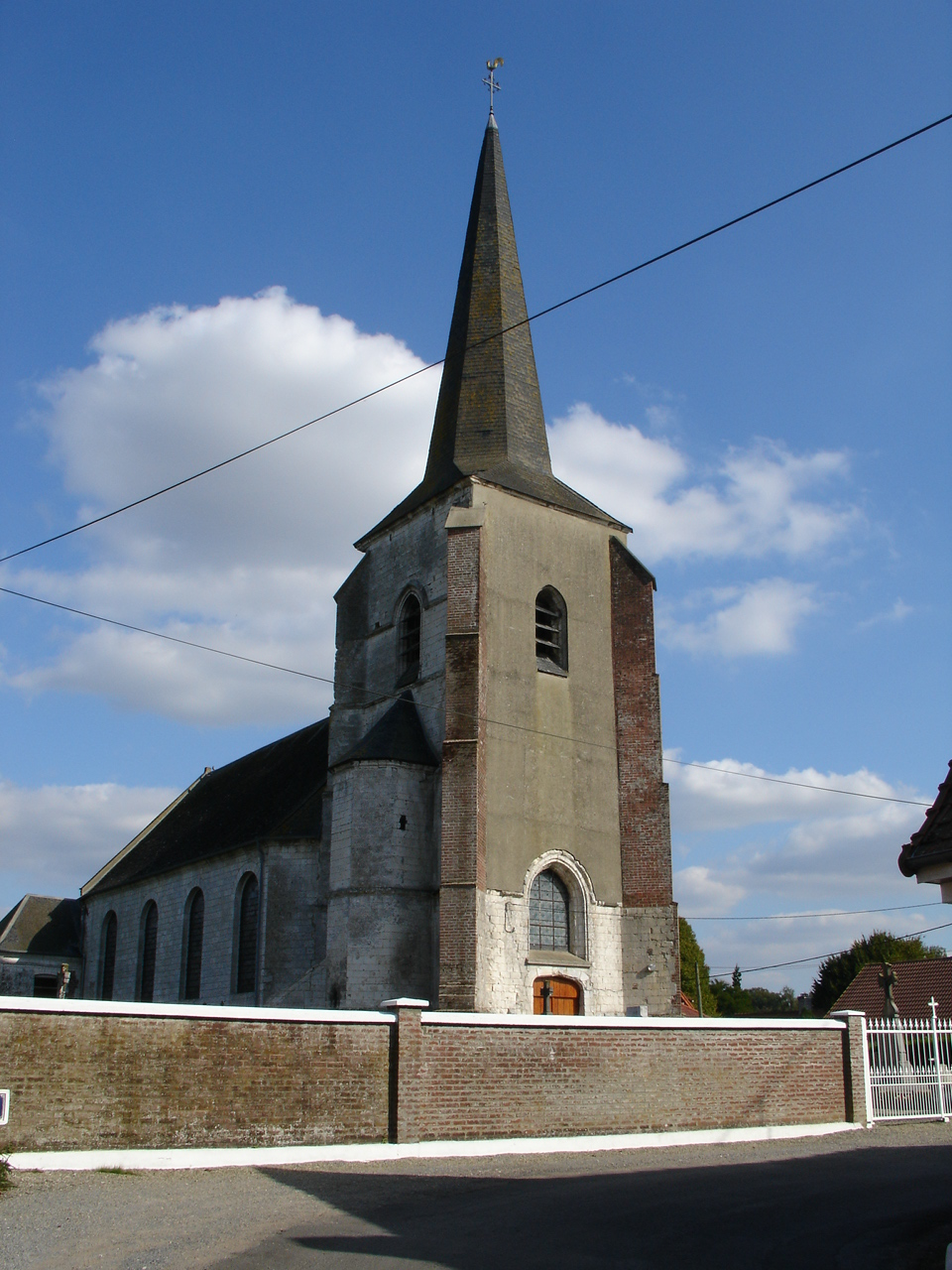
- The church of Érin

- Coat of arms
- Location of Érin
- Location within France Location within Hauts-de-France
- Coordinates: 50°26′23″N 2°12′38″E
- Country: France
- Region: Hauts-de-France
- Department: Pas-de-Calais
- Arrondissement: Arras
- Canton: Saint-Pol-sur-Ternoise
- Intercommunality: CC Ternois

Government
  - Mayor (2020–2026): Cédric Leclercq
- Area^{1}: 6.36 km^{2} (2.46 sq mi)
- Population (2023): 221
  - Density: 34.7/km^{2} (90.0/sq mi)
- Time zone: UTC+01:00 (CET)
  - Summer (DST): UTC+02:00 (CEST)
- INSEE/Postal code: 62303 /62134
- ^{1} French Land Register data, which excludes lakes, ponds, glaciers > 1 km^{2} (0.386 sq mi or 247 acres) and river estuaries.

Érin (French pronunciation: [eʁɛ̃]) is a commune in the Pas-de-Calais department in the Hauts-de-France region in France.

== Situation ==
Érin is a small village on the south side of the small river, the Ternoise which flows through St.Pol-sur-Ternoise and joins the River Canche at Hesdin. The geology of the area is like that of the Somme valley to its south. The Ternoise valley is the most northerly flowing in the syncline to the south of the Variscan front. The London-Brabant Massif underlies the land to the north.

== Communications ==
The road, D94 follows the river between St.Pol and Hesdin. Alongside it runs the Arras to Boulogne-sur-Mer railway.

== History ==
During the First World War, the principal depôt of the British Army unit, then known as the Tank Corps, developed at Érin. The Tank Corps developed through the Heavy branch of the Machine Gun Corps from the Heavy Section. This was founded in March 1916. The depôt was known as the Central Workshops and was set up in January 1917 under the command of Major Brockbank. Other parts of the organization were nearer the neighbouring villages of Bermicourt (maintenance school) and Fleury (wireless and signals).

== See also ==
- Communes of the Pas-de-Calais department
