= Hautecloque =

Hautecloque may refer to:

- Philippe Leclerc de Hauteclocque (1902–1947), French general during World War II
- Hautecloque, Pas-de-Calais, France
