= Fontaine-lès-Hermans =

- Commune
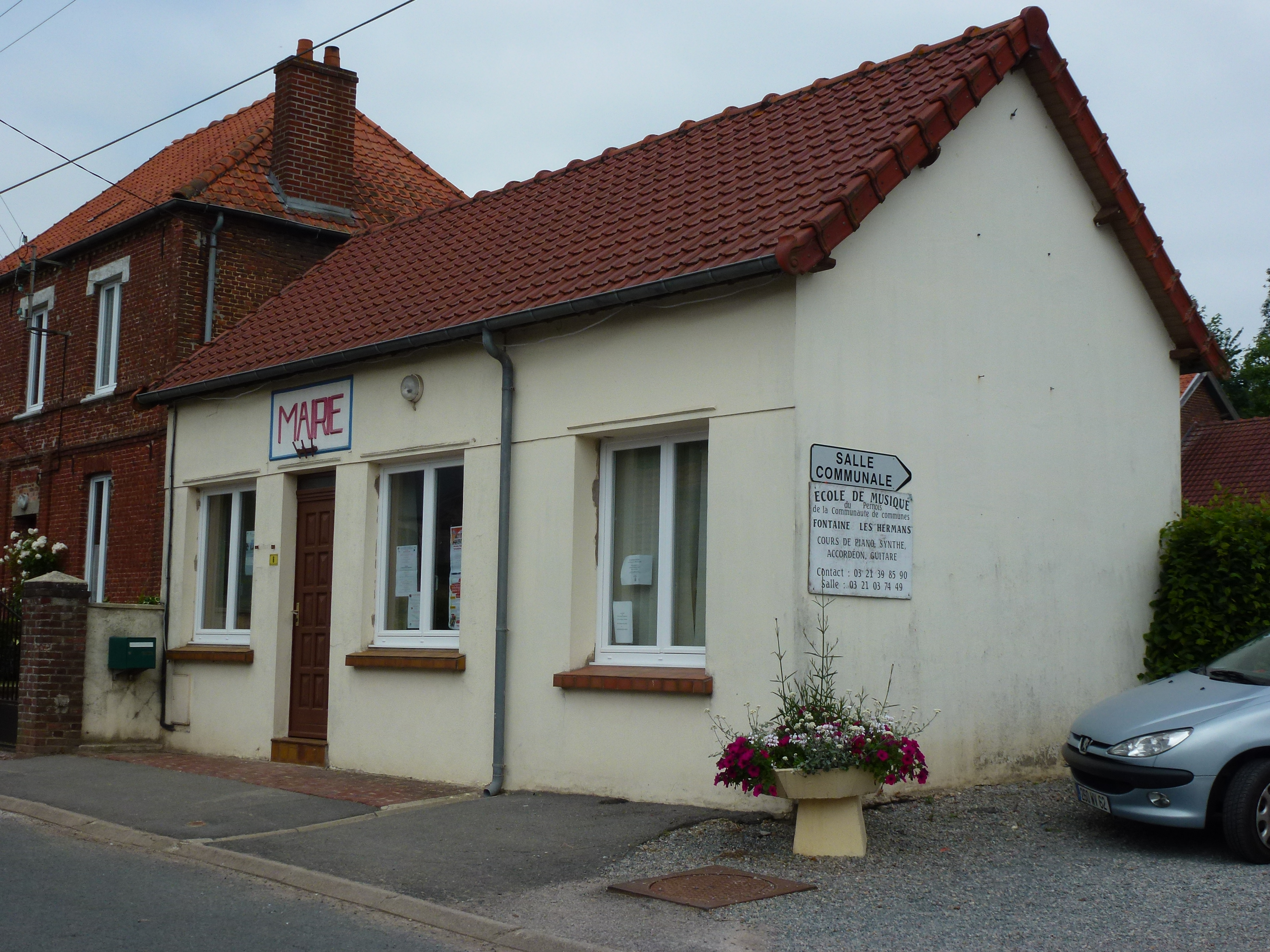
- The town hall of Fontaine-lès-Hermans

- Coat of arms
- Location of Fontaine-lès-Hermans
- Location within France Location within Hauts-de-France
- Coordinates: 50°31′38″N 2°21′00″E
- Country: France
- Region: Hauts-de-France
- Department: Pas-de-Calais
- Arrondissement: Arras
- Canton: Saint-Pol-sur-Ternoise
- Intercommunality: CC Ternois

Government
  - Mayor (2020–2026): Eric Pomart
- Area^{1}: 3.8 km^{2} (1.5 sq mi)
- Elevation: 110 m (360 ft)
- Highest elevation: 189 m (620 ft)
- Lowest elevation: 99 m (325 ft)
- Population (2023): 105
  - Density: 28/km^{2} (72/sq mi)
- Time zone: UTC+01:00 (CET)
  - Summer (DST): UTC+02:00 (CEST)
- INSEE/Postal code: 62344 /62550
- ^{1} French Land Register data, which excludes lakes, ponds, glaciers > 1 km^{2} (0.386 sq mi or 247 acres) and river estuaries.

Fontaine-lès-Hermans is a commune in the Pas-de-Calais department in the Hauts-de-France region of France.

== Geography ==
The commune is a small farming village situated 27 miles (43 km) northwest of Arras, on the D69 road. The largest nearby city is Bruay-la-Buissière, which is located 15 km southeast of the commune. It is surrounded by the communes Nédonchel, Westrehem and Fiefs.

== Population ==
The inhabitants of the commune of Fontaine-lès-Hermans are referred to as Hermanifontains or Hermanifontaines (males or females) in French.

Historical population
Year	Pop.	±% p.a.
1968	109	—
1975	96	−1.80%
1982	84	−1.89%
1990	112	+3.66%
1999	101	−1.14%
2007	106	+0.61%
2012	117	+1.99%
2017	108	−1.59%
2023	105	−0.47%
Source: INSEE

== Places of interest ==
- St. Clement Church, which dates from the seventeenth century

== See also ==
- Communes of the Pas-de-Calais department
