= Vacquerie-le-Boucq =

Commune in northern France

- Commune
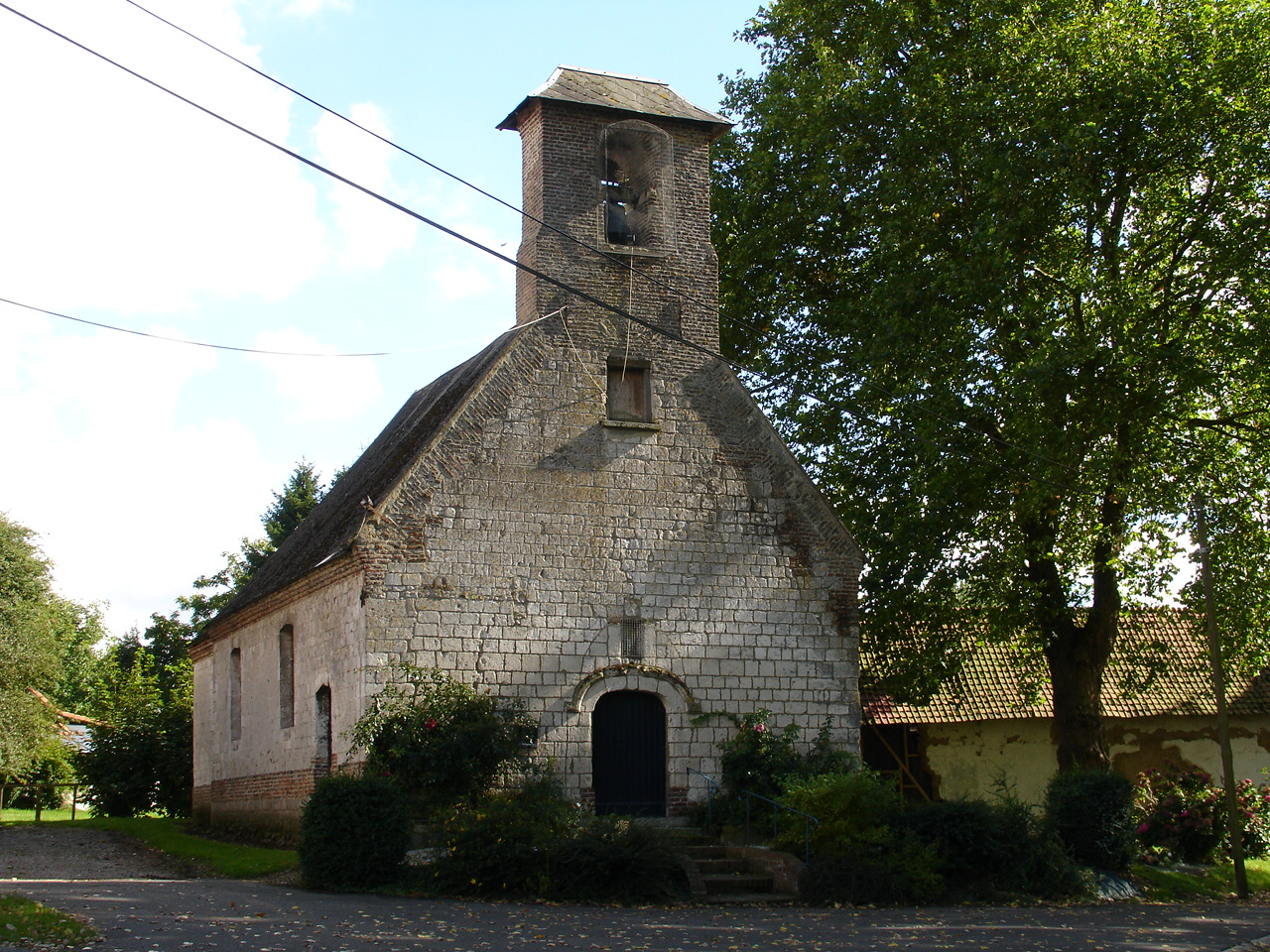
- The church of Vacquerie-le-Boucq
- Location of Vacquerie-le-Boucq
- Location within France Location within Hauts-de-France
- Coordinates: 50°16′N 2°13′E
- Country: France
- Region: Hauts-de-France
- Department: Pas-de-Calais
- Arrondissement: Arras
- Canton: Saint-Pol-sur-Ternoise
- Intercommunality: Ternois

Government
  - Mayor (2020–2026): Hugues Belvas
- Area^{1}: 3.3 km^{2} (1.3 sq mi)
- Elevation: 129 m (423 ft)
- Highest elevation: 141 m (463 ft)
- Lowest elevation: 100 m (330 ft)
- Population (2023): 67
  - Density: 20/km^{2} (53/sq mi)
- Time zone: UTC+01:00 (CET)
  - Summer (DST): UTC+02:00 (CEST)
- INSEE/Postal code: 62833 /62270
- ^{1} French Land Register data, which excludes lakes, ponds, glaciers > 1 km^{2} (0.386 sq mi or 247 acres) and river estuaries.

Vacquerie-le-Boucq (French pronunciation: [vakʁi lə buk]) is a commune in the Pas-de-Calais department in the Hauts-de-France region of France 29 miles (47 km) west of Arras.

== Population ==
Historical population
Year	Pop.	±% p.a.
1968	130	—
1975	116	−1.61%
1982	109	−0.89%
1990	119	+1.10%
1999	95	−2.47%
2007	85	−1.38%
2012	88	+0.70%
2017	84	−0.93%
2023	67	−3.70%
Source: INSEE

== See also ==
- Communes of the Pas-de-Calais department
