= Vitz-sur-Authie =

- Commune
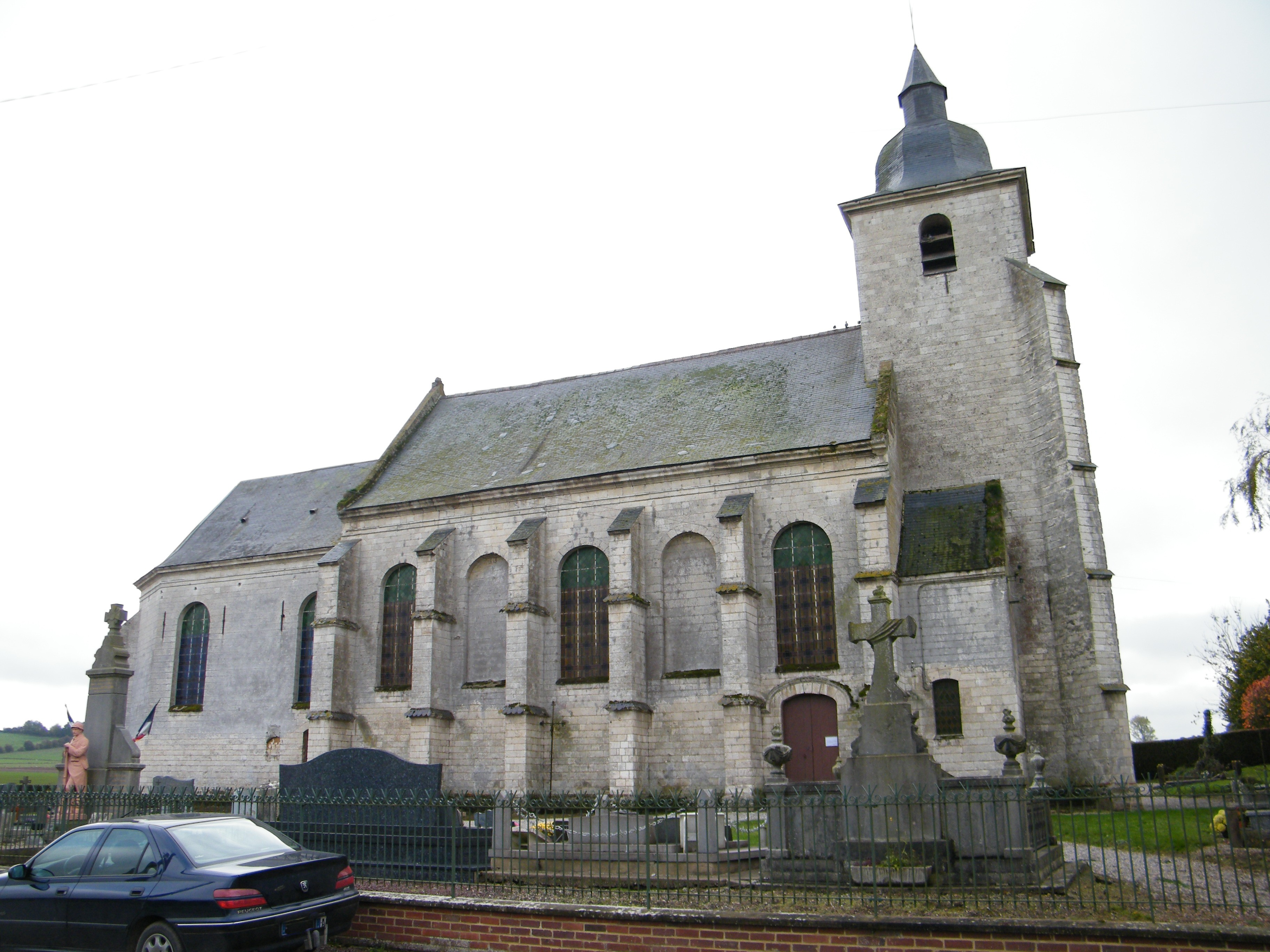
- The church in Vitz-sur-Authie
- Location of Vitz-sur-Authie
- Location within France Location within Hauts-de-France
- Coordinates: 50°15′13″N 2°03′59″E
- Country: France
- Region: Hauts-de-France
- Department: Somme
- Arrondissement: Abbeville
- Canton: Rue
- Intercommunality: Ternois

Government
  - Mayor (2020–2026): Michel Van Elslander
- Area^{1}: 4.66 km^{2} (1.80 sq mi)
- Elevation: 28 m (92 ft)
- Highest elevation: 94 m (308 ft)
- Lowest elevation: 22 m (72 ft)
- Population (2023): 136
  - Density: 29.2/km^{2} (75.6/sq mi)
- Time zone: UTC+01:00 (CET)
  - Summer (DST): UTC+02:00 (CEST)
- INSEE/Postal code: 80810 /80150
- ^{1} French Land Register data, which excludes lakes, ponds, glaciers > 1 km^{2} (0.386 sq mi or 247 acres) and river estuaries.

Vitz-sur-Authie is a commune in the Somme department in Hauts-de-France in northern France.

== Geography ==
The commune is situated 16 miles (26 km) northeast of Abbeville, on the D121 road and on the border with the Pas-de-Calais department.

== History ==
Also known as Vitz-lès-Willancourt, the commune was once the seigneurie of the d'Abbeville family.

== Population ==
Historical population
Year	Pop.	±% p.a.
1968	175	—
1975	158	−1.45%
1982	137	−2.02%
1990	122	−1.44%
1999	127	+0.45%
2007	111	−1.67%
2012	117	+1.06%
2017	127	+1.65%
2023	136	+1.15%
Source: INSEE

== See also ==
- Communes of the Somme department
