= Bouret-sur-Canche =

- Commune
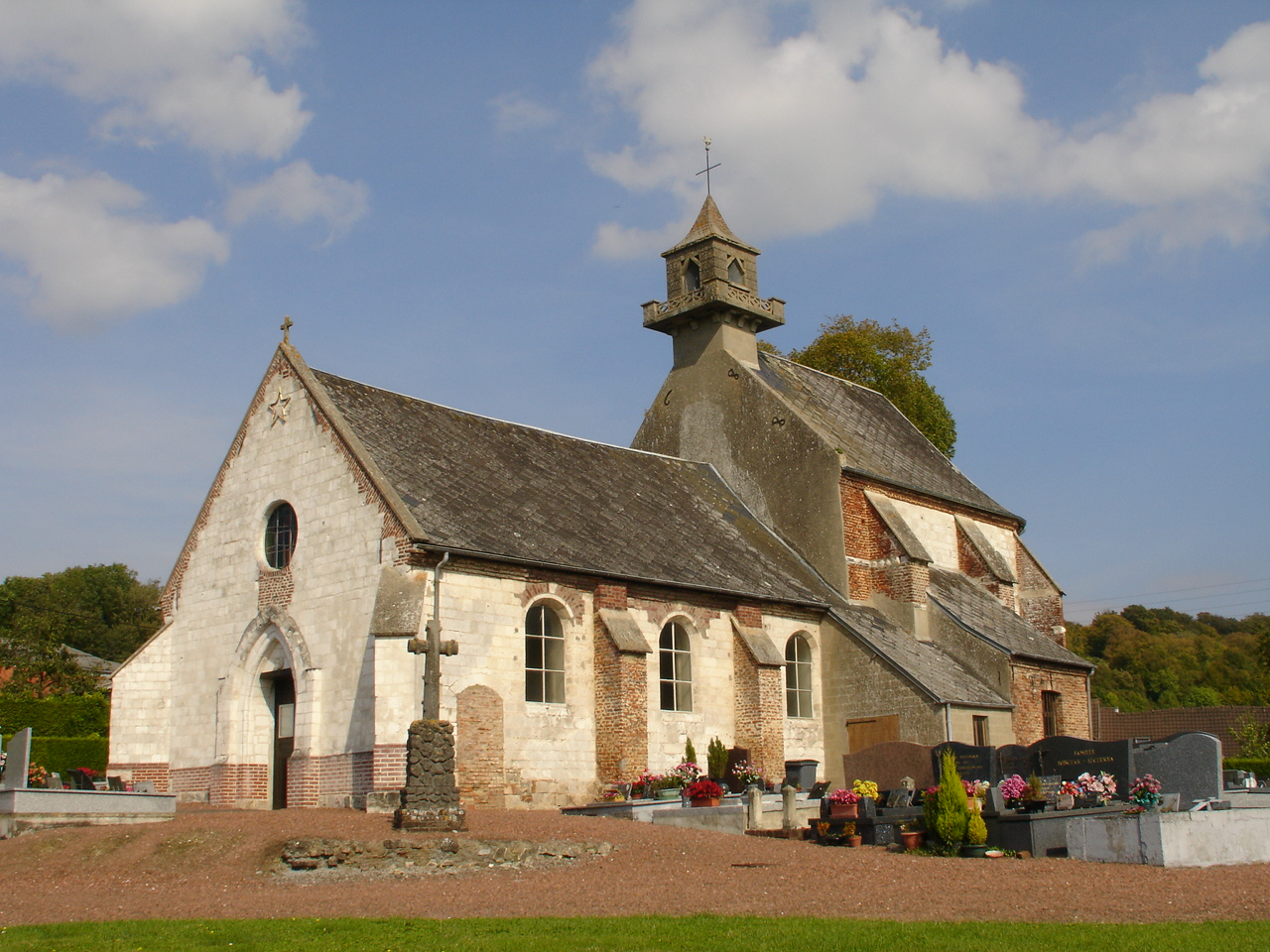
- The church of Bouret-sur-Canche

- Coat of arms
- Location of Bouret-sur-Canche
- Location within France Location within Hauts-de-France
- Coordinates: 50°16′11″N 2°19′30″E
- Country: France
- Region: Hauts-de-France
- Department: Pas-de-Calais
- Arrondissement: Arras
- Canton: Saint-Pol-sur-Ternoise
- Intercommunality: CC Ternois

Government
  - Mayor (2020–2026): Jean-Marie Delattre
- Area^{1}: 4.87 km^{2} (1.88 sq mi)
- Elevation: 76 m (249 ft)
- Highest elevation: 147 m (482 ft)
- Lowest elevation: 68 m (223 ft)
- Population (2023): 239
  - Density: 49.1/km^{2} (127/sq mi)
- Time zone: UTC+01:00 (CET)
  - Summer (DST): UTC+02:00 (CEST)
- INSEE/Postal code: 62163 /62270
- ^{1} French Land Register data, which excludes lakes, ponds, glaciers > 1 km^{2} (0.386 sq mi or 247 acres) and river estuaries.

Bouret-sur-Canche (French pronunciation: [buʁɛ syʁ kɑ̃ʃ], literally Bouret on Canche; Picard: Bouret-su-Canche) is a commune in the Pas-de-Calais department in the Hauts-de-France region in northern France.

== Geography ==
A farming village located 20 miles (32 km) west of Arras on the D329 road, by the banks of the river Canche.

== Population ==
Historical population
Year	Pop.	±% p.a.
1968	181	—
1975	186	+0.39%
1982	198	+0.90%
1990	194	−0.25%
1999	207	+0.72%
2007	247	+2.23%
2012	244	−0.24%
2017	256	+0.96%
2023	239	−1.14%
Source: INSEE

== Sights ==
- The church of St. Vaast, dating from the eighteenth century.
- An eighteenth-century chapel.

== See also ==
- Communes of the Pas-de-Calais department
