= Communauté de communes du Ternois =

Federation of municipalities in France

Ternois
- Communauté de communes
- Interactive map of Ternois
- Coordinates: 50°23′N 2°20′E
- Country: France
- Region: Hauts-de-France
- Department: Pas-de-Calais, Somme
- No. of communes: {{{nbcomm}}}
- Established: 2017
- Area: 633.6 km^{2} (244.6 sq mi)
- Population (2018): 38,158
  - Density: 60.22/km^{2} (156.0/sq mi)

The Communauté de communes du Ternois is a communauté de communes, an intercommunal structure, in the Pas-de-Calais and Somme departments, in the Hauts-de-France region of northern France. It was created in January 2017 by the merger of the former communautés de communes L'Auxillois, Région de Frévent, Le Pernois and Vertes Collines du Saint-Polois. Its area is 633.6 km^{2}, and its population was 38,158 in 2018. Its seat is in Saint-Pol-sur-Ternoise.

== Composition ==
The communauté de communes consists of the following 103 communes (of which one, Vitz-sur-Authie, in the Somme department):

1. Anvin
2. Aubrometz
3. Aumerval
4. Auxi-le-Château
5. Averdoingt
6. Bailleul-lès-Pernes
7. Beauvoir-Wavans
8. Beauvois
9. Bergueneuse
10. Bermicourt
11. Blangerval-Blangermont
12. Boffles
13. Bonnières
14. Boubers-sur-Canche
15. Bouret-sur-Canche
16. Bours
17. Boyaval
18. Brias
19. Buire-au-Bois
20. Buneville
21. Conchy-sur-Canche
22. Conteville-en-Ternois
23. Croisette
24. Croix-en-Ternois
25. Écoivres
26. Eps
27. Équirre
28. Érin
29. Fiefs
30. Flers
31. Fleury
32. Floringhem
33. Fontaine-lès-Boulans
34. Fontaine-lès-Hermans
35. Fontaine-l'Étalon
36. Fortel-en-Artois
37. Foufflin-Ricametz
38. Framecourt
39. Frévent
40. Gauchin-Verloingt
41. Gennes-Ivergny
42. Gouy-en-Ternois
43. Guinecourt
44. Haravesnes
45. Hautecloque
46. Héricourt
47. Herlincourt
48. Herlin-le-Sec
49. Hernicourt
50. Hestrus
51. Heuchin
52. Huclier
53. Humerœuille
54. Humières
55. Ligny-Saint-Flochel
56. Ligny-sur-Canche
57. Linzeux
58. Lisbourg
59. Maisnil
60. Marest
61. Marquay
62. Moncheaux-lès-Frévent
63. Monchel-sur-Canche
64. Monchy-Breton
65. Monchy-Cayeux
66. Monts-en-Ternois
67. Nédon
68. Nédonchel
69. Neuville-au-Cornet
70. Nœux-lès-Auxi
71. Nuncq-Hautecôte
72. Œuf-en-Ternois
73. Ostreville
74. Pernes
75. Pierremont
76. Le Ponchel
77. Prédefin
78. Pressy
79. Quœux-Haut-Maînil
80. Ramecourt
81. Roëllecourt
82. Rougefay
83. Sachin
84. Sains-lès-Pernes
85. Saint-Michel-sur-Ternoise
86. Saint-Pol-sur-Ternoise
87. Séricourt
88. Sibiville
89. Siracourt
90. Tangry
91. Teneur
92. Ternas
93. La Thieuloye
94. Tilly-Capelle
95. Tollent
96. Troisvaux
97. Vacquerie-le-Boucq
98. Valhuon
99. Vaulx
100. Villers-l'Hôpital
101. Vitz-sur-Authie
102. Wavrans-sur-Ternoise
103. Willencourt
