= Sibiville =

- Commune
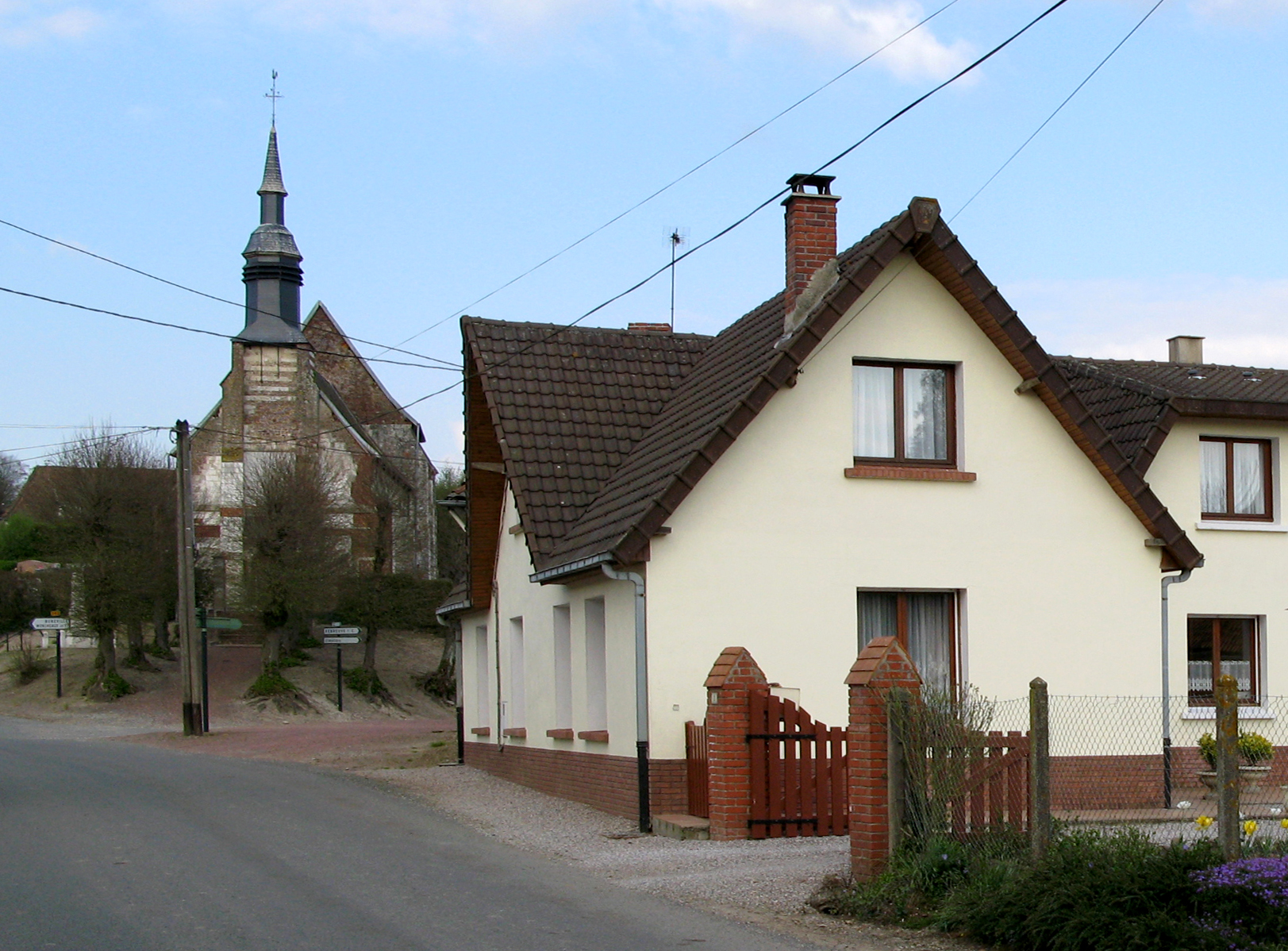
- A view within Sibiville

- Coat of arms
- Location of Sibiville
- Location within France Location within Hauts-de-France
- Coordinates: 50°17′57″N 2°19′29″E
- Country: France
- Region: Hauts-de-France
- Department: Pas-de-Calais
- Arrondissement: Arras
- Canton: Saint-Pol-sur-Ternoise
- Intercommunality: CC Ternois

Government
  - Mayor (2020–2026): Raymond Quentin
- Area^{1}: 7.35 km^{2} (2.84 sq mi)
- Elevation: 117 m (384 ft)
- Highest elevation: 151 m (495 ft)
- Lowest elevation: 89 m (292 ft)
- Population (2023): 118
  - Density: 16.1/km^{2} (41.6/sq mi)
- Time zone: UTC+01:00 (CET)
  - Summer (DST): UTC+02:00 (CEST)
- INSEE/Postal code: 62795 /62270
- ^{1} French Land Register data, which excludes lakes, ponds, glaciers > 1 km^{2} (0.386 sq mi or 247 acres) and river estuaries.

Sibiville (French pronunciation: [sibivil]) is a commune in the Pas-de-Calais department in the Hauts-de-France region of France 20 miles (32 km) west of Arras and 5 miles (8.0 km) south of Saint-Pol-sur-Ternoise.

== Population ==
Historical population
Year	Pop.	±% p.a.
1968	155	—
1975	135	−1.95%
1982	115	−2.26%
1990	106	−1.01%
1999	109	+0.31%
2007	92	−2.10%
2012	107	+3.07%
2017	111	+0.74%
2023	118	+1.02%
Source: INSEE

== See also ==
- Communes of the Pas-de-Calais department
