= Flers, Pas-de-Calais =

Flers
- Commune
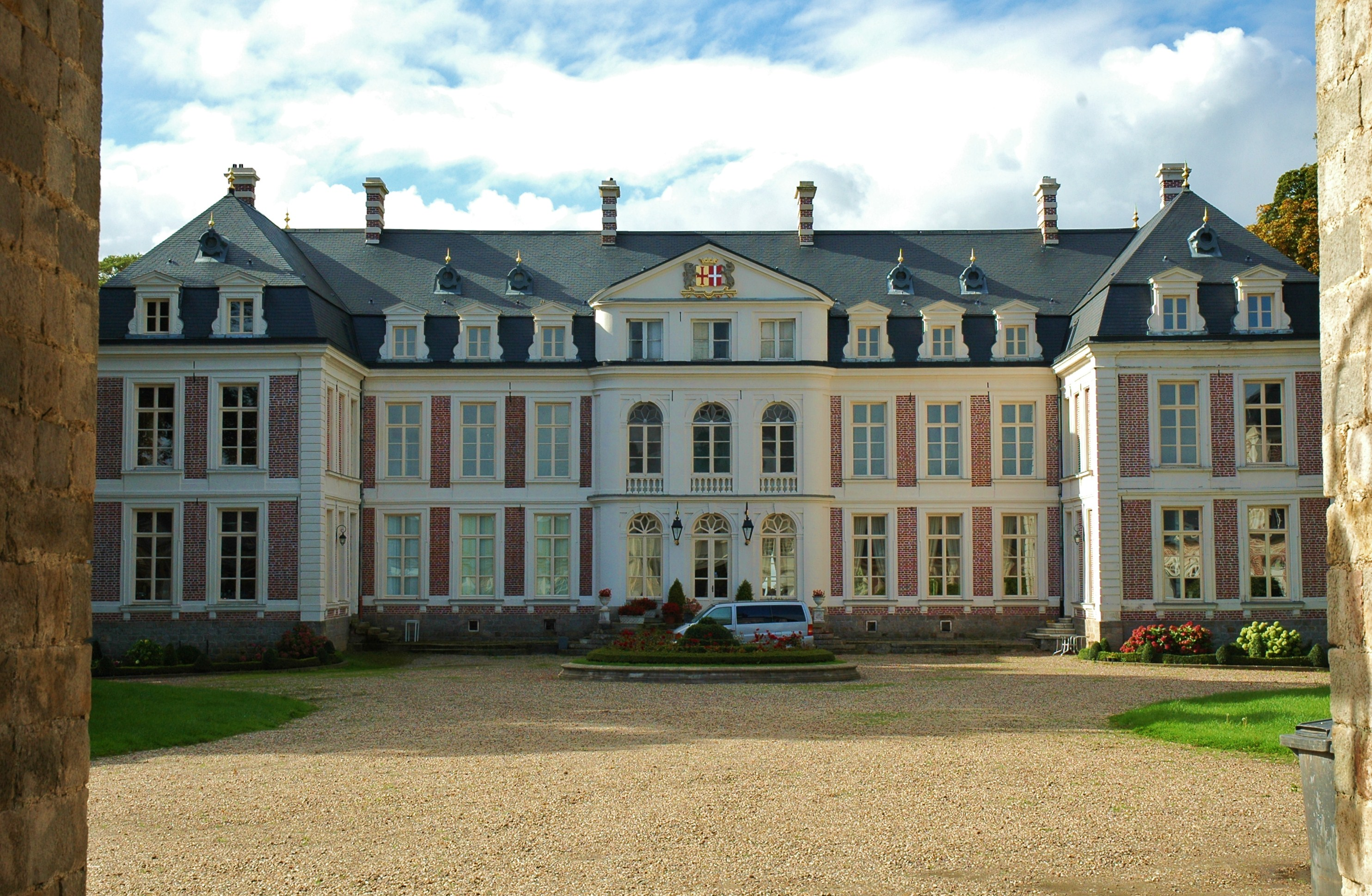
- The chateau of Flers

- Coat of arms
- Location of Flers
- Location within France Location within Hauts-de-France
- Coordinates: 50°19′17″N 2°15′15″E
- Country: France
- Region: Hauts-de-France
- Department: Pas-de-Calais
- Arrondissement: Arras
- Canton: Saint-Pol-sur-Ternoise
- Intercommunality: CC Ternois

Government
  - Mayor (2020–2026): Ingrid Gaillard
- Area^{1}: 5.5 km^{2} (2.1 sq mi)
- Elevation: 128 m (420 ft)
- Highest elevation: 143 m (469 ft)
- Lowest elevation: 78 m (256 ft)
- Population (2023): 227
  - Density: 41/km^{2} (110/sq mi)
- Time zone: UTC+01:00 (CET)
  - Summer (DST): UTC+02:00 (CEST)
- INSEE/Postal code: 62337 /62270
- ^{1} French Land Register data, which excludes lakes, ponds, glaciers > 1 km^{2} (0.386 sq mi or 247 acres) and river estuaries.

Flers (French pronunciation: [flɛʁ]) is a commune in the Pas-de-Calais department in the Hauts-de-France region of France 25 miles (40 km) west of Arras.

== Population ==
Historical population
Year	Pop.	±% p.a.
1968	250	—
1975	228	−1.31%
1982	227	−0.06%
1990	221	−0.33%
1999	200	−1.10%
2007	179	−1.38%
2012	207	+2.95%
2017	225	+1.68%
2023	227	+0.15%
Source: INSEE

== See also ==
- Communes of the Pas-de-Calais department
