= Troisvaux =

- Commune
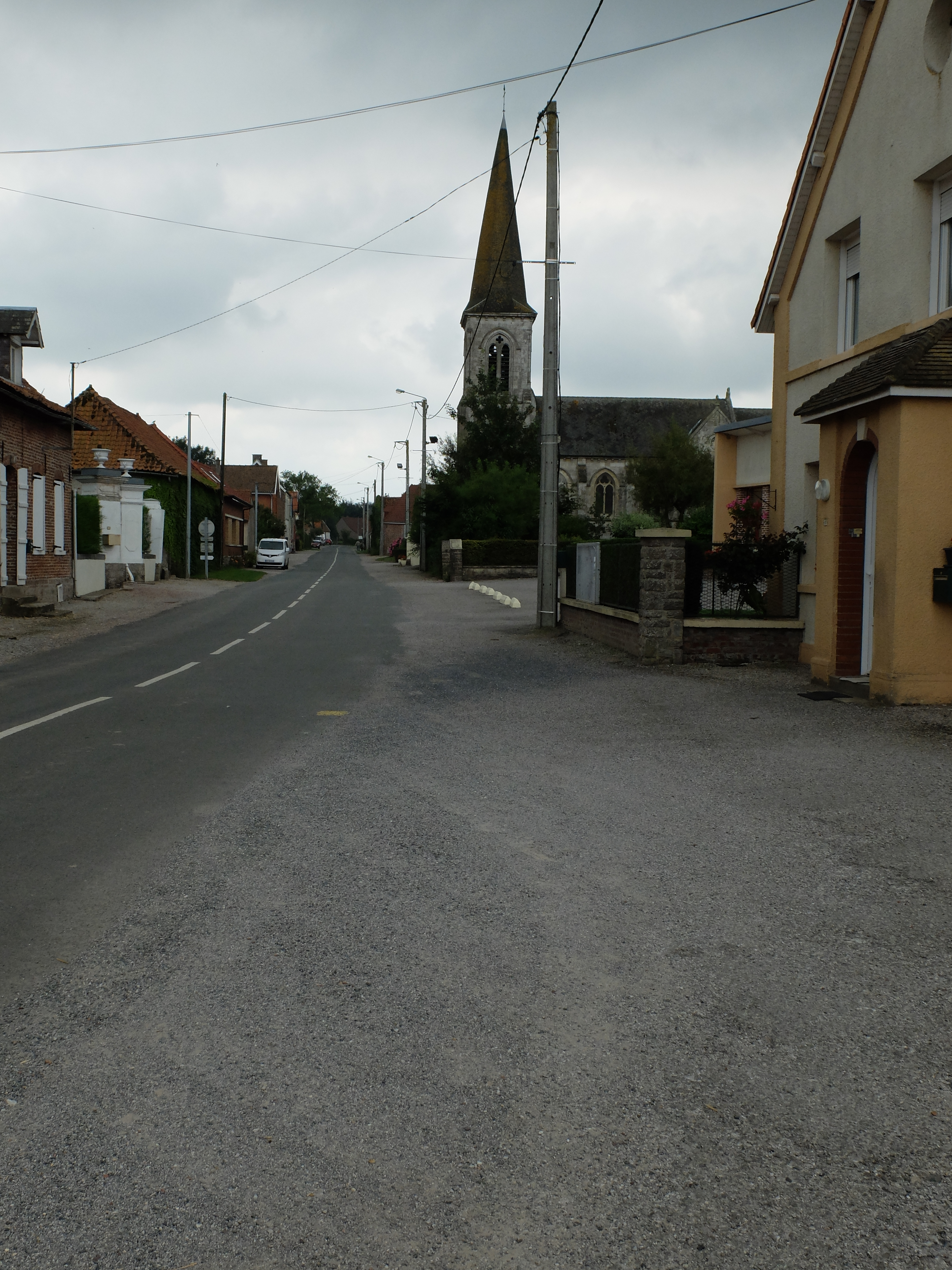
- The main road of Troisvaux

- Coat of arms
- Location of Troisvaux
- Location within France Location within Hauts-de-France
- Coordinates: 50°24′09″N 2°20′37″E
- Country: France
- Region: Hauts-de-France
- Department: Pas-de-Calais
- Arrondissement: Arras
- Canton: Saint-Pol-sur-Ternoise
- Intercommunality: CC Ternois

Government
  - Mayor (2020–2026): Charles Torchy
- Area^{1}: 6.18 km^{2} (2.39 sq mi)
- Elevation: 144 m (472 ft)
- Highest elevation: 157 m (515 ft)
- Lowest elevation: 85 m (279 ft)
- Population (2023): 293
  - Density: 47.4/km^{2} (123/sq mi)
- Time zone: UTC+01:00 (CET)
  - Summer (DST): UTC+02:00 (CEST)
- INSEE/Postal code: 62831 /62130
- ^{1} French Land Register data, which excludes lakes, ponds, glaciers > 1 km^{2} (0.386 sq mi or 247 acres) and river estuaries.

Troisvaux (French pronunciation: [tʁwavo]) is a commune in the Pas-de-Calais department in the Hauts-de-France region of France north of St. Pol, 21 miles (34 km) west of Arras.

== Population ==
Historical population
Year	Pop.	±% p.a.
1968	257	—
1975	265	+0.44%
1982	265	+0.00%
1990	294	+1.31%
1999	296	+0.08%
2007	290	−0.26%
2012	296	+0.41%
2017	279	−1.18%
2023	293	+0.82%
Source: INSEE

== See also ==
- Communes of the Pas-de-Calais department
