= Séricourt =

- Commune
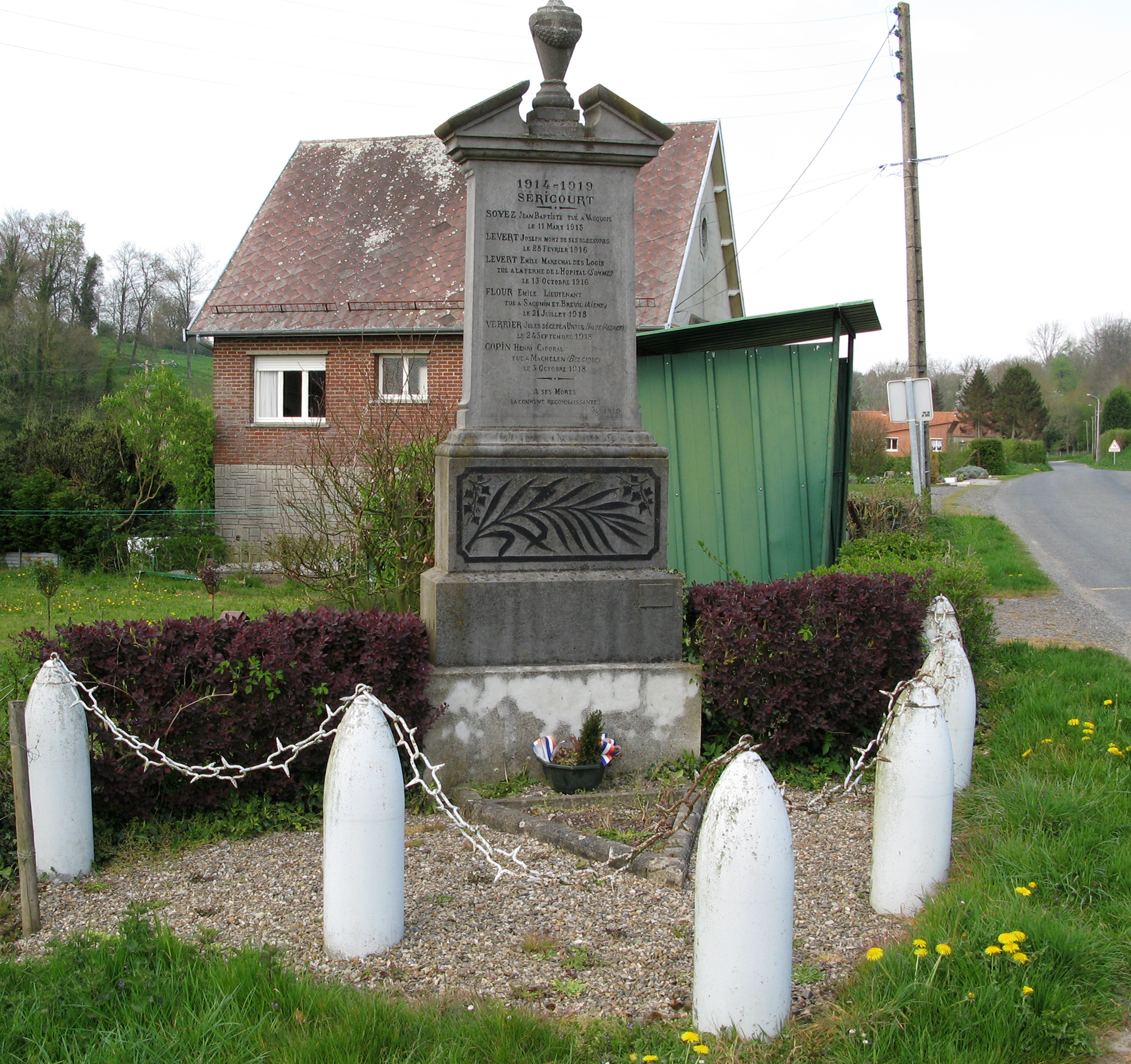
- The monument to the dead of Séricourt
- Location of Séricourt
- Location within France Location within Hauts-de-France
- Coordinates: 50°17′45″N 2°18′56″E
- Country: France
- Region: Hauts-de-France
- Department: Pas-de-Calais
- Arrondissement: Arras
- Canton: Saint-Pol-sur-Ternoise
- Intercommunality: CC Ternois

Government
  - Mayor (2020–2026): Sylvain Ducroquet
- Area^{1}: 2.45 km^{2} (0.95 sq mi)
- Elevation: 83 m (272 ft)
- Highest elevation: 145 m (476 ft)
- Lowest elevation: 79 m (259 ft)
- Population (2023): 49
  - Density: 20/km^{2} (52/sq mi)
- Time zone: UTC+01:00 (CET)
  - Summer (DST): UTC+02:00 (CEST)
- INSEE/Postal code: 62791 /62270
- ^{1} French Land Register data, which excludes lakes, ponds, glaciers > 1 km^{2} (0.386 sq mi or 247 acres) and river estuaries.

Séricourt (French pronunciation: [seʁikuʁ]) is a commune in the Pas-de-Calais department in the Hauts-de-France region of France 25 miles (40 km) west of Arras.

== Population ==
Historical population
Year	Pop.	±% p.a.
1968	39	—
1975	48	+3.01%
1982	47	−0.30%
1990	53	+1.51%
1999	60	+1.39%
2007	52	−1.77%
2012	53	+0.38%
2017	54	+0.37%
2023	49	−1.61%
Source: INSEE

== See also ==
- Communes of the Pas-de-Calais department
