= Conteville-en-Ternois =

- Commune
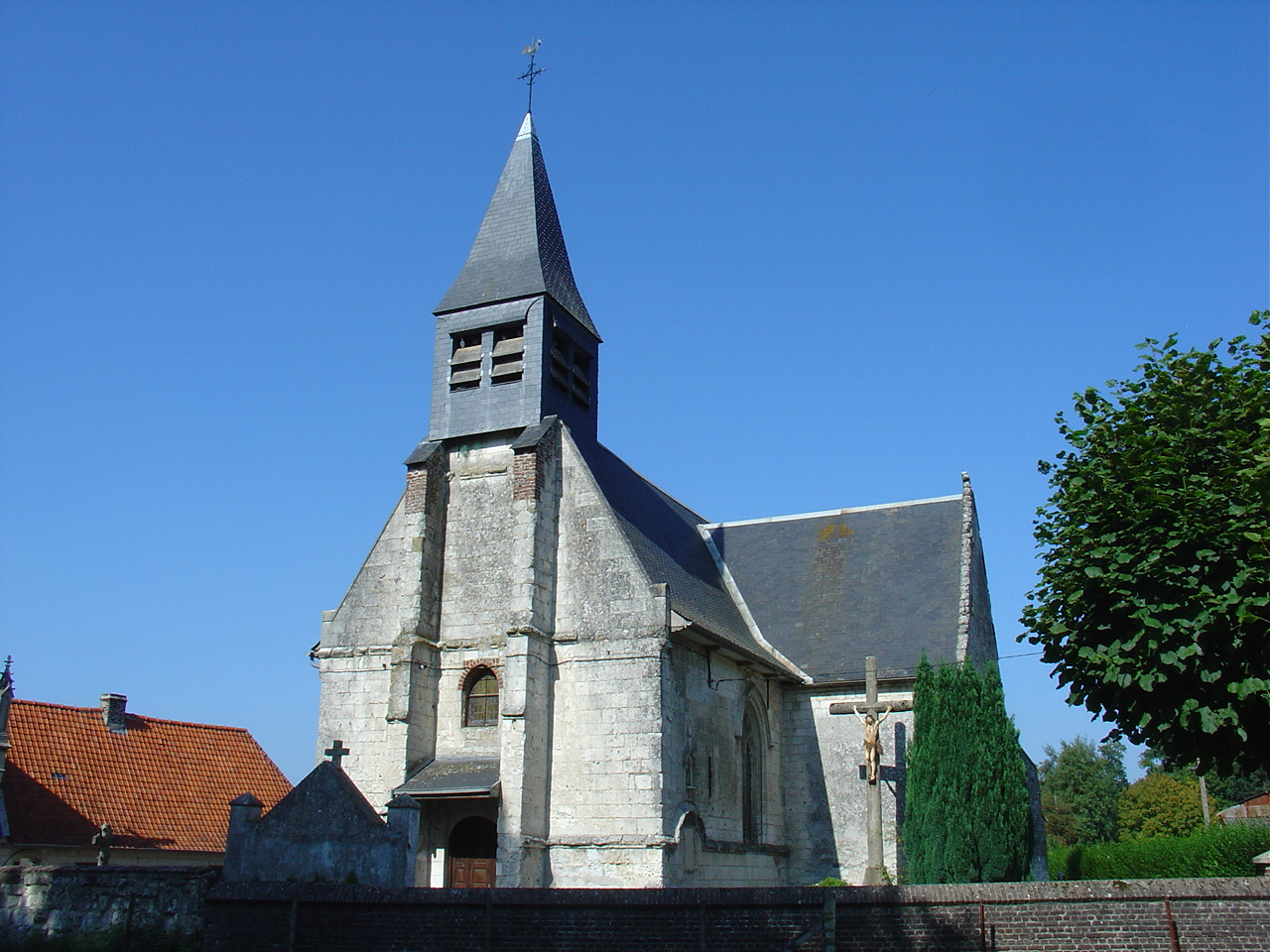
- The church of Conteville-en-Ternois

- Coat of arms
- Location of Conteville-en-Ternois
- Location within France Location within Hauts-de-France
- Coordinates: 50°25′58″N 2°19′30″E
- Country: France
- Region: Hauts-de-France
- Department: Pas-de-Calais
- Arrondissement: Arras
- Canton: Saint-Pol-sur-Ternoise
- Intercommunality: CC Ternois

Government
  - Mayor (2020–2026): Jean-Claude Habert
- Area^{1}: 2.29 km^{2} (0.88 sq mi)
- Elevation: 147 m (482 ft)
- Highest elevation: 156 m (512 ft)
- Lowest elevation: 85 m (279 ft)
- Population (2023): 83
  - Density: 36/km^{2} (94/sq mi)
- Time zone: UTC+01:00 (CET)
  - Summer (DST): UTC+02:00 (CEST)
- INSEE/Postal code: 62238 /62130
- ^{1} French Land Register data, which excludes lakes, ponds, glaciers > 1 km^{2} (0.386 sq mi or 247 acres) and river estuaries.

Conteville-en-Ternois (before 1987: Conteville) is a commune in the Pas-de-Calais department in the Hauts-de-France region of France 21 miles (34 km) northwest of Arras.

== Population ==
Historical population
| Year | Pop. | ±% p.a. |
|---|---|---|
| 1968 | 118 | — |
| 1975 | 84 | −4.74% |
| 1982 | 74 | −1.79% |
| 1990 | 73 | −0.17% |
| 1999 | 69 | −0.62% |
| 2007 | 79 | +1.71% |
| 2012 | 88 | +2.18% |
| 2017 | 91 | +0.67% |
| 2023 | 83 | −1.52% |
Source: INSEE

== See also ==
- Communes of the Pas-de-Calais department
