= Bergueneuse =

- Commune
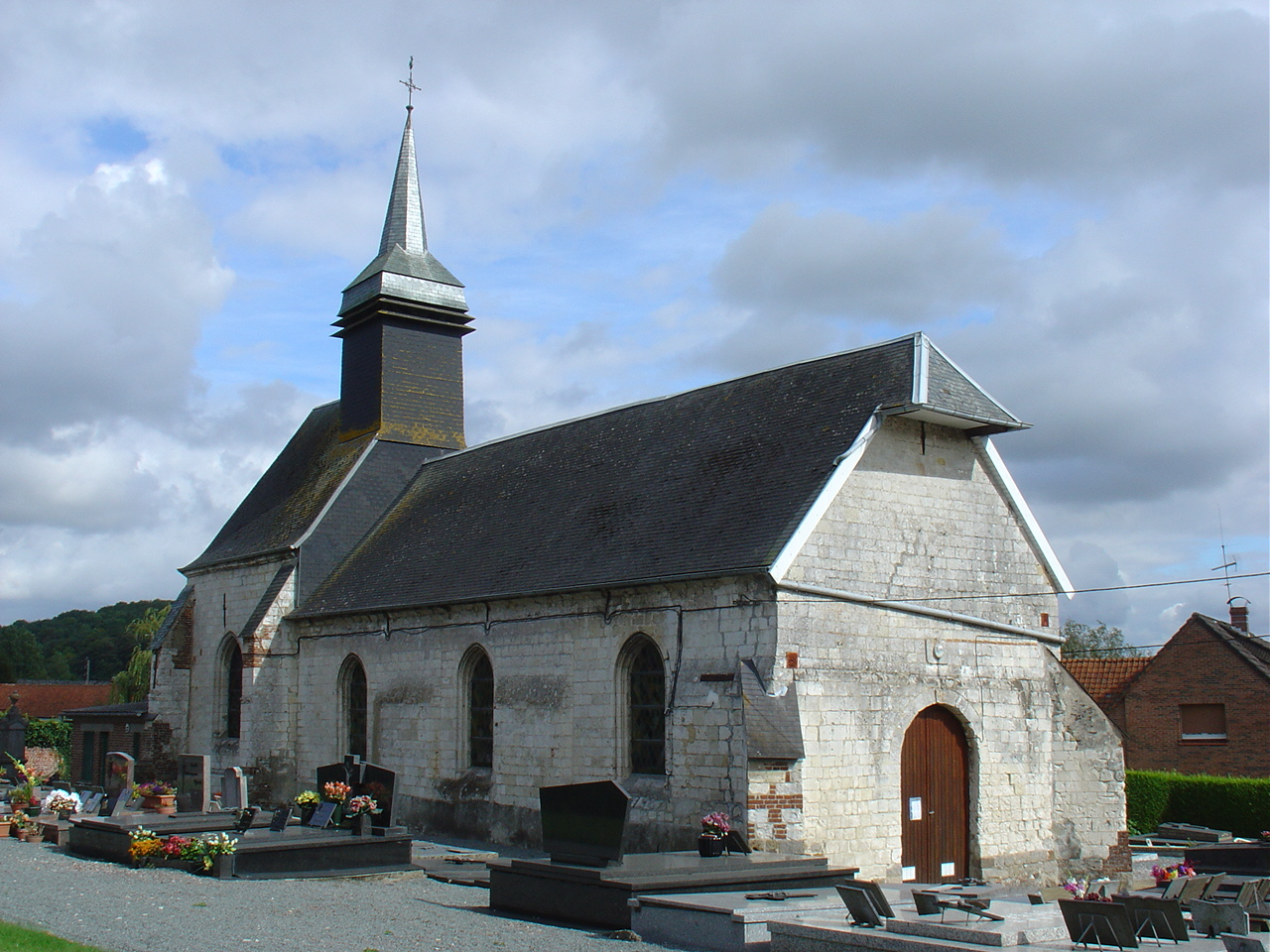
- The church of Bergueneuse

- Coat of arms
- Location of Bergueneuse
- Location within France Location within Hauts-de-France
- Coordinates: 50°28′09″N 2°15′15″E
- Country: France
- Region: Hauts-de-France
- Department: Pas-de-Calais
- Arrondissement: Arras
- Canton: Saint-Pol-sur-Ternoise
- Intercommunality: CC du Ternois

Government
  - Mayor (2020–2026): Christopher Beharelle
- Area^{1}: 2.78 km^{2} (1.07 sq mi)
- Elevation: 130 m (430 ft)
- Highest elevation: 132 m (433 ft)
- Lowest elevation: 64 m (210 ft)
- Population (2023): 213
  - Density: 76.6/km^{2} (198/sq mi)
- Time zone: UTC+01:00 (CET)
  - Summer (DST): UTC+02:00 (CEST)
- INSEE/Postal code: 62109 /62134
- ^{1} French Land Register data, which excludes lakes, ponds, glaciers > 1 km^{2} (0.386 sq mi or 247 acres) and river estuaries.

Bergueneuse (French pronunciation: [bɛʁɡənøz]; Picard: Berguigneu) is a commune in the Pas-de-Calais department in the Hauts-de-France region in northern France.

== Geography ==
Bergueneuse consists of a village located 28 miles (42 km) northwest of Arras at the D94 and D71 road junction.

== Population ==
Historical population
Year	Pop.	±% p.a.
1968	226	—
1975	252	+1.57%
1982	243	−0.52%
1990	239	−0.21%
1999	241	+0.09%
2007	219	−1.19%
2012	212	−0.65%
2017	218	+0.56%
2023	213	−0.39%
Source: INSEE

== Sights ==
- The seventeenth-century church.

== Transport ==
The Chemin de fer d'Anvin à Calais opened a railway station at Bergueneuse in 1881. The railway was closed in 1952.

== See also ==
- Communes of the Pas-de-Calais department
