= Hestrus =

- Commune
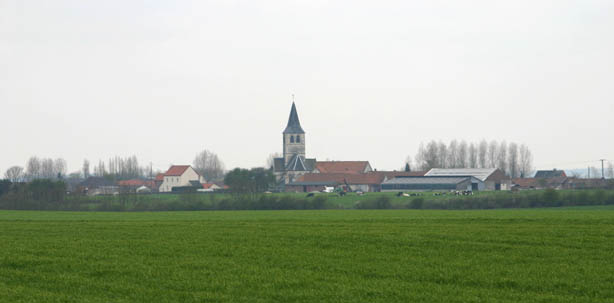
- A general view of Hestrus

- Coat of arms
- Location of Hestrus
- Location within France Location within Hauts-de-France
- Coordinates: 50°26′55″N 2°19′52″E
- Country: France
- Region: Hauts-de-France
- Department: Pas-de-Calais
- Arrondissement: Arras
- Canton: Saint-Pol-sur-Ternoise
- Intercommunality: CC Ternois

Government
  - Mayor (2020–2026): Philippe Ducatel
- Area^{1}: 7.8 km^{2} (3.0 sq mi)
- Elevation: 151 m (495 ft)
- Highest elevation: 167 m (548 ft)
- Lowest elevation: 85 m (279 ft)
- Population (2023): 215
  - Density: 28/km^{2} (71/sq mi)
- Time zone: UTC+01:00 (CET)
  - Summer (DST): UTC+02:00 (CEST)
- INSEE/Postal code: 62450 /62550
- ^{1} French Land Register data, which excludes lakes, ponds, glaciers > 1 km^{2} (0.386 sq mi or 247 acres) and river estuaries.

Hestrus is a commune in the Pas-de-Calais department in the Hauts-de-France region of France about 25 miles (40 km) northwest of Arras.

== Population ==
Historical population
Year	Pop.	±% p.a.
1968	323	—
1975	292	−1.43%
1982	276	−0.80%
1990	272	−0.18%
1999	239	−1.43%
2007	227	−0.64%
2012	251	+2.03%
2017	243	−0.65%
2023	215	−2.02%
Source: INSEE

== See also ==
- Communes of the Pas-de-Calais department
