= Bailleul-lès-Pernes =

- Commune
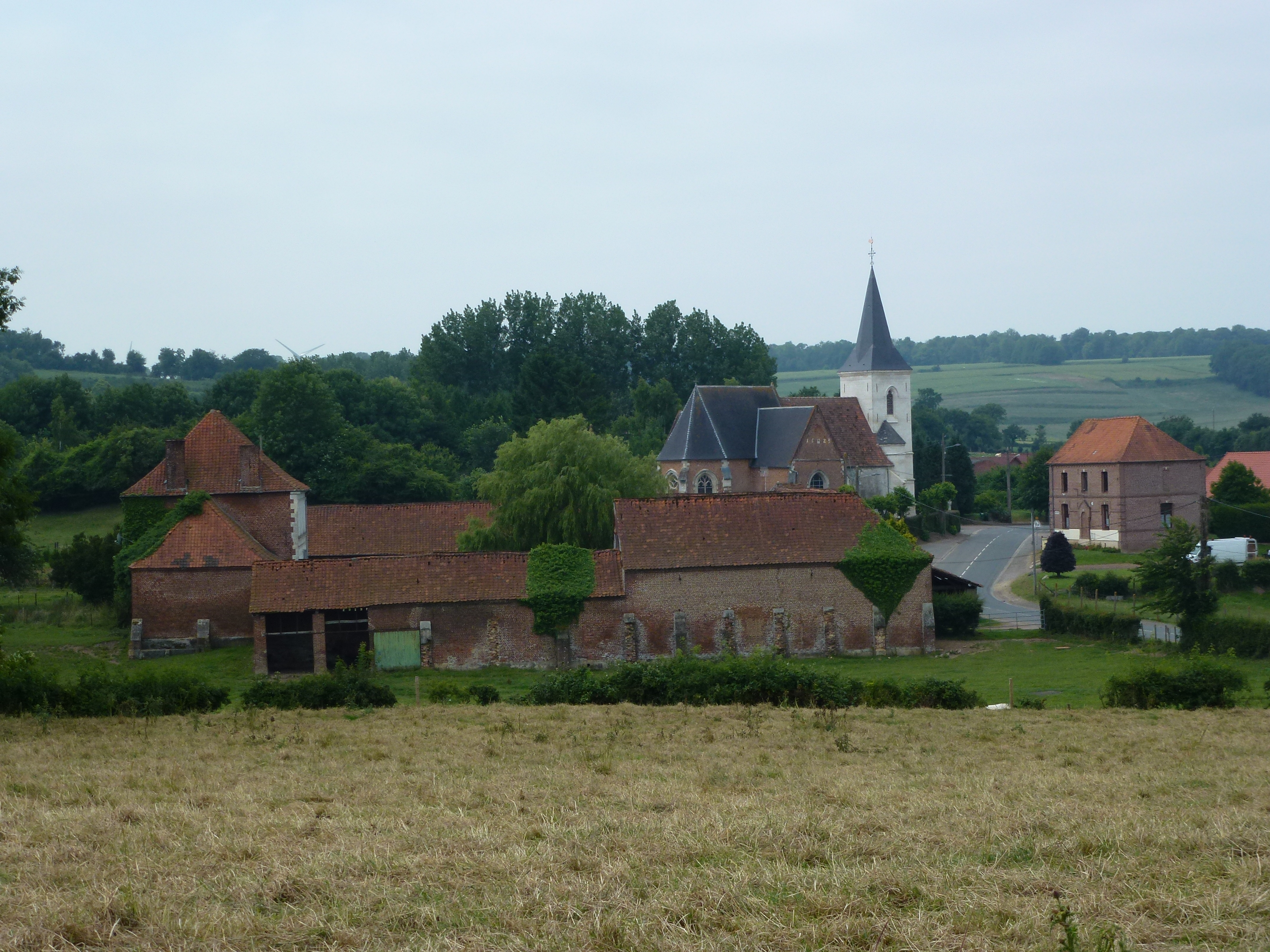
- A general view of Bailleul-lès-Pernes

- Coat of arms
- Location of Bailleul-lès-Pernes
- Location within France Location within Hauts-de-France
- Coordinates: 50°30′34″N 2°23′17″E
- Country: France
- Region: Hauts-de-France
- Department: Pas-de-Calais
- Arrondissement: Arras
- Canton: Saint-Pol-sur-Ternoise
- Intercommunality: CC du Ternois

Government
  - Mayor (2020–2026): Jean Bruyant
- Area^{1}: 3.49 km^{2} (1.35 sq mi)
- Elevation: 105 m (344 ft)
- Highest elevation: 188 m (617 ft)
- Lowest elevation: 103 m (338 ft)
- Population (2023): 408
  - Density: 117/km^{2} (303/sq mi)
- Time zone: UTC+01:00 (CET)
  - Summer (DST): UTC+02:00 (CEST)
- INSEE/Postal code: 62071 /62550
- ^{1} French Land Register data, which excludes lakes, ponds, glaciers > 1 km^{2} (0.386 sq mi or 247 acres) and river estuaries.

Bailleul-lès-Pernes (French pronunciation: [bajœl lɛ pɛʁn], literally Bailleul near Pernes) is a commune in the Pas-de-Calais department in the Hauts-de-France region of France.

== Geography ==
A farming village located 25 miles (40 km) northwest of Arras, on the D90 road.

== Population ==
Historical population
Year	Pop.	±% p.a.
1968	337	—
1975	311	−1.14%
1982	293	−0.85%
1990	299	+0.25%
1999	304	+0.18%
2007	349	+1.74%
2012	401	+2.82%
2017	422	+1.03%
2023	408	−0.56%
Source: INSEE

== Sights ==
- The church of St. Omer, dating from the eighteenth century.
- The vestiges of an ancient castle.

== See also ==
- Communes of the Pas-de-Calais department
