= Pierremont =

- Commune
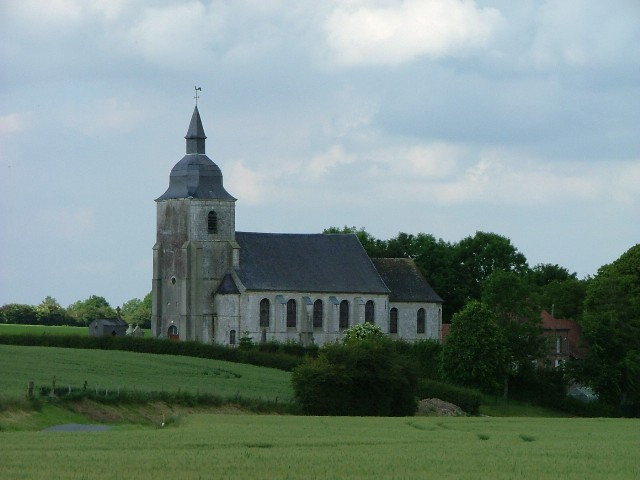
- The church of Pierremont

- Coat of arms
- Location of Pierremont
- Location within France Location within Hauts-de-France
- Coordinates: 50°24′06″N 2°15′42″E
- Country: France
- Region: Hauts-de-France
- Department: Pas-de-Calais
- Arrondissement: Arras
- Canton: Saint-Pol-sur-Ternoise
- Intercommunality: CC Ternois

Government
  - Mayor (2020–2026): Claudy Lhomme
- Area^{1}: 6.14 km^{2} (2.37 sq mi)
- Elevation: 114 m (374 ft)
- Highest elevation: 155 m (509 ft)
- Lowest elevation: 98 m (322 ft)
- Population (2023): 325
  - Density: 52.9/km^{2} (137/sq mi)
- Time zone: UTC+01:00 (CET)
  - Summer (DST): UTC+02:00 (CEST)
- INSEE/Postal code: 62655 /62130
- ^{1} French Land Register data, which excludes lakes, ponds, glaciers > 1 km^{2} (0.386 sq mi or 247 acres) and river estuaries.

Pierremont (French pronunciation: [pjɛʁmɔ̃]) is a commune in the Pas-de-Calais department in the Hauts-de-France region of France. 28 miles (45 km) west of Arras.

== Population ==
Historical population
Year	Pop.	±% p.a.
1968	254	—
1975	229	−1.47%
1982	218	−0.70%
1990	236	+1.00%
1999	252	+0.73%
2007	259	+0.34%
2012	279	+1.50%
2017	292	+0.92%
2023	325	+1.80%
Source: INSEE

== See also ==
- Communes of the Pas-de-Calais department
