= Écoivres =

- Commune
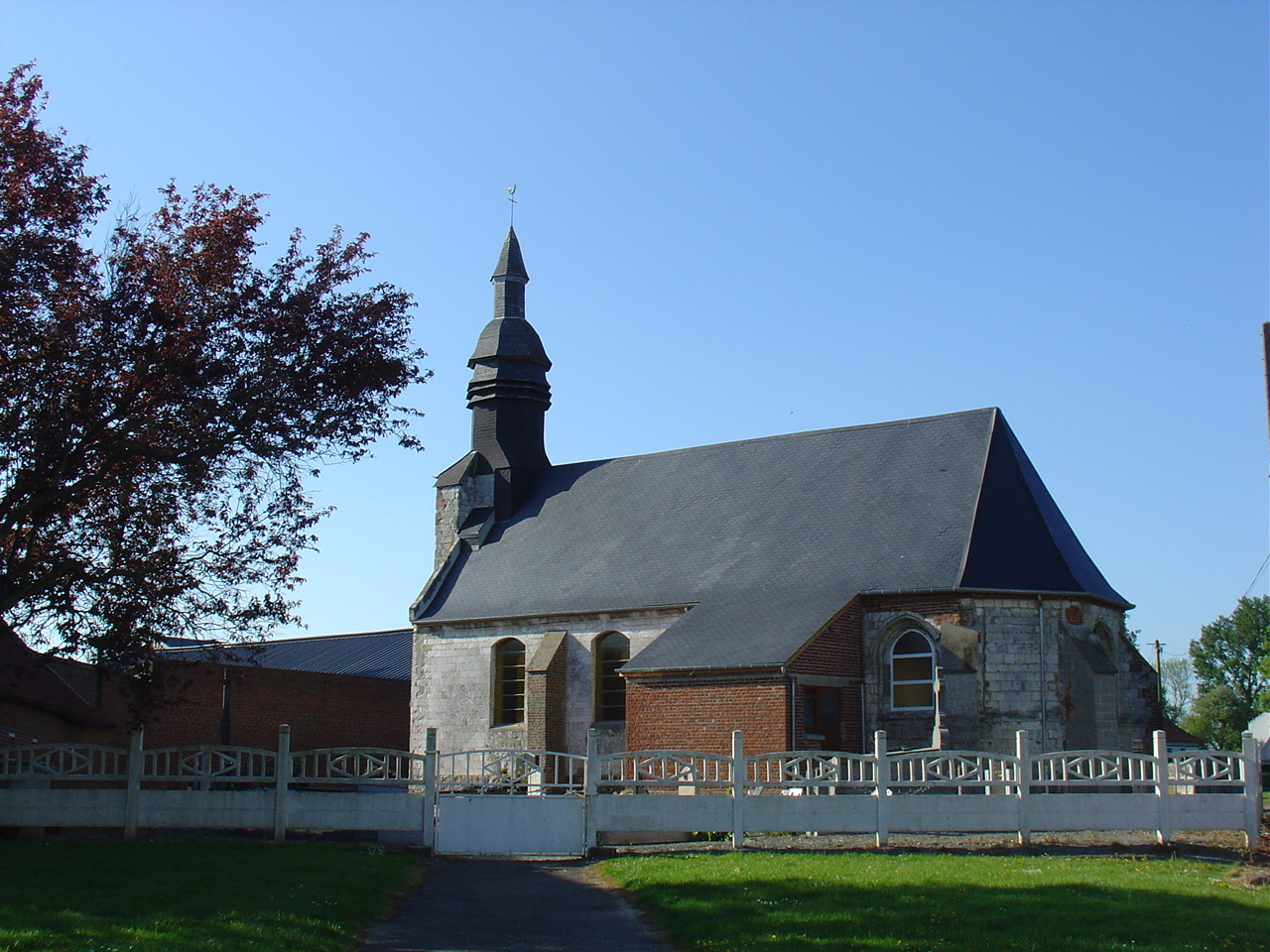
- The church of Ecoivres

- Coat of arms
- Location of Écoivres
- Location within France Location within Hauts-de-France
- Coordinates: 50°19′27″N 2°17′20″E
- Country: France
- Region: Hauts-de-France
- Department: Pas-de-Calais
- Arrondissement: Arras
- Canton: Saint-Pol-sur-Ternoise
- Intercommunality: CC Ternois

Government
  - Mayor (2020–2026): Hervé Bridoux
- Area^{1}: 2.22 km^{2} (0.86 sq mi)
- Elevation: 142 m (466 ft)
- Highest elevation: 148 m (486 ft)
- Lowest elevation: 122 m (400 ft)
- Population (2023): 124
  - Density: 55.9/km^{2} (145/sq mi)
- Time zone: UTC+01:00 (CET)
  - Summer (DST): UTC+02:00 (CEST)
- INSEE/Postal code: 62283 /62270
- ^{1} French Land Register data, which excludes lakes, ponds, glaciers > 1 km^{2} (0.386 sq mi or 247 acres) and river estuaries.

Écoivres (French pronunciation: [ekwavʁ]) is a commune in the Pas-de-Calais department in the Hauts-de-France region of France.

A hamlet with the same name is to be found in the commune of Mont-Saint-Eloi.

== Geography ==
A small farming village 20 miles (32 km) west of Arras at the junction of the D103 and D104 roads.

== Population ==
Historical population
Year	Pop.	±% p.a.
1968	106	—
1975	96	−1.41%
1982	89	−1.08%
1990	86	−0.43%
1999	94	+0.99%
2007	101	+0.90%
2012	122	+3.85%
2017	131	+1.43%
2023	124	−0.91%
Source: INSEE

== Places of interest ==
- The church of St.Martin, dating from the sixteenth century.
- Traces of an old castle.

== See also ==
- Communes of the Pas-de-Calais department
