= Humerœuille =

- Commune
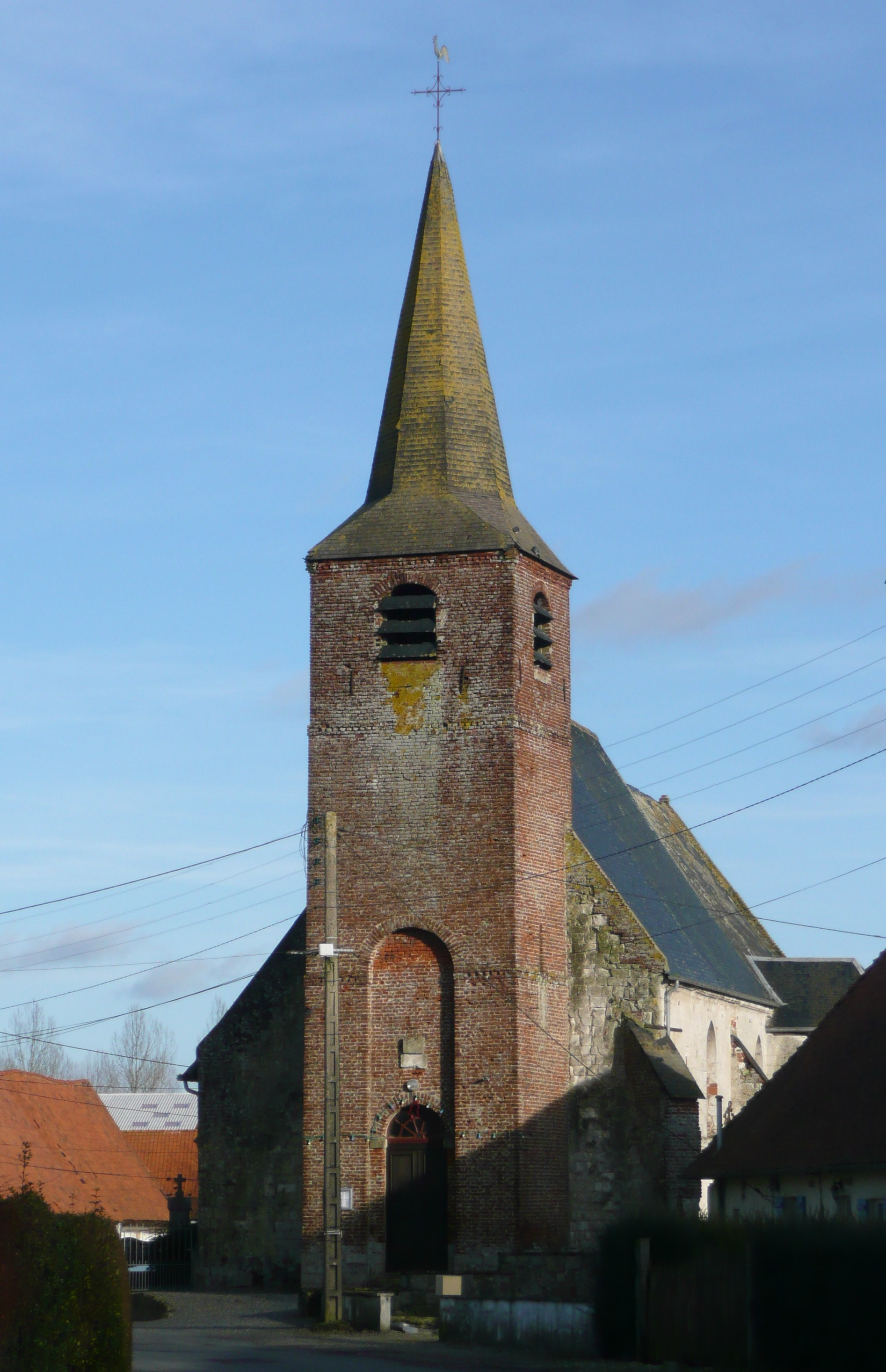
- The church of Humerœuille

- Coat of arms
- Location of Humerœuille
- Location within France Location within Hauts-de-France
- Coordinates: 50°24′19″N 2°12′51″E
- Country: France
- Region: Hauts-de-France
- Department: Pas-de-Calais
- Arrondissement: Arras
- Canton: Saint-Pol-sur-Ternoise
- Intercommunality: CC Ternois

Government
  - Mayor (2020–2026): Denis Gourdin
- Area^{1}: 3.23 km^{2} (1.25 sq mi)
- Elevation: 118 m (387 ft)
- Highest elevation: 131 m (430 ft)
- Lowest elevation: 84 m (276 ft)
- Population (2023): 182
  - Density: 56.3/km^{2} (146/sq mi)
- Time zone: UTC+01:00 (CET)
  - Summer (DST): UTC+02:00 (CEST)
- INSEE/Postal code: 62467 /62130
- ^{1} French Land Register data, which excludes lakes, ponds, glaciers > 1 km^{2} (0.386 sq mi or 247 acres) and river estuaries.

Humerœuille (French pronunciation: [ymʁœj]) is a commune in the Pas-de-Calais department in the Hauts-de-France region of France 28 miles (45 km) west of Arras.

== Population ==
The inhabitants are called Humerœuillois in French.

Historical population
Year	Pop.	±% p.a.
1968	175	—
1975	156	−1.63%
1982	170	+1.24%
1990	176	+0.43%
1999	143	−2.28%
2007	147	+0.35%
2012	148	+0.14%
2017	176	+3.53%
2023	182	+0.56%
Source: INSEE

== See also ==
- Communes of the Pas-de-Calais department
