= Herlin-le-Sec =

- Commune
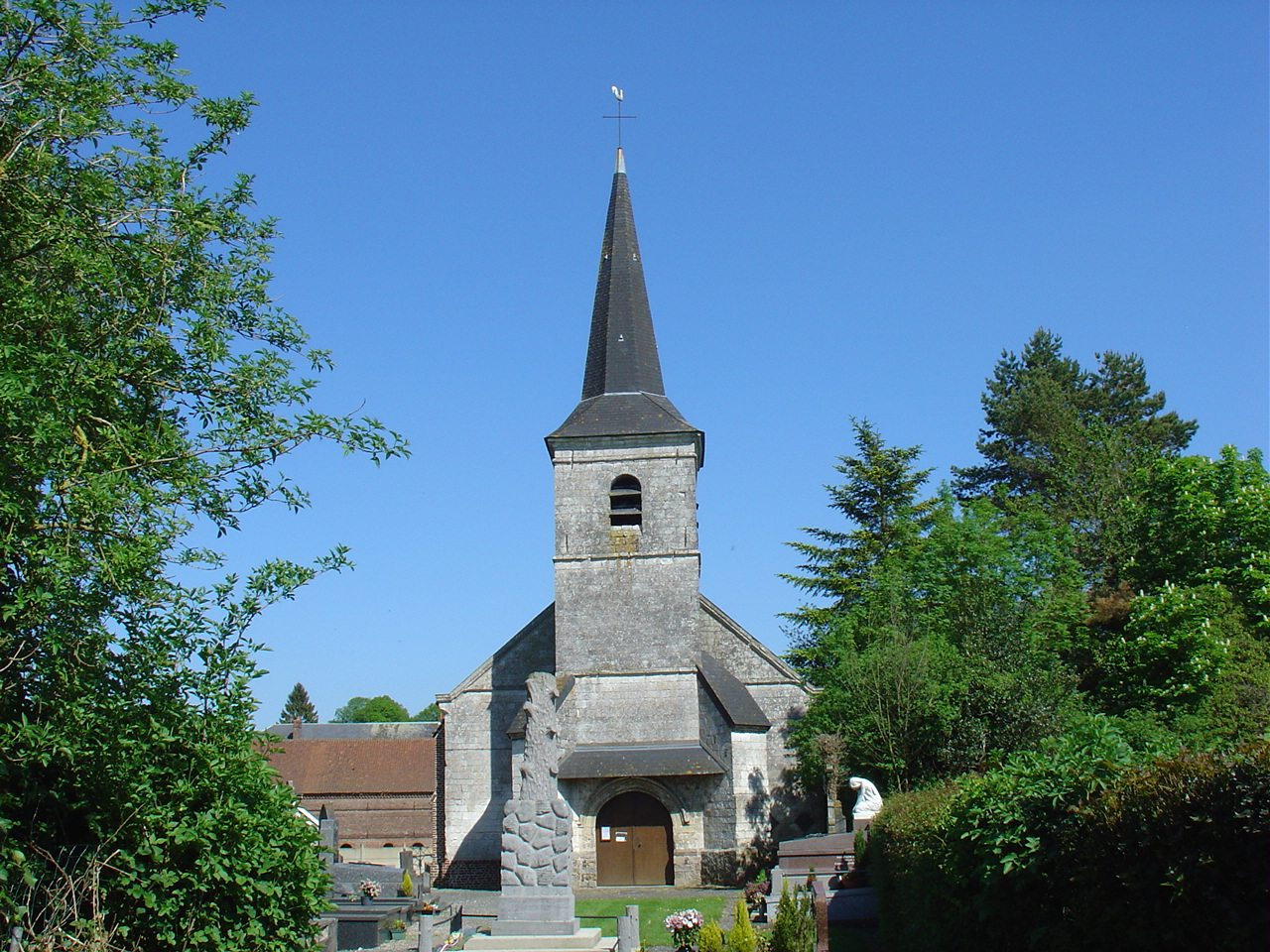
- The church of Herlin-le-Sec

- Coat of arms
- Location of Herlin-le-Sec
- Location within France Location within Hauts-de-France
- Coordinates: 50°21′20″N 2°19′49″E
- Country: France
- Region: Hauts-de-France
- Department: Pas-de-Calais
- Arrondissement: Arras
- Canton: Saint-Pol-sur-Ternoise
- Intercommunality: CC Ternois

Government
  - Mayor (2020–2026): Jean-Daniel Capon
- Area^{1}: 3.86 km^{2} (1.49 sq mi)
- Elevation: 140 m (460 ft)
- Highest elevation: 151 m (495 ft)
- Lowest elevation: 127 m (417 ft)
- Population (2023): 161
  - Density: 41.7/km^{2} (108/sq mi)
- Time zone: UTC+01:00 (CET)
  - Summer (DST): UTC+02:00 (CEST)
- INSEE/Postal code: 62436 /62130
- ^{1} French Land Register data, which excludes lakes, ponds, glaciers > 1 km^{2} (0.386 sq mi or 247 acres) and river estuaries.

Herlin-le-Sec (French pronunciation: [ɛʁlɛ̃ lə sɛk]) is a commune in the Pas-de-Calais department in the Hauts-de-France region of France 22 miles (35 km) west of Arras, 2 miles (3 km) south of Saint-Pol-sur-Ternoise.

== Population ==
Historical population
Year	Pop.	±% p.a.
1968	173	—
1975	158	−1.29%
1982	137	−2.02%
1990	147	+0.88%
1999	151	+0.30%
2007	157	+0.49%
2012	171	+1.72%
2017	171	+0.00%
2023	161	−1.00%
Source: INSEE

== See also ==
- Communes of the Pas-de-Calais department
