= Gouy-en-Ternois =

Gouy-en-Ternois Gouy-in-Térnoé (Picard)
- Commune
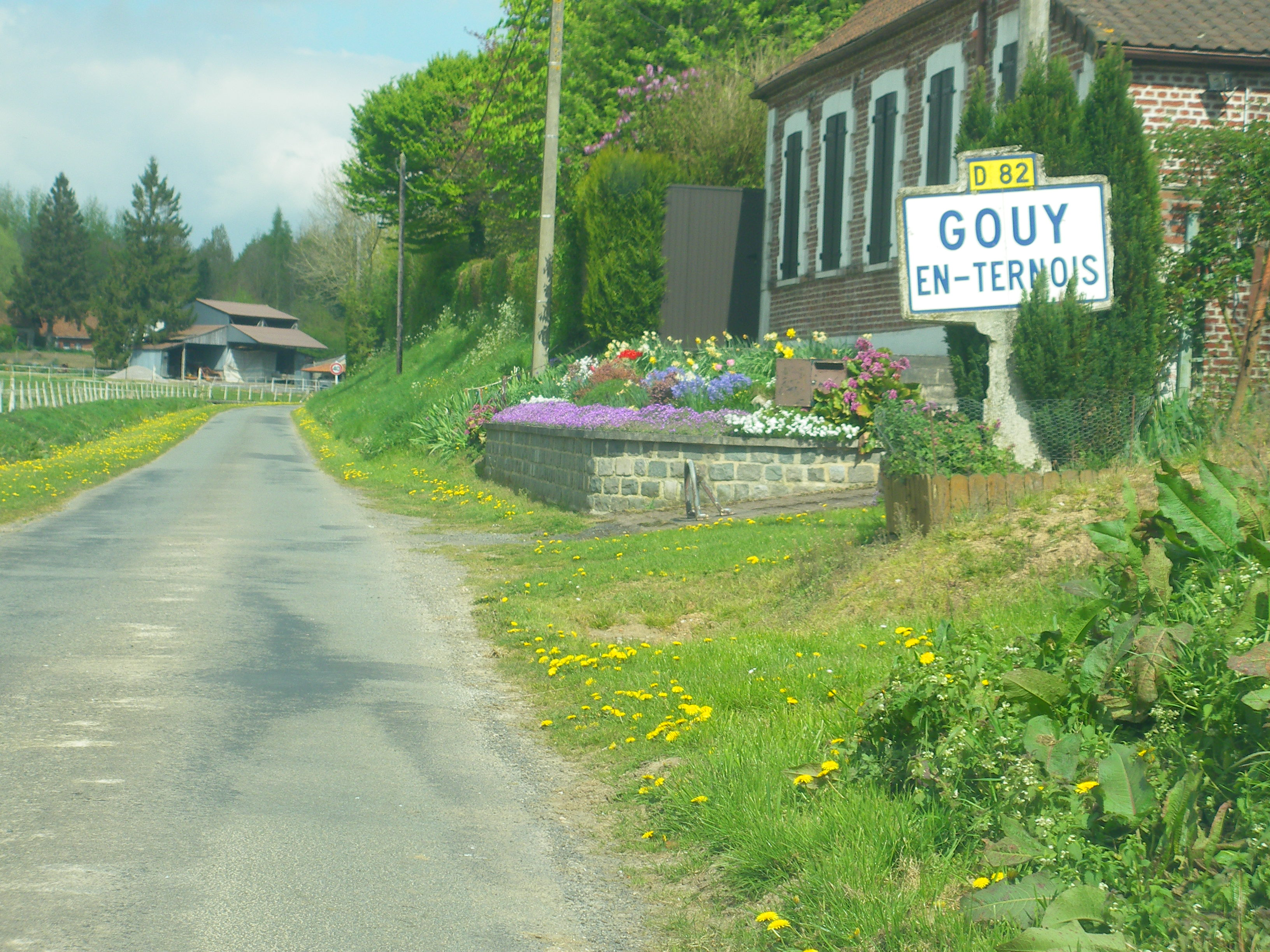
- The road into Gouy-en-Ternois

- Coat of arms
- Location of Gouy-en-Ternois
- Location within France Location within Hauts-de-France
- Coordinates: 50°19′12″N 2°24′46″E
- Country: France
- Region: Hauts-de-France
- Department: Pas-de-Calais
- Arrondissement: Arras
- Canton: Saint-Pol-sur-Ternoise
- Intercommunality: CC Ternois

Government
  - Mayor (2020–2026): Gérard Vandentorren
- Area^{1}: 5.65 km^{2} (2.18 sq mi)
- Elevation: 137 m (449 ft)
- Highest elevation: 160 m (520 ft)
- Lowest elevation: 111 m (364 ft)
- Population (2023): 127
  - Density: 22.5/km^{2} (58.2/sq mi)
- Time zone: UTC+01:00 (CET)
  - Summer (DST): UTC+02:00 (CEST)
- INSEE/Postal code: 62381 /62127
- ^{1} French Land Register data, which excludes lakes, ponds, glaciers > 1 km^{2} (0.386 sq mi or 247 acres) and river estuaries.

Gouy-en-Ternois (Picard: Gouy-in-Térnoé)is a commune in the Pas-de-Calais department in the Hauts-de-France region of France 17 miles (27 km) west of Arras.

== Population ==
Historical population
| Year | Pop. | ±% p.a. |
|---|---|---|
| 1968 | 166 | — |
| 1975 | 158 | −0.70% |
| 1982 | 150 | −0.74% |
| 1990 | 170 | +1.58% |
| 1999 | 150 | −1.38% |
| 2007 | 164 | +1.12% |
| 2012 | 165 | +0.12% |
| 2017 | 133 | −4.22% |
| 2023 | 127 | −0.77% |
Source: INSEE

== See also ==
- Communes of the Pas-de-Calais department
