= Averdoingt =

- Commune
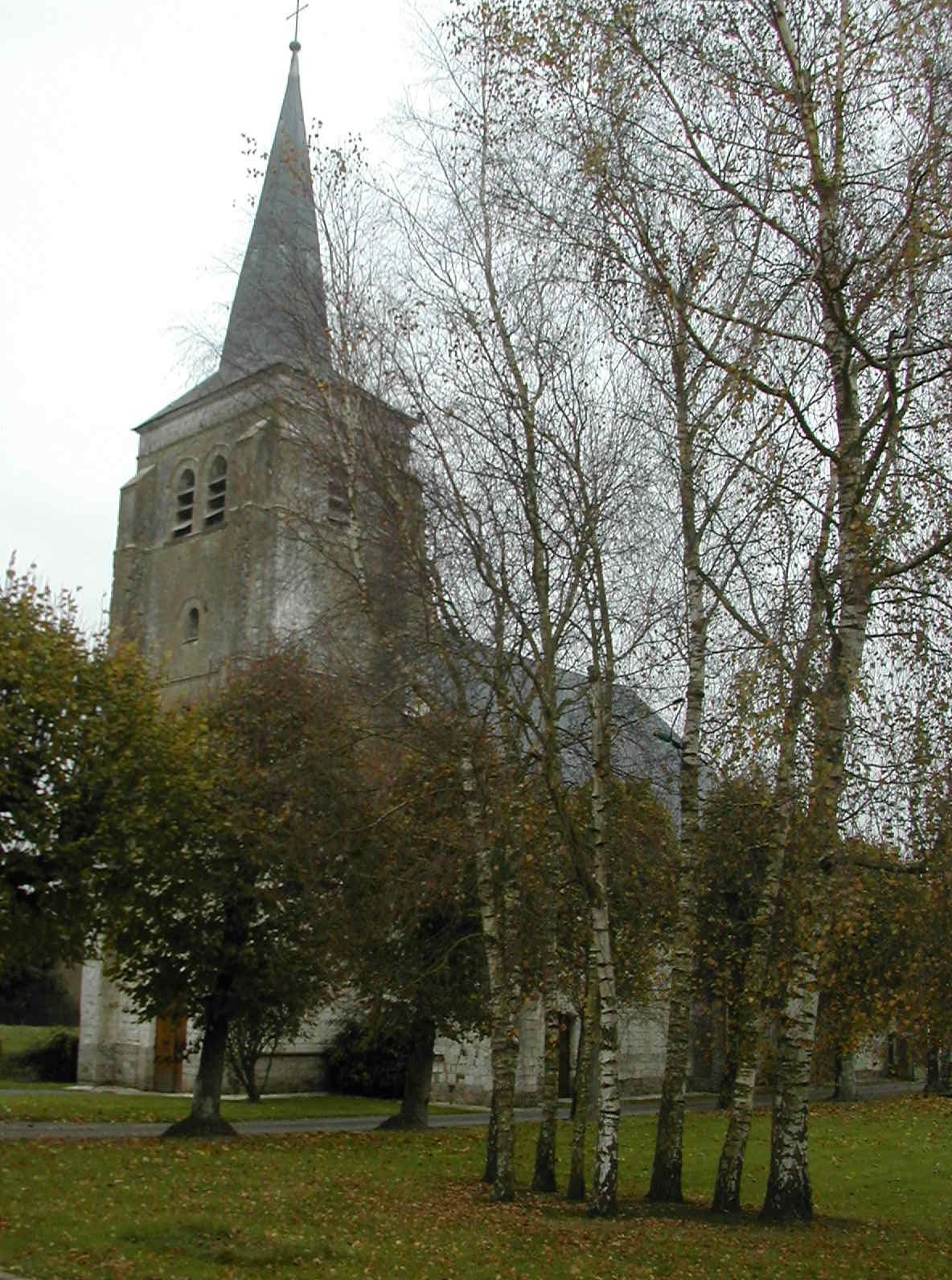
- The church of Averdoingt

- Coat of arms
- Location of Averdoingt
- Location within France Location within Hauts-de-France
- Coordinates: 50°20′43″N 2°26′34″E
- Country: France
- Region: Hauts-de-France
- Department: Pas-de-Calais
- Arrondissement: Arras
- Canton: Saint-Pol-sur-Ternoise
- Intercommunality: CC du Ternois

Government
  - Mayor (2020–2026): Damien Montel
- Area^{1}: 8.33 km^{2} (3.22 sq mi)
- Elevation: 148 m (486 ft)
- Highest elevation: 156 m (512 ft)
- Lowest elevation: 123 m (404 ft)
- Population (2023): 295
  - Density: 35.4/km^{2} (91.7/sq mi)
- Time zone: UTC+01:00 (CET)
  - Summer (DST): UTC+02:00 (CEST)
- INSEE/Postal code: 62061 /62127
- ^{1} French Land Register data, which excludes lakes, ponds, glaciers > 1 km^{2} (0.386 sq mi or 247 acres) and river estuaries.

Averdoingt (French pronunciation: [avɛʁdwɛ̃]) is a commune in the Pas-de-Calais department in northern France.

== Geography ==
A small farming village located 19 miles (30 km) west of Arras at the junction of the D81 and D81E roads.

== Population ==
Historical population
| Year | Pop. | ±% p.a. |
|---|---|---|
| 1968 | 221 | — |
| 1975 | 208 | −0.86% |
| 1982 | 207 | −0.07% |
| 1990 | 244 | +2.08% |
| 1999 | 251 | +0.31% |
| 2007 | 265 | +0.68% |
| 2012 | 279 | +1.03% |
| 2017 | 293 | +0.98% |
| 2023 | 295 | +0.11% |
Source: INSEE

== Sights ==
- The ruins of a 12th-century castle.
- The church of St. Leger, dating from the thirteenth century.

== See also ==
- Communes of the Pas-de-Calais department
