= Bours, Pas-de-Calais =

Bours
- Commune
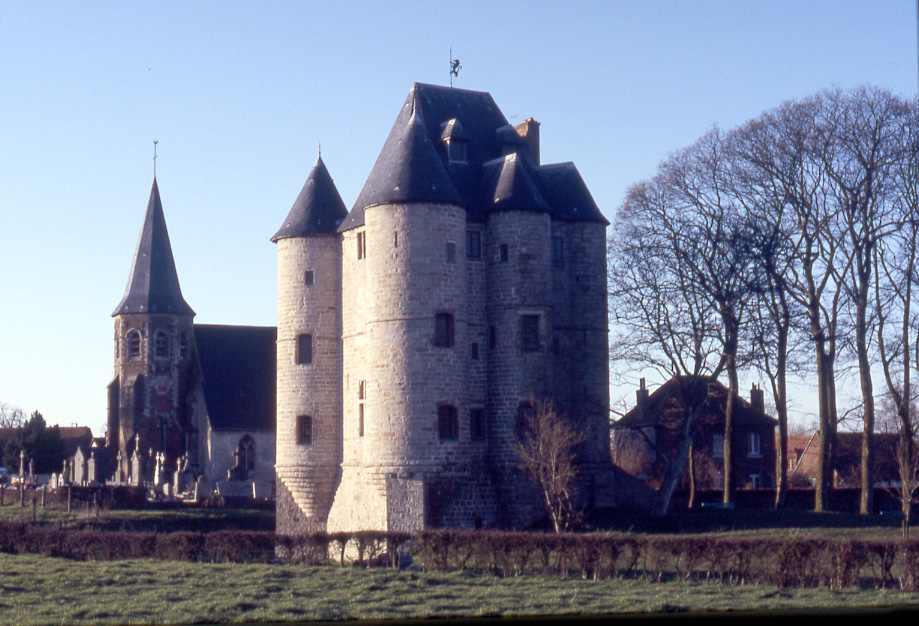
- The château of Bours
- Location of Bours
- Location within France Location within Hauts-de-France
- Coordinates: 50°27′19″N 2°24′21″E
- Country: France
- Region: Hauts-de-France
- Department: Pas-de-Calais
- Arrondissement: Arras
- Canton: Saint-Pol-sur-Ternoise
- Intercommunality: CC Ternois

Government
  - Mayor (2020–2026): Bertrand Beaucamp
- Area^{1}: 11.84 km^{2} (4.57 sq mi)
- Elevation: 171 m (561 ft)
- Highest elevation: 184 m (604 ft)
- Lowest elevation: 83 m (272 ft)
- Population (2023): 582
  - Density: 49.2/km^{2} (127/sq mi)
- Time zone: UTC+01:00 (CET)
  - Summer (DST): UTC+02:00 (CEST)
- INSEE/Postal code: 62166 /62550
- ^{1} French Land Register data, which excludes lakes, ponds, glaciers > 1 km^{2} (0.386 sq mi or 247 acres) and river estuaries.

Bours (French pronunciation: [buʁ]) is a commune in the Pas-de-Calais department in the Hauts-de-France region in northern France.

== Geography ==
A farming village located 20 miles (32 km) northwest of Arras on the D89 road, in the valley of the river Clarence.

== Population ==
Historical population
Year	Pop.	±% p.a.
1968	545	—
1975	510	−0.94%
1982	505	−0.14%
1990	524	+0.46%
1999	509	−0.32%
2007	554	+1.06%
2012	591	+1.30%
2017	617	+0.86%
2023	582	−0.97%
Source: INSEE

== Sights ==
- The church of Sainte-Austreberthe, dating from the eleventh century.

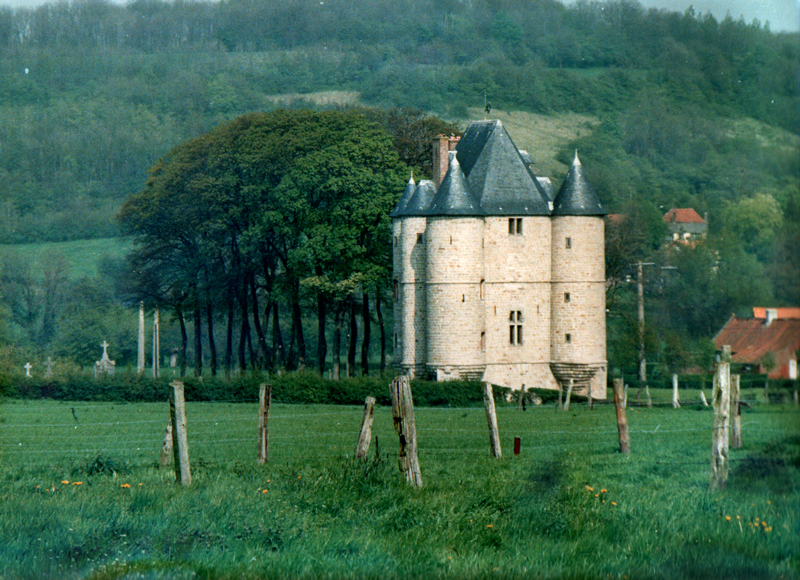

- The (restored) castle donjon, also from the eleventh century. Built of sandstone by Hugues de Bours.

== See also ==
- Communes of the Pas-de-Calais department
