= Fontaine-lès-Boulans =

- Commune
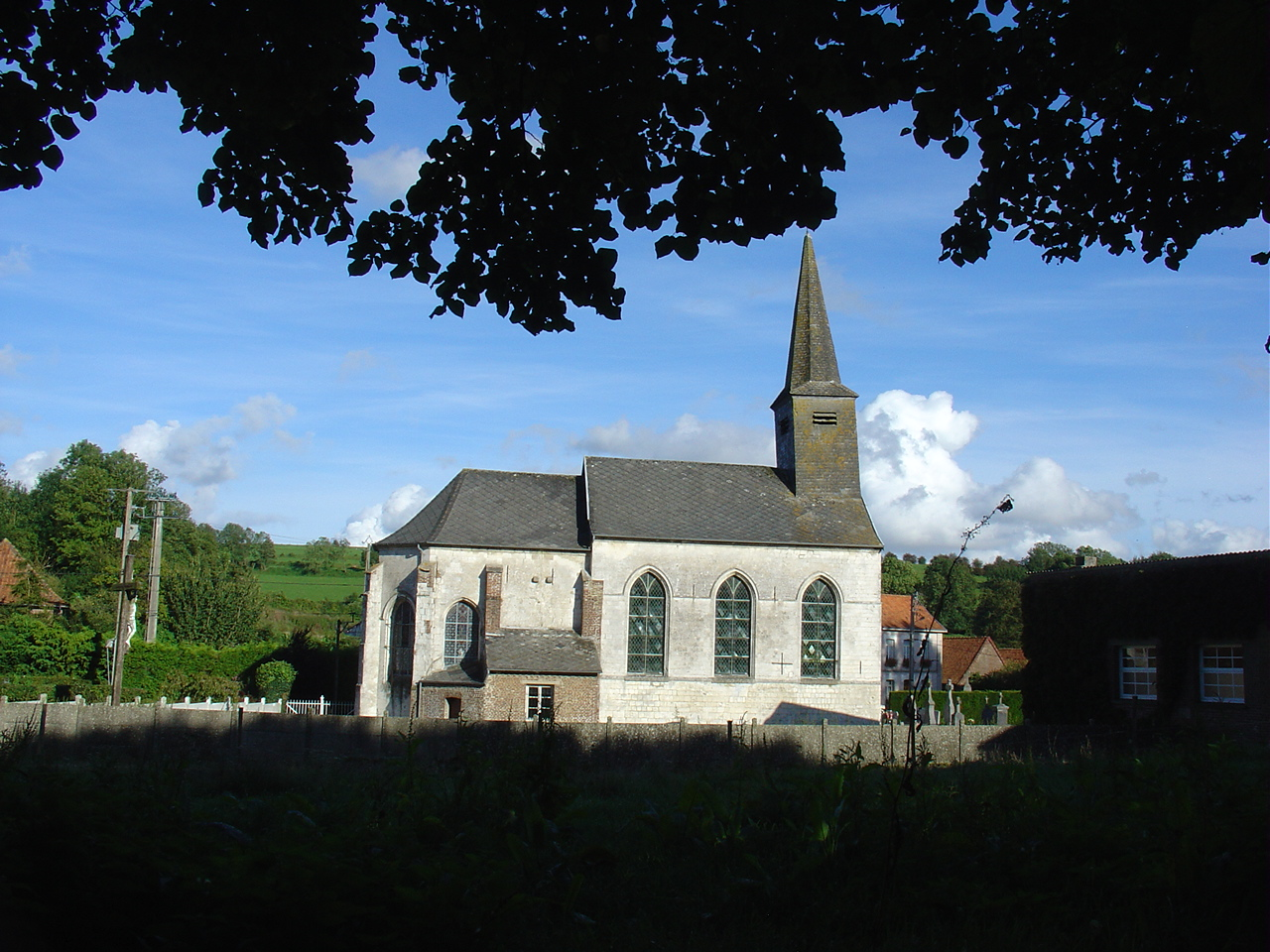
- The church of Fontaine-lès-Boulans

- Coat of arms
- Location of Fontaine-lès-Boulans
- Location within France Location within Hauts-de-France
- Coordinates: 50°29′54″N 2°16′31″E
- Country: France
- Region: Hauts-de-France
- Department: Pas-de-Calais
- Arrondissement: Arras
- Canton: Saint-Pol-sur-Ternoise
- Intercommunality: CC Ternois

Government
  - Mayor (2020–2026): Claude Coquart
- Area^{1}: 5.62 km^{2} (2.17 sq mi)
- Elevation: 113 m (371 ft)
- Highest elevation: 181 m (594 ft)
- Lowest elevation: 100 m (330 ft)
- Population (2023): 97
  - Density: 17/km^{2} (45/sq mi)
- Time zone: UTC+01:00 (CET)
  - Summer (DST): UTC+02:00 (CEST)
- INSEE/Postal code: 62342 /62134
- ^{1} French Land Register data, which excludes lakes, ponds, glaciers > 1 km^{2} (0.386 sq mi or 247 acres) and river estuaries.

Fontaine-lès-Boulans (French pronunciation: [fɔ̃tɛn lɛ bulɑ̃]; Picard: Fontanne-lès-Boulans) is a commune in the Pas-de-Calais department in the Hauts-de-France region of France.

== Geography ==
A small farming village situated 32 miles (51 km) northwest of Arras, at the junction of the D93 and the D94 roads.

== Population ==
Historical population
Year	Pop.	±% p.a.
1968	126	—
1975	114	−1.42%
1982	89	−3.47%
1990	87	−0.28%
1999	90	+0.38%
2007	88	−0.28%
2012	91	+0.67%
2017	100	+1.90%
2023	97	−0.51%
Source: INSEE

== Places of interest ==
- The church of St.Berthe, dating from the nineteenth century.
- An eighteenth-century chateau.

== See also ==
- Communes of the Pas-de-Calais department
