= Eps, Pas-de-Calais =

Eps
- Commune
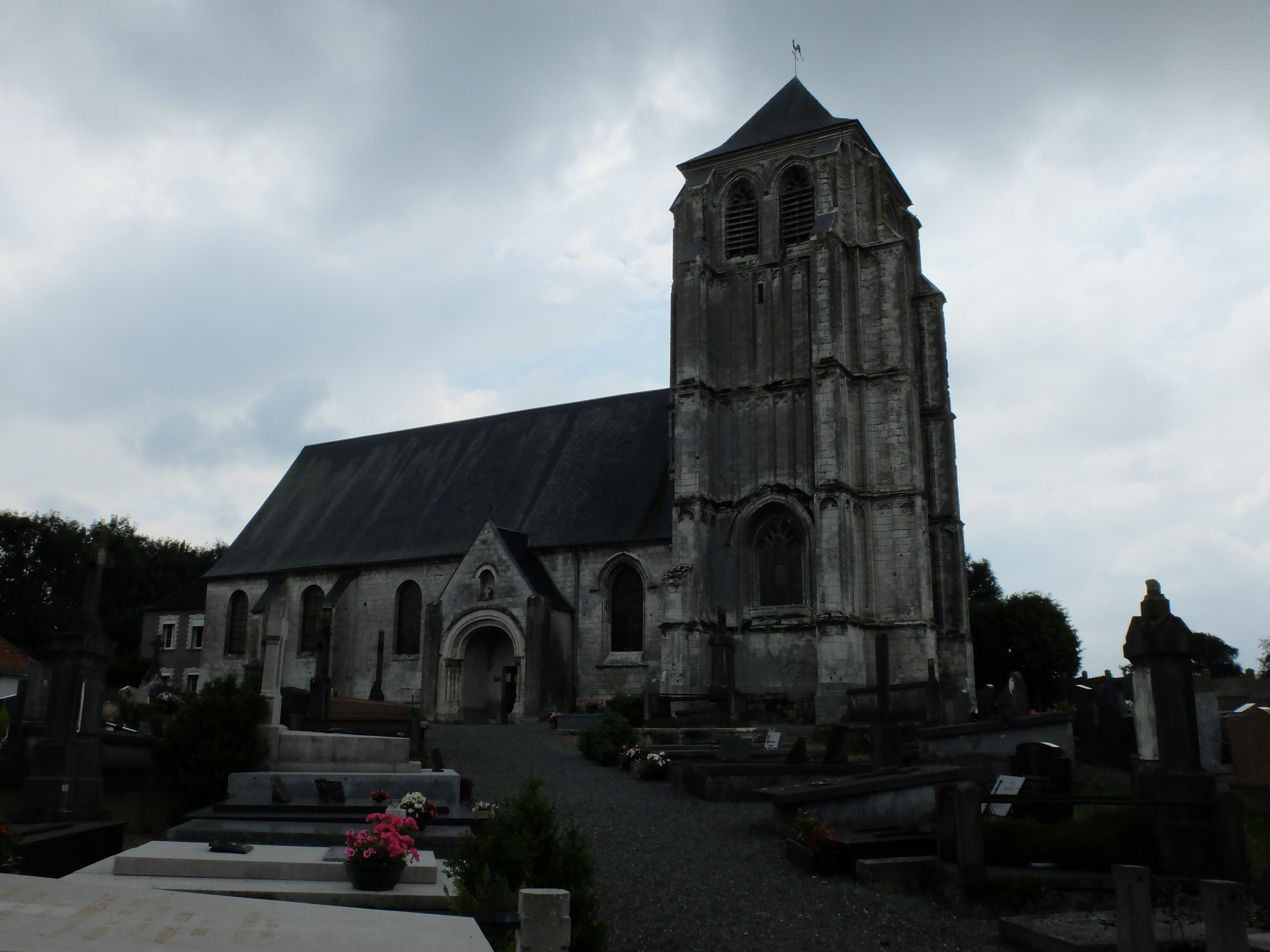
- The church of Eps

- Coat of arms
- Location of Eps
- Location within France Location within Hauts-de-France
- Coordinates: 50°27′20″N 2°17′48″E
- Country: France
- Region: Hauts-de-France
- Department: Pas-de-Calais
- Arrondissement: Arras
- Canton: Saint-Pol-sur-Ternoise
- Intercommunality: CC Ternois

Government
  - Mayor (2020–2026): Philippe Mayeur
- Area^{1}: 6.87 km^{2} (2.65 sq mi)
- Elevation: 76 m (249 ft)
- Highest elevation: 155 m (509 ft)
- Lowest elevation: 59 m (194 ft)
- Population (2023): 238
  - Density: 34.6/km^{2} (89.7/sq mi)
- Time zone: UTC+01:00 (CET)
  - Summer (DST): UTC+02:00 (CEST)
- INSEE/Postal code: 62299 /62134
- ^{1} French Land Register data, which excludes lakes, ponds, glaciers > 1 km^{2} (0.386 sq mi or 247 acres) and river estuaries.

Eps is a commune in the Pas-de-Calais department in the Hauts-de-France region of France.

== Geography ==
A farming village situated 27 miles (43 km) northwest of Arras at the junction of the D70 and D71 roads.

== Places of interest ==
- The church of St. Martin, dating from the sixteenth century.

== See also ==
- Communes of the Pas-de-Calais department
