= Ramecourt, Pas-de-Calais =

Ramecourt
- Commune
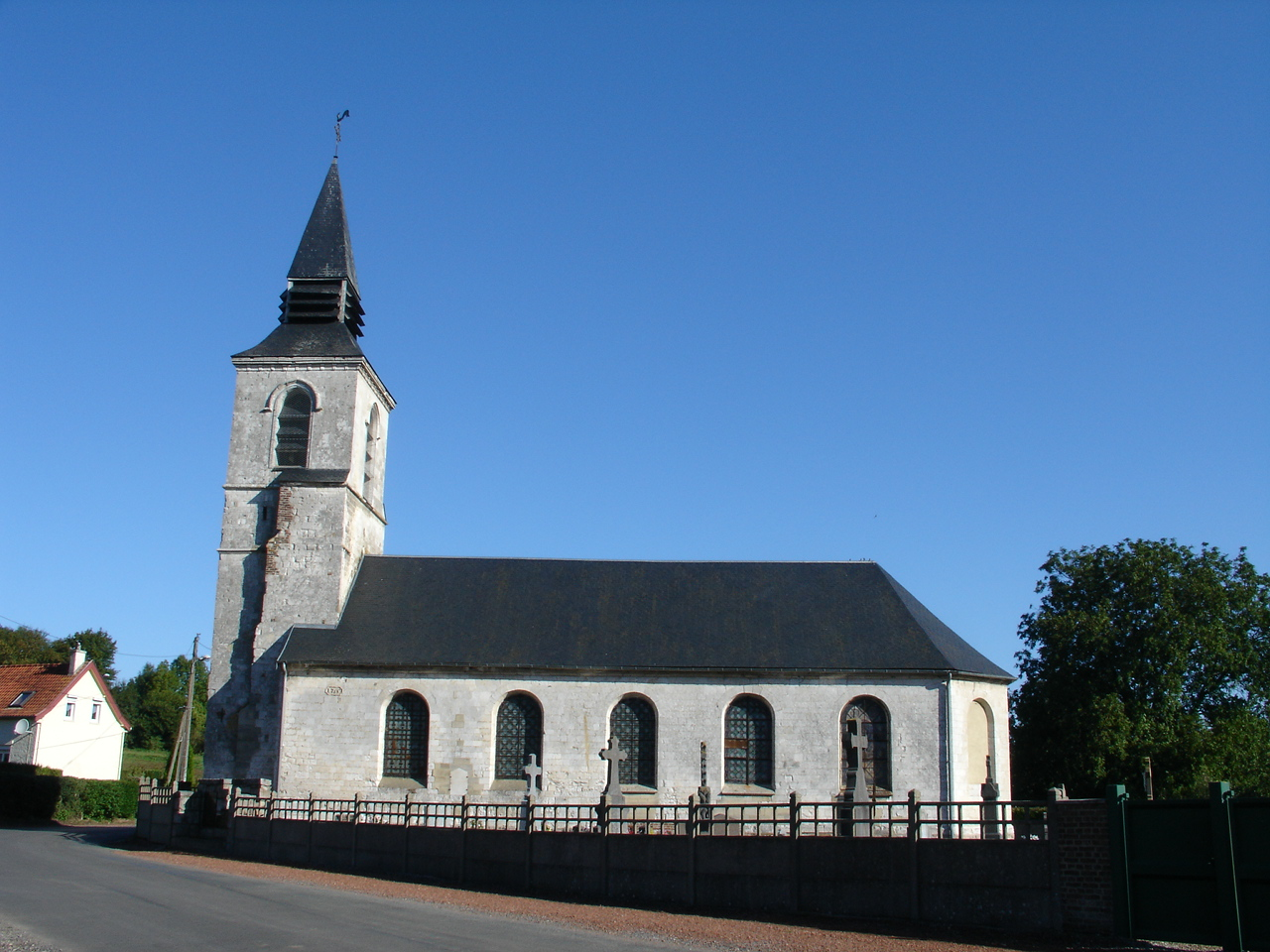
- The church of Ramecourt

- Coat of arms
- Location of Ramecourt
- Location within France Location within Hauts-de-France
- Coordinates: 50°22′16″N 2°18′49″E
- Country: France
- Region: Hauts-de-France
- Department: Pas-de-Calais
- Arrondissement: Arras
- Canton: Saint-Pol-sur-Ternoise
- Intercommunality: CC Ternois

Government
  - Mayor (2020–2026): Denis Dequidt
- Area^{1}: 8.09 km^{2} (3.12 sq mi)
- Elevation: 97 m (318 ft)
- Highest elevation: 146 m (479 ft)
- Lowest elevation: 85 m (279 ft)
- Population (2023): 349
  - Density: 43.1/km^{2} (112/sq mi)
- Time zone: UTC+01:00 (CET)
  - Summer (DST): UTC+02:00 (CEST)
- INSEE/Postal code: 62686 /62130
- ^{1} French Land Register data, which excludes lakes, ponds, glaciers > 1 km^{2} (0.386 sq mi or 247 acres) and river estuaries.

Ramecourt (French pronunciation: [ʁamkuʁ]) is a commune in the Pas-de-Calais department in the Hauts-de-France region of France.

== Geography ==
Ramecourt is a suburb of Saint-Pol-sur-Ternoise, situated 25 miles (40 km) west of Arras, at the junction of the D101 and D102 roads.

== Population ==
Historical population
Year	Pop.	±% p.a.
1968	303	—
1975	313	+0.46%
1982	298	−0.70%
1990	324	+1.05%
1999	341	+0.57%
2007	328	−0.48%
2012	320	−0.49%
2017	382	+3.61%
2023	349	−1.49%
Source: INSEE

== Places of interest ==
- The church of St.Leger, dating from the seventeenth century.
- The eighteenth-century chateau.

== See also ==
- Communes of the Pas-de-Calais department
