= Fiefs, Pas-de-Calais =

Fiefs
- Commune
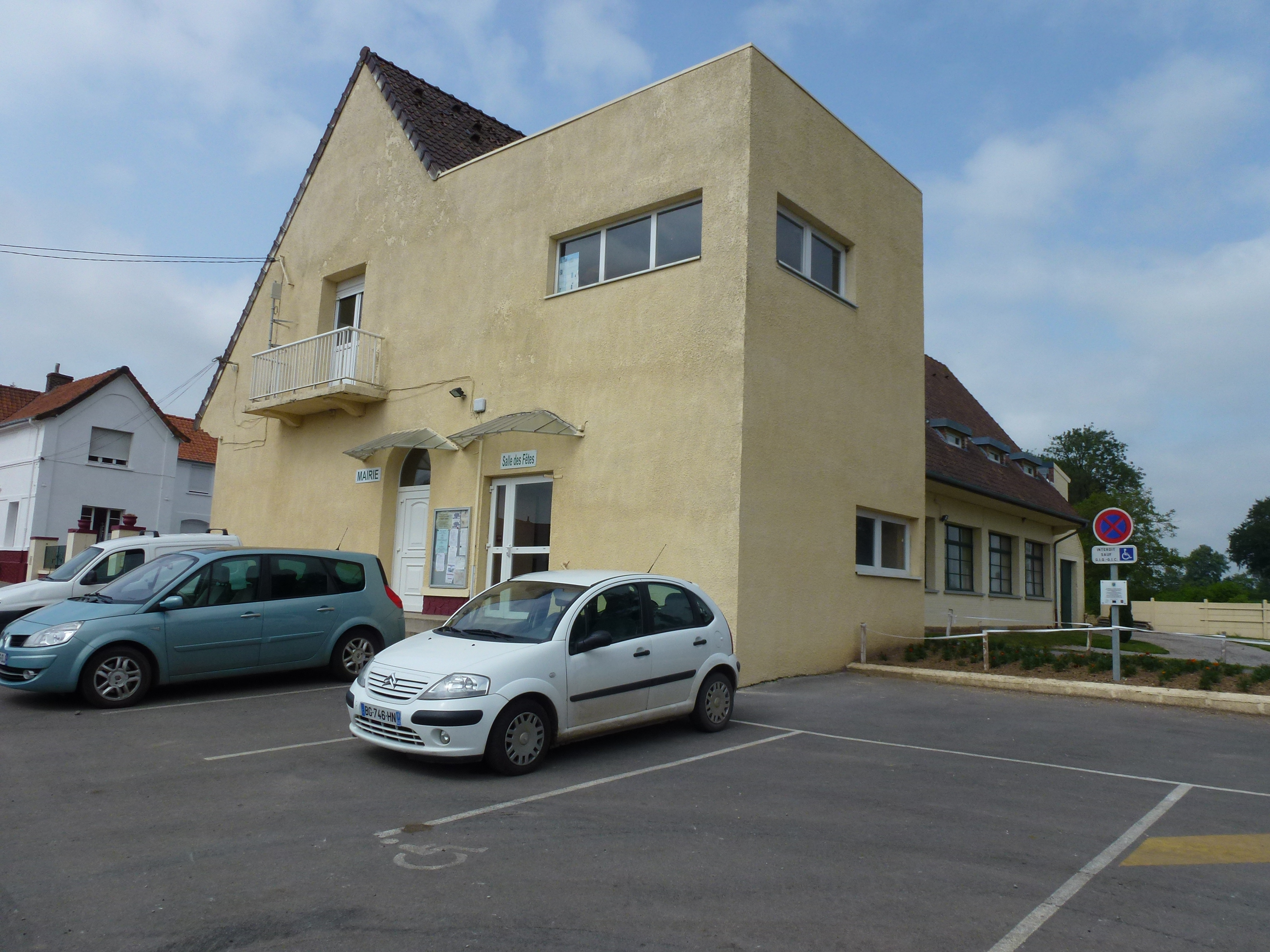
- The town hall of Fiefs

- Coat of arms
- Location of Fiefs
- Location within France Location within Hauts-de-France
- Coordinates: 50°30′16″N 2°19′38″E
- Country: France
- Region: Hauts-de-France
- Department: Pas-de-Calais
- Arrondissement: Arras
- Canton: Saint-Pol-sur-Ternoise
- Intercommunality: CC Ternois

Government
  - Mayor (2020–2026): René Choquet
- Area^{1}: 10.97 km^{2} (4.24 sq mi)
- Elevation: 195 m (640 ft)
- Highest elevation: 196 m (643 ft)
- Lowest elevation: 110 m (360 ft)
- Population (2023): 354
  - Density: 32.3/km^{2} (83.6/sq mi)
- Time zone: UTC+01:00 (CET)
  - Summer (DST): UTC+02:00 (CEST)
- INSEE/Postal code: 62333 /62134
- ^{1} French Land Register data, which excludes lakes, ponds, glaciers > 1 km^{2} (0.386 sq mi or 247 acres) and river estuaries.

Fiefs is a commune in the Pas-de-Calais department in the Hauts-de-France region of France 26 miles (42 km) northwest of Arras.

== Population ==
The inhabitants are called Fieffois in French.

Historical population
Year	Pop.	±% p.a.
1968	400	—
1975	366	−1.26%
1982	334	−1.30%
1990	304	−1.17%
1999	329	+0.88%
2007	376	+1.68%
2012	393	+0.89%
2017	385	−0.41%
2023	354	−1.39%
Source: INSEE

== See also ==
- Communes of the Pas-de-Calais department
