= Bermicourt =

- Commune
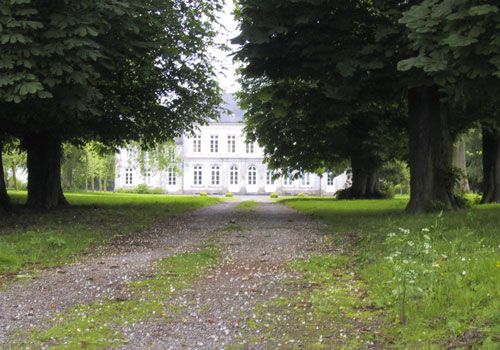
- Chateau de Bermicourt

- Coat of arms
- Location of Bermicourt
- Location within France Location within Hauts-de-France
- Coordinates: 50°24′35″N 2°13′51″E
- Country: France
- Region: Hauts-de-France
- Department: Pas-de-Calais
- Arrondissement: Arras
- Canton: Saint-Pol-sur-Ternoise
- Intercommunality: CC du Ternois

Government
  - Mayor (2020–2026): Arnaud Fauquembergue
- Area^{1}: 5.53 km^{2} (2.14 sq mi)
- Elevation: 135 m (443 ft)
- Highest elevation: 142 m (466 ft)
- Lowest elevation: 95 m (312 ft)
- Population (2023): 164
  - Density: 29.7/km^{2} (76.8/sq mi)
- Time zone: UTC+01:00 (CET)
  - Summer (DST): UTC+02:00 (CEST)
- INSEE/Postal code: 62114 /62130
- ^{1} French Land Register data, which excludes lakes, ponds, glaciers > 1 km^{2} (0.386 sq mi or 247 acres) and river estuaries.

Bermicourt (French pronunciation: [bɛʁmikuʁ]) is a commune in the Pas-de-Calais department in the Hauts-de-France region in northern France.

== Geography ==
A small farming village located 28 miles (47 km) northwest of Arras on the D98 road.

== History ==
On 15 September 1916, during the First World War, shortly before Haig's attack on Flers, the British Tank Corps, equipped with its new 'secret weapon', the tank, and commanded by General Hugh Elles set up its headquarters at Chateau de Bermicourt. At that time the chateau belonged to Count Jean de Hauteclocque. The headquarters remained stationed there until the end of the war.

== Population ==
Historical population
Year	Pop.	±% p.a.
1968	159	—
1975	146	−1.21%
1982	143	−0.30%
1990	127	−1.47%
1999	128	+0.09%
2007	152	+2.17%
2012	153	+0.13%
2017	165	+1.52%
2023	164	−0.10%
Source: INSEE

== Sights ==
- The church of Notre-Dame, dating from the sixteenth century.
- The château.

== See also ==
- Communes of the Pas-de-Calais department
