= Fleury, Pas-de-Calais =

Fleury
- Commune
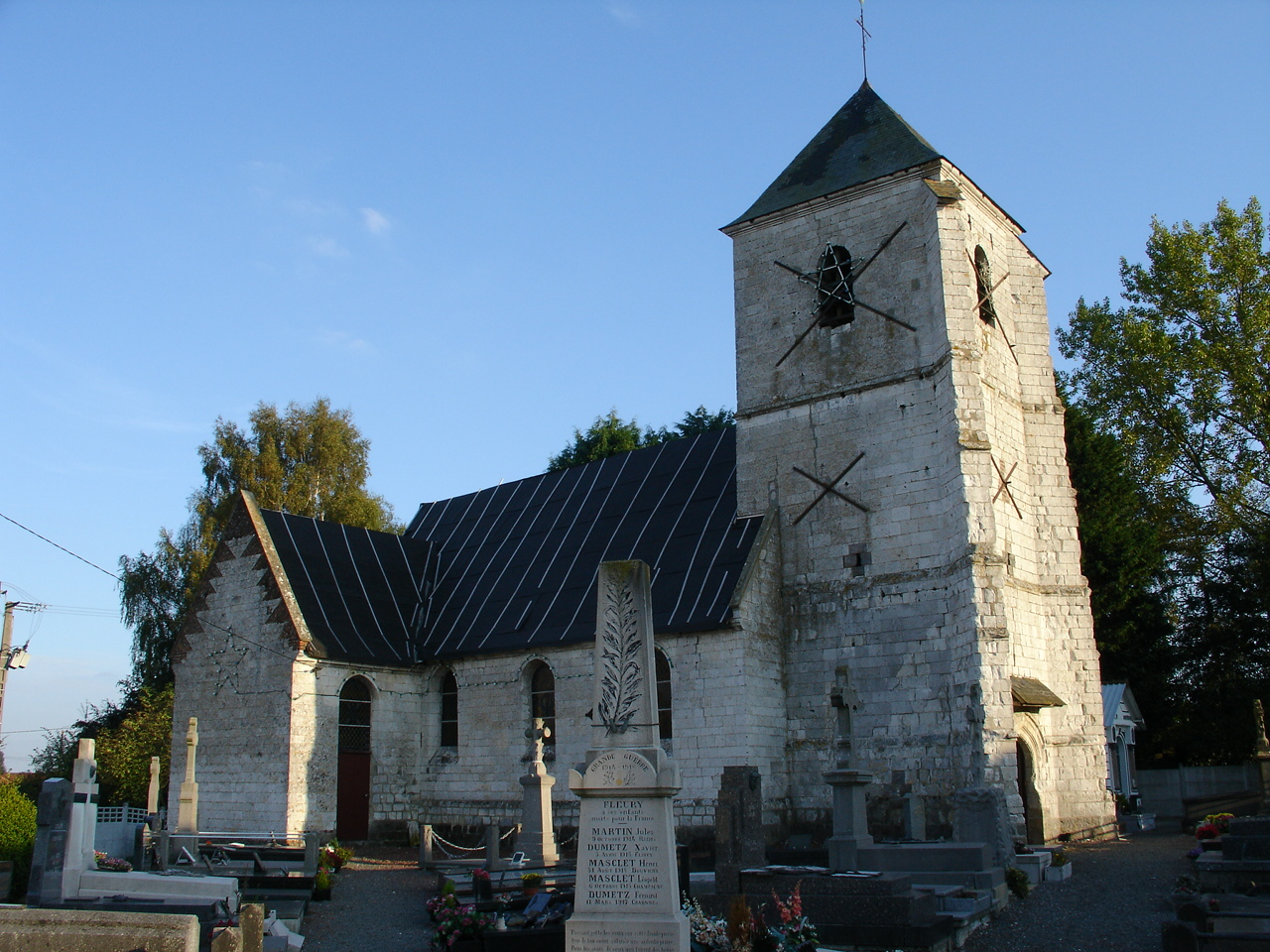
- The church of Fleury

- Coat of arms
- Location of Fleury
- Location within France Location within Hauts-de-France
- Coordinates: 50°25′22″N 2°15′21″E
- Country: France
- Region: Hauts-de-France
- Department: Pas-de-Calais
- Arrondissement: Arras
- Canton: Saint-Pol-sur-Ternoise
- Intercommunality: CC Ternois

Government
  - Mayor (2020–2026): Jean-Noël Voiseux
- Area^{1}: 2.75 km^{2} (1.06 sq mi)
- Elevation: 80 m (260 ft)
- Highest elevation: 131 m (430 ft)
- Lowest elevation: 86 m (282 ft)
- Population (2023): 109
  - Density: 39.6/km^{2} (103/sq mi)
- Time zone: UTC+01:00 (CET)
  - Summer (DST): UTC+02:00 (CEST)
- INSEE/Postal code: 62339 /62134
- ^{1} French Land Register data, which excludes lakes, ponds, glaciers > 1 km^{2} (0.386 sq mi or 247 acres) and river estuaries.

Fleury (French pronunciation: [flœʁi]) is a commune in the Pas-de-Calais department in the Hauts-de-France region of France 29 miles (47 km) northwest of Arras.

== Population ==
Historical population
Year	Pop.	±% p.a.
1968	156	—
1975	113	−4.50%
1982	127	+1.68%
1990	101	−2.82%
1999	90	−1.27%
2007	95	+0.68%
2012	133	+6.96%
2017	122	−1.71%
2023	109	−1.86%
Source: INSEE

== See also ==
- Communes of the Pas-de-Calais department
