= Hautecloque, Pas-de-Calais =

Hautecloque
- Commune
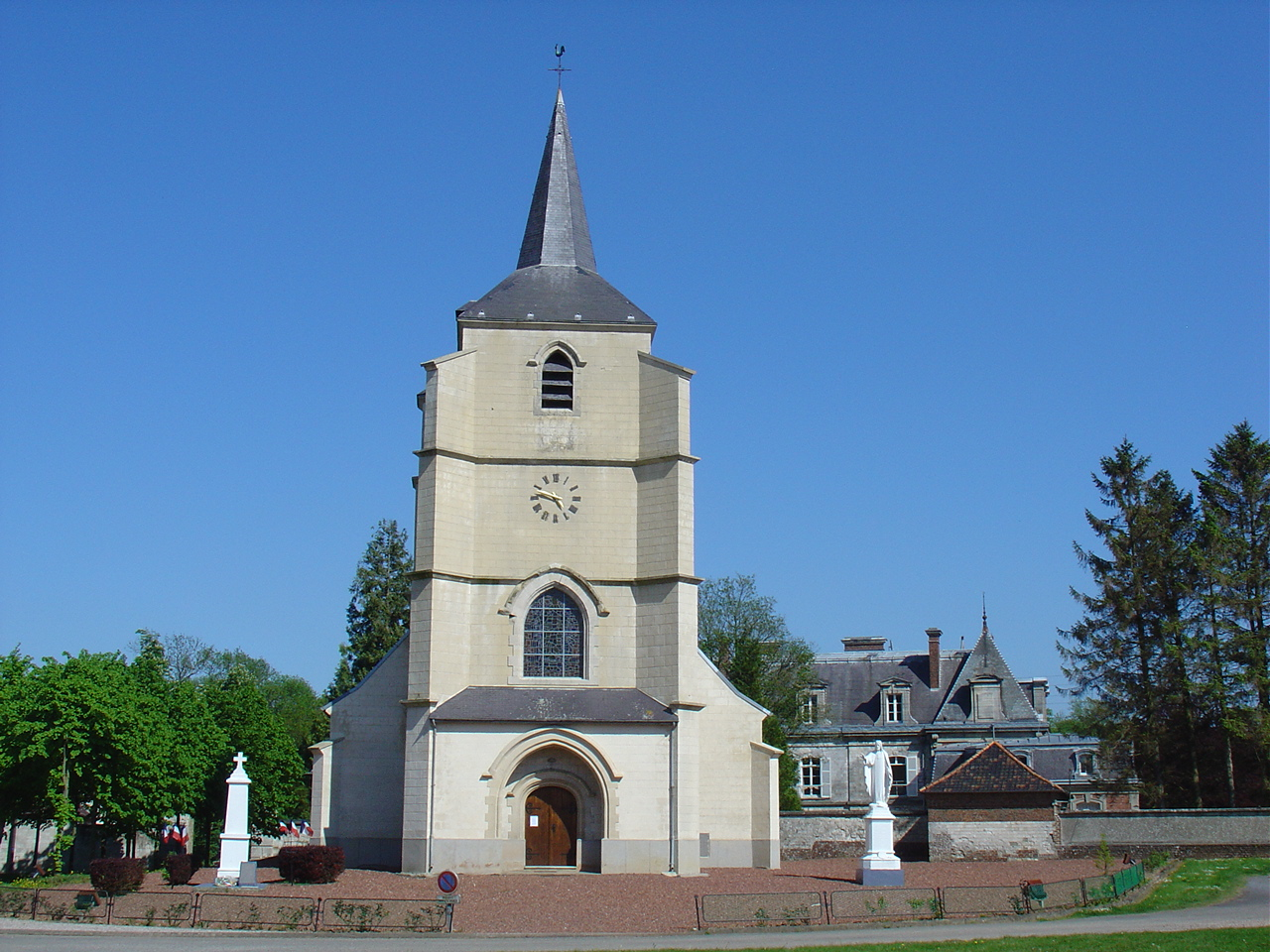
- The church of Hautecloque

- Coat of arms
- Location of Hautecloque
- Location within France Location within Hauts-de-France
- Coordinates: 50°20′22″N 2°18′24″E
- Country: France
- Region: Hauts-de-France
- Department: Pas-de-Calais
- Arrondissement: Arras
- Canton: Saint-Pol-sur-Ternoise
- Intercommunality: CC Ternois

Government
  - Mayor (2020–2026): Marc Bridoux
- Area^{1}: 6.84 km^{2} (2.64 sq mi)
- Elevation: 150 m (490 ft)
- Highest elevation: 152 m (499 ft)
- Lowest elevation: 108 m (354 ft)
- Population (2023): 214
  - Density: 31.3/km^{2} (81.0/sq mi)
- Time zone: UTC+01:00 (CET)
  - Summer (DST): UTC+02:00 (CEST)
- INSEE/Postal code: 62416 /62130
- ^{1} French Land Register data, which excludes lakes, ponds, glaciers > 1 km^{2} (0.386 sq mi or 247 acres) and river estuaries.

Hautecloque (French pronunciation: [otklɔk]) is a commune in the Pas-de-Calais department in the Hauts-de-France region of France 23 miles (37 km) west of Arras.

== Population ==
Historical population
Year	Pop.	±% p.a.
1968	198	—
1975	194	−0.29%
1982	202	+0.58%
1990	179	−1.50%
1999	186	+0.43%
2007	212	+1.65%
2012	221	+0.83%
2017	218	−0.27%
2023	214	−0.31%
Source: INSEE

== See also ==
- Communes of the Pas-de-Calais department
