= Communauté de communes de la Région de Frévent =

Coordinates: 50.2745°N 2.2919°E

Région de Frévent
- Former communauté de communes
- Interactive map of Région de Frévent
- Country: France
- Region: Hauts-de-France
- Department: Pas-de-Calais
- No. of communes: {{{nbcomm}}}
- Established: 1999
- Disbanded: 2017
- Population (1999): 6,647

The Communauté de communes de la Région de Frévent was located in the Pas-de-Calais département, in northern France. It was created in January 1999. It was merged into the new Communauté de communes du Ternois in January 2017.

== Composition ==
It comprised the following 12 communes:

- Frévent
- Bonnières
- Boubers-sur-Canche
- Nuncq-Hautecôte
- Bouret-sur-Canche
- Ligny-sur-Canche
- Conchy-sur-Canche
- Fortel-en-Artois
- Aubrometz
- Vacquerie-le-Boucq
- Monchel-sur-Canche
- Canteleux
