= Marquay =

Marquay is the name of two communes in France:

- Marquay, Dordogne
- Marquay, Pas-de-Calais
