= Canton of Saint-Pol-sur-Ternoise =

Coordinates: 50.37972°N 2.33556°E

Saint-Pol-sur-Ternoise
- Canton
- Location of Saint-Pol-sur-Ternoise within the department
- Country: France
- Region: Hauts-de-France
- Department: Pas-de-Calais
- No. of communes: {{{nbcomm}}}
- Area: 513.01 km^{2} (198.07 sq mi)
- Population (2023): 32,069
  - Density: 62.511/km^{2} (161.90/sq mi)
- INSEE code: 62 38

The Canton of Saint-Pol-sur-Ternoise is a canton situated in the Pas-de-Calais département and in the Hauts-de-France region of France.

== Geography ==
This canton is centred on the town of Saint-Pol-sur-Ternoise in the arrondissement of Arras.

== Composition ==
At the French canton reorganisation which came into effect in March 2015, the canton was expanded from 42 to 87 communes:

- Anvin
- Aubrometz
- Aumerval
- Averdoingt
- Bailleul-lès-Pernes
- Beauvois
- Bergueneuse
- Bermicourt
- Blangerval-Blangermont
- Bonnières
- Boubers-sur-Canche
- Bouret-sur-Canche
- Bours
- Boyaval
- Brias
- Buneville
- Conchy-sur-Canche
- Conteville-en-Ternois
- Croisette
- Croix-en-Ternois
- Écoivres
- Eps
- Équirre
- Érin
- Fiefs
- Flers
- Fleury
- Floringhem
- Fontaine-lès-Boulans
- Fontaine-lès-Hermans
- Fortel-en-Artois
- Foufflin-Ricametz
- Framecourt
- Frévent
- Gauchin-Verloingt
- Gouy-en-Ternois
- Guinecourt
- Hautecloque
- Héricourt
- Herlincourt
- Herlin-le-Sec
- Hernicourt
- Hestrus
- Heuchin
- Huclier
- Humerœuille
- Humières
- Ligny-sur-Canche
- Ligny-Saint-Flochel
- Linzeux
- Lisbourg
- Maisnil
- Marest
- Marquay
- Moncheaux-lès-Frévent
- Monchel-sur-Canche
- Monchy-Breton
- Monchy-Cayeux
- Monts-en-Ternois
- Nédon
- Nédonchel
- Neuville-au-Cornet
- Nuncq-Hautecôte
- Œuf-en-Ternois
- Ostreville
- Pernes
- Pierremont
- Prédefin
- Pressy
- Ramecourt
- Roëllecourt
- Sachin
- Sains-lès-Pernes
- Saint-Michel-sur-Ternoise
- Saint-Pol-sur-Ternoise
- Séricourt
- Sibiville
- Siracourt
- Tangry
- Teneur
- Ternas
- La Thieuloye
- Tilly-Capelle
- Troisvaux
- Vacquerie-le-Boucq
- Valhuon
- Wavrans-sur-Ternoise

== Population ==
Historical population
Year	Pop.	±% p.a.
2013	33,281	—
2018	33,183	−0.06%
Source: INSEE

== See also ==
- Arrondissement of Arras
- Cantons of Pas-de-Calais
- Communes of Pas-de-Calais
