= Ternas =

- Commune
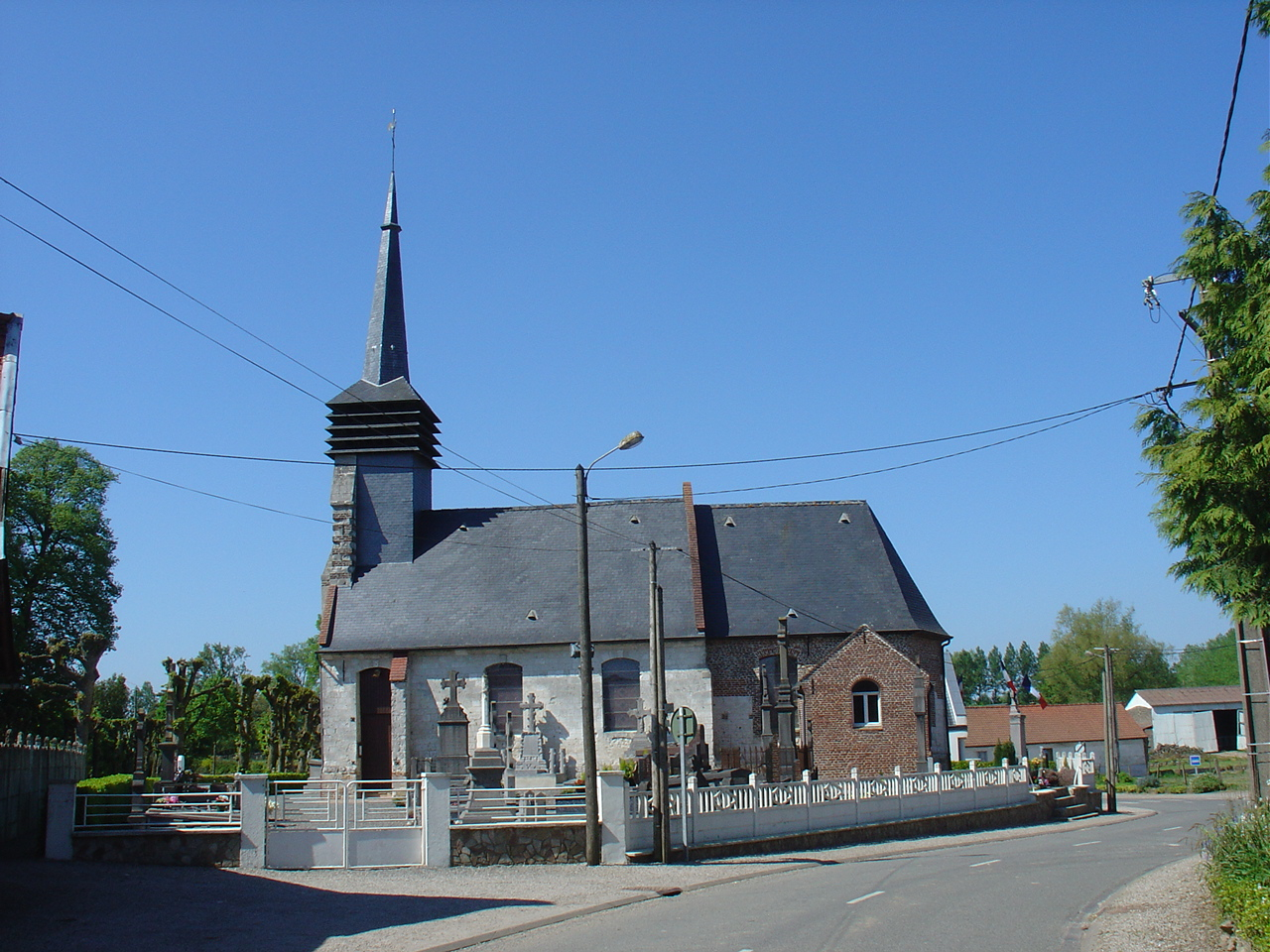
- The church of Ternas

- Coat of arms
- Location of Ternas
- Location within France Location within Hauts-de-France
- Coordinates: 50°20′36″N 2°23′54″E
- Country: France
- Region: Hauts-de-France
- Department: Pas-de-Calais
- Arrondissement: Arras
- Canton: Saint-Pol-sur-Ternoise
- Intercommunality: CC Ternois

Government
  - Mayor (2020–2026): Guillaume Gay
- Area^{1}: 2.51 km^{2} (0.97 sq mi)
- Elevation: 151 m (495 ft)
- Highest elevation: 160 m (520 ft)
- Lowest elevation: 137 m (449 ft)
- Population (2023): 125
  - Density: 49.8/km^{2} (129/sq mi)
- Time zone: UTC+01:00 (CET)
  - Summer (DST): UTC+02:00 (CEST)
- INSEE/Postal code: 62809 /62127
- ^{1} French Land Register data, which excludes lakes, ponds, glaciers > 1 km^{2} (0.386 sq mi or 247 acres) and river estuaries.

Ternas (West Flemish: Ternast) is a commune in the Pas-de-Calais department in the Hauts-de-France region of France 23 miles (37 km) west of Arras.

== Population ==
Historical population
Year	Pop.	±% p.a.
1968	140	—
1975	125	−1.61%
1982	134	+1.00%
1990	117	−1.68%
1999	118	+0.09%
2007	135	+1.70%
2012	132	−0.45%
2017	137	+0.75%
2023	125	−1.52%
Source: INSEE

== See also ==
- Communes of the Pas-de-Calais department
