= Herlincourt =

- Commune
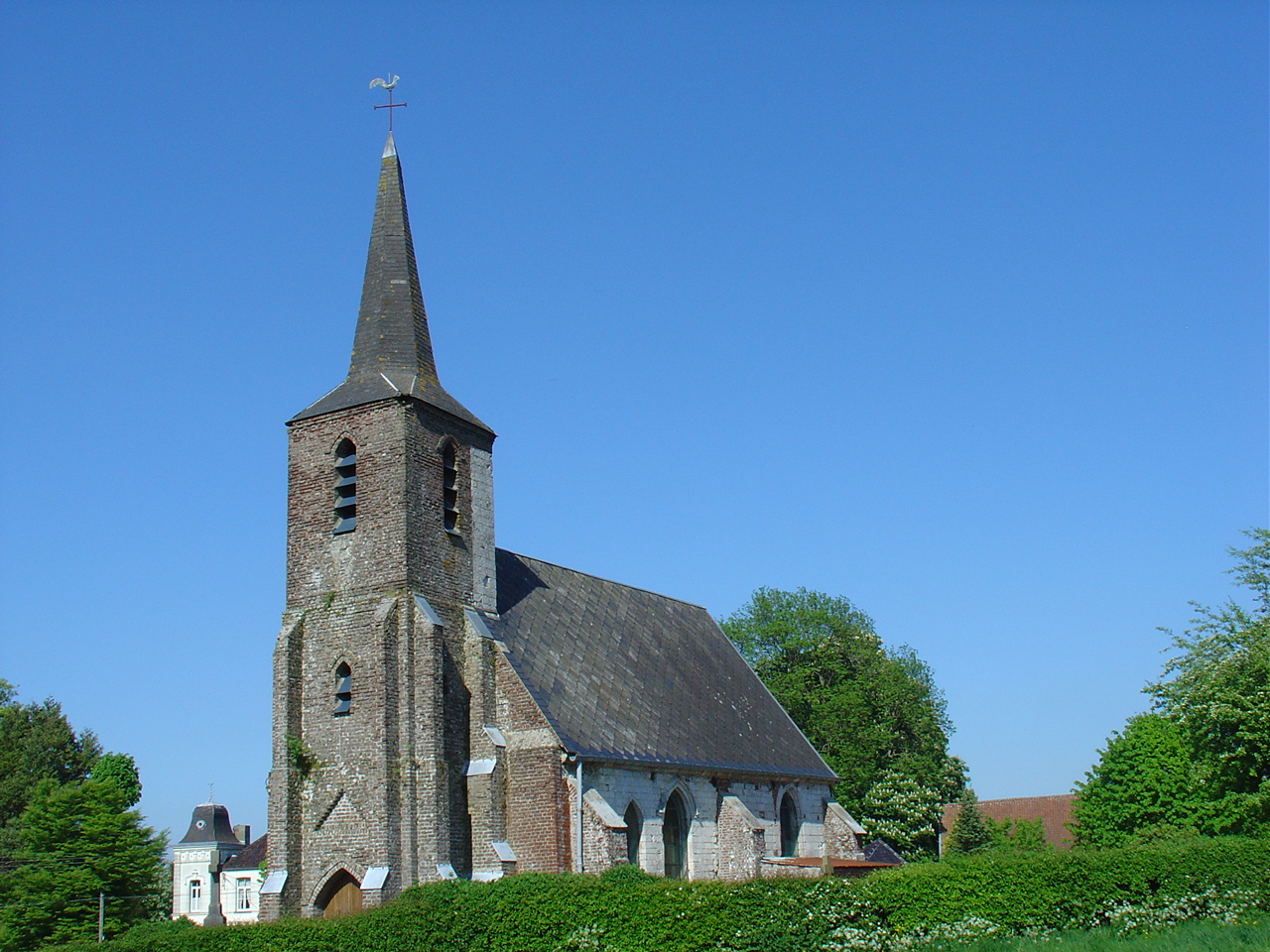
- The church of Herlincourt

- Coat of arms
- Location of Herlincourt
- Location within France Location within Hauts-de-France
- Coordinates: 50°20′44″N 2°18′06″E
- Country: France
- Region: Hauts-de-France
- Department: Pas-de-Calais
- Arrondissement: Arras
- Canton: Saint-Pol-sur-Ternoise
- Intercommunality: CC Ternois

Government
  - Mayor (2020–2026): Philippe Armand
- Area^{1}: 2.95 km^{2} (1.14 sq mi)
- Elevation: 110 m (360 ft)
- Highest elevation: 146 m (479 ft)
- Lowest elevation: 108 m (354 ft)
- Population (2023): 106
  - Density: 35.9/km^{2} (93.1/sq mi)
- Time zone: UTC+01:00 (CET)
  - Summer (DST): UTC+02:00 (CEST)
- INSEE/Postal code: 62435 /62130
- ^{1} French Land Register data, which excludes lakes, ponds, glaciers > 1 km^{2} (0.386 sq mi or 247 acres) and river estuaries.

Herlincourt (French pronunciation: [ɛʁlɛ̃kuʁ]) is a commune in the Pas-de-Calais department in the Hauts-de-France region of France 35 km (22 mi) west of Arras, 5 km (3 mi) south of Saint-Pol-sur-Ternoise.

== Population ==
Historical population
Year	Pop.	±% p.a.
1968	92	—
1975	67	−4.43%
1982	94	+4.96%
1990	110	+1.98%
1999	112	+0.20%
2007	104	−0.92%
2012	112	+1.49%
2017	104	−1.47%
2023	106	+0.32%
Source: INSEE

== See also ==
- Communes of the Pas-de-Calais department
