= Floringhem =

Floringhem Florigem
- Commune
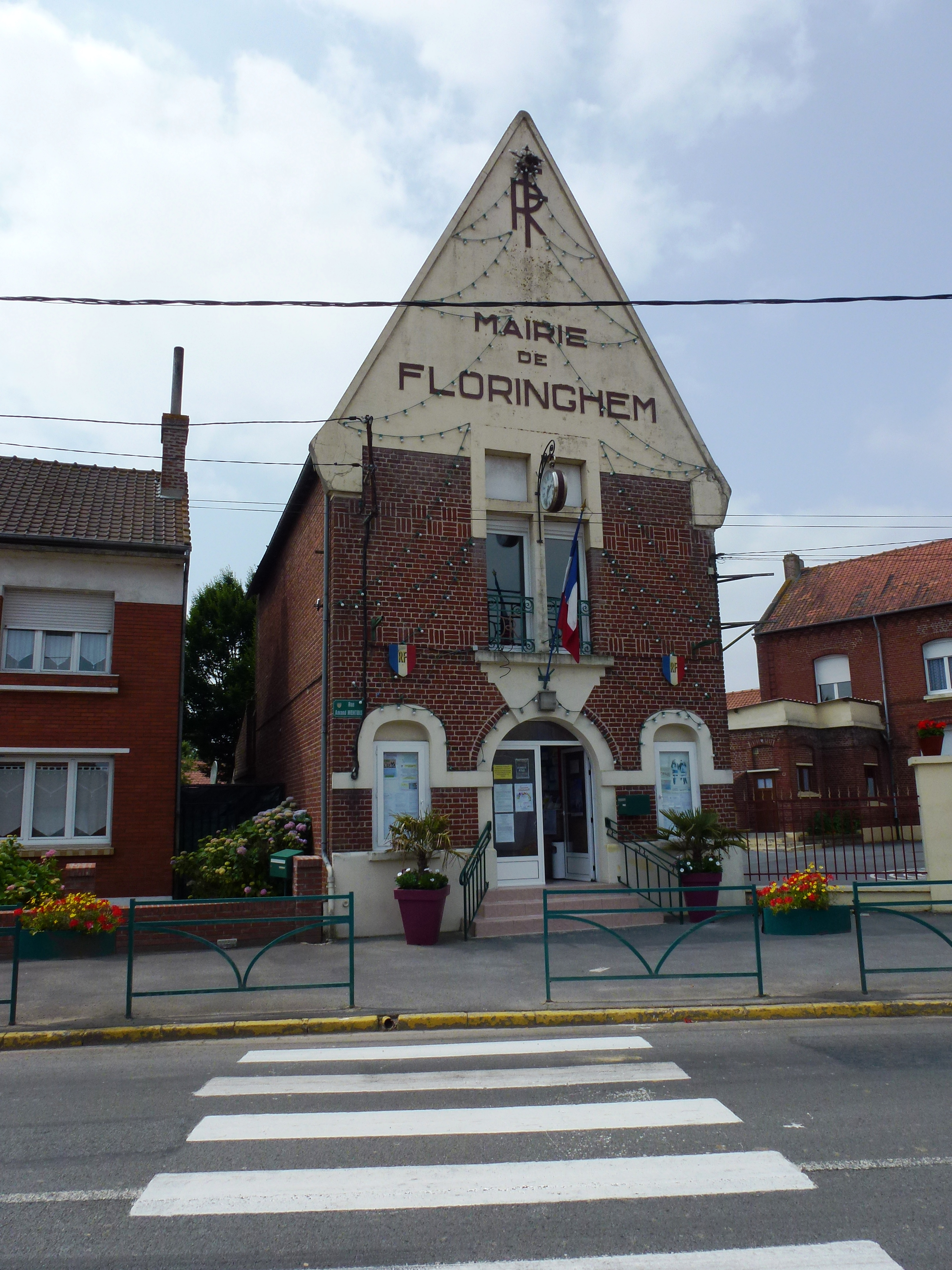
- The town hall of Floringhem

- Coat of arms
- Location of Floringhem
- Location within France Location within Hauts-de-France
- Coordinates: 50°29′48″N 2°25′38″E
- Country: France
- Region: Hauts-de-France
- Department: Pas-de-Calais
- Arrondissement: Arras
- Canton: Saint-Pol-sur-Ternoise
- Intercommunality: CC Ternois

Government
  - Mayor (2020–2026): Christophe Coppin
- Area^{1}: 4.65 km^{2} (1.80 sq mi)
- Elevation: 107 m (351 ft)
- Highest elevation: 140 m (460 ft)
- Lowest elevation: 66 m (217 ft)
- Population (2023): 877
  - Density: 189/km^{2} (488/sq mi)
- Time zone: UTC+01:00 (CET)
  - Summer (DST): UTC+02:00 (CEST)
- INSEE/Postal code: 62340 /62550
- ^{1} French Land Register data, which excludes lakes, ponds, glaciers > 1 km^{2} (0.386 sq mi or 247 acres) and river estuaries.

Floringhem (West Flemish: Florigem) is a commune in the Pas-de-Calais department in the Hauts-de-France region of France.

== Geography ==
A farming village situated 24 miles (39 km) northwest of Arras, at the junction of the D916 and D183 roads.

== Population ==
Historical population
Year	Pop.	±% p.a.
1968	792	—
1975	678	−2.20%
1982	681	+0.06%
1990	662	−0.35%
1999	675	+0.22%
2007	836	+2.71%
2012	868	+0.75%
2017	898	+0.68%
2023	877	−0.39%
Source: INSEE

== Places of interest ==
- The church of St.Pierre, dating from the sixteenth century.

== See also ==
- Communes of the Pas-de-Calais department
