= Pressy =

- Commune
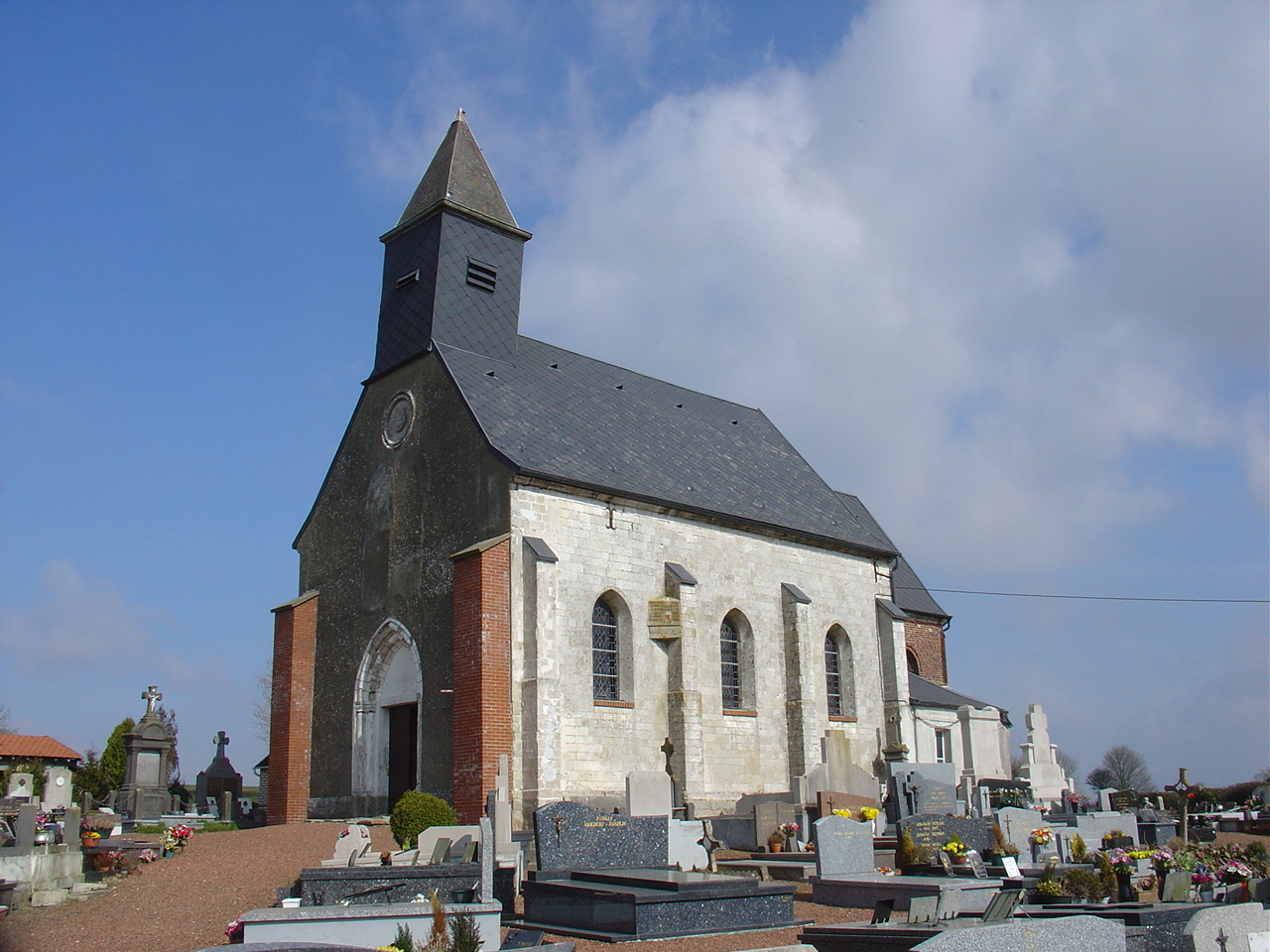
- The church of Pressy

- Coat of arms
- Location of Pressy
- Location within France Location within Hauts-de-France
- Coordinates: 50°28′32″N 2°23′49″E
- Country: France
- Region: Hauts-de-France
- Department: Pas-de-Calais
- Arrondissement: Arras
- Canton: Saint-Pol-sur-Ternoise
- Intercommunality: CC Ternois

Government
  - Mayor (2020–2026): Bernard Malle
- Area^{1}: 4.33 km^{2} (1.67 sq mi)
- Elevation: 107 m (351 ft)
- Highest elevation: 158 m (518 ft)
- Lowest elevation: 75 m (246 ft)
- Population (2023): 298
  - Density: 68.8/km^{2} (178/sq mi)
- Time zone: UTC+01:00 (CET)
  - Summer (DST): UTC+02:00 (CEST)
- INSEE/Postal code: 62669 /62550
- ^{1} French Land Register data, which excludes lakes, ponds, glaciers > 1 km^{2} (0.386 sq mi or 247 acres) and river estuaries.

Pressy (French pronunciation: [pʁesi]) is a commune in the Pas-de-Calais department in the Hauts-de-France region of France, a suburb of Pernes 27 miles (43 km) northwest of Arras.

== Population ==
Historical population
Year	Pop.	±% p.a.
1968	328	—
1975	317	−0.49%
1982	329	+0.53%
1990	313	−0.62%
1999	284	−1.07%
2007	279	−0.22%
2012	294	+1.05%
2017	317	+1.52%
2023	298	−1.02%
Source: INSEE

== See also ==
- Communes of the Pas-de-Calais department
