= Neuville-au-Cornet =

- Commune
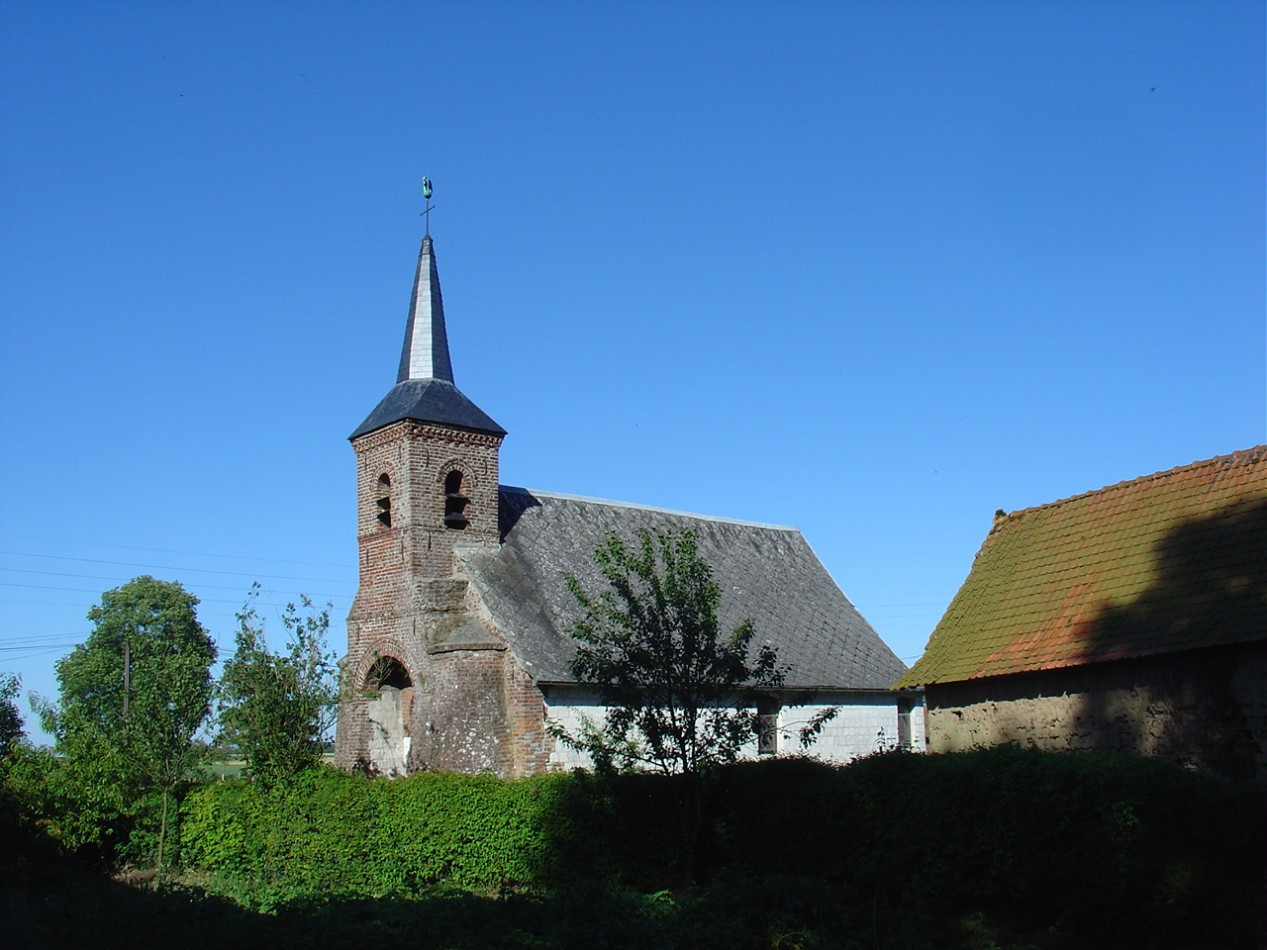
- The church of Neuville-au-Cornet

- Coat of arms
- Location of Neuville-au-Cornet
- Location within France Location within Hauts-de-France
- Coordinates: 50°20′12″N 2°22′08″E
- Country: France
- Region: Hauts-de-France
- Department: Pas-de-Calais
- Arrondissement: Arras
- Canton: Saint-Pol-sur-Ternoise
- Intercommunality: CC Ternois

Government
  - Mayor (2020–2026): Régis Marquet
- Area^{1}: 2.28 km^{2} (0.88 sq mi)
- Elevation: 146 m (479 ft)
- Highest elevation: 152 m (499 ft)
- Lowest elevation: 139 m (456 ft)
- Population (2023): 59
  - Density: 26/km^{2} (67/sq mi)
- Time zone: UTC+01:00 (CET)
  - Summer (DST): UTC+02:00 (CEST)
- INSEE/Postal code: 62607 /62170
- ^{1} French Land Register data, which excludes lakes, ponds, glaciers > 1 km^{2} (0.386 sq mi or 247 acres) and river estuaries.

Neuville-au-Cornet (French pronunciation: [nøvil o kɔʁnɛ]) is a commune in the Pas-de-Calais department in the Hauts-de-France region of France.

== Geography ==
Neuville-au-Cornet is situated 24 miles (39 km) west of Arras, at the junction of the D85 and D83 roads.

== Population ==
Historical population
Year	Pop.	±% p.a.
1968	65	—
1975	65	+0.00%
1982	65	+0.00%
1990	78	+2.31%
1999	66	−1.84%
2007	78	+2.11%
2012	87	+2.21%
2017	71	−3.98%
2023	59	−3.04%
Source: INSEE

== Places of interest ==
- The church of Notre-Dame, dating from the seventeenth century.
- The chapel of the virgin, also dating from the seventeenth century.

== See also ==
- Communes of the Pas-de-Calais department
