= Linzeux =

- Commune
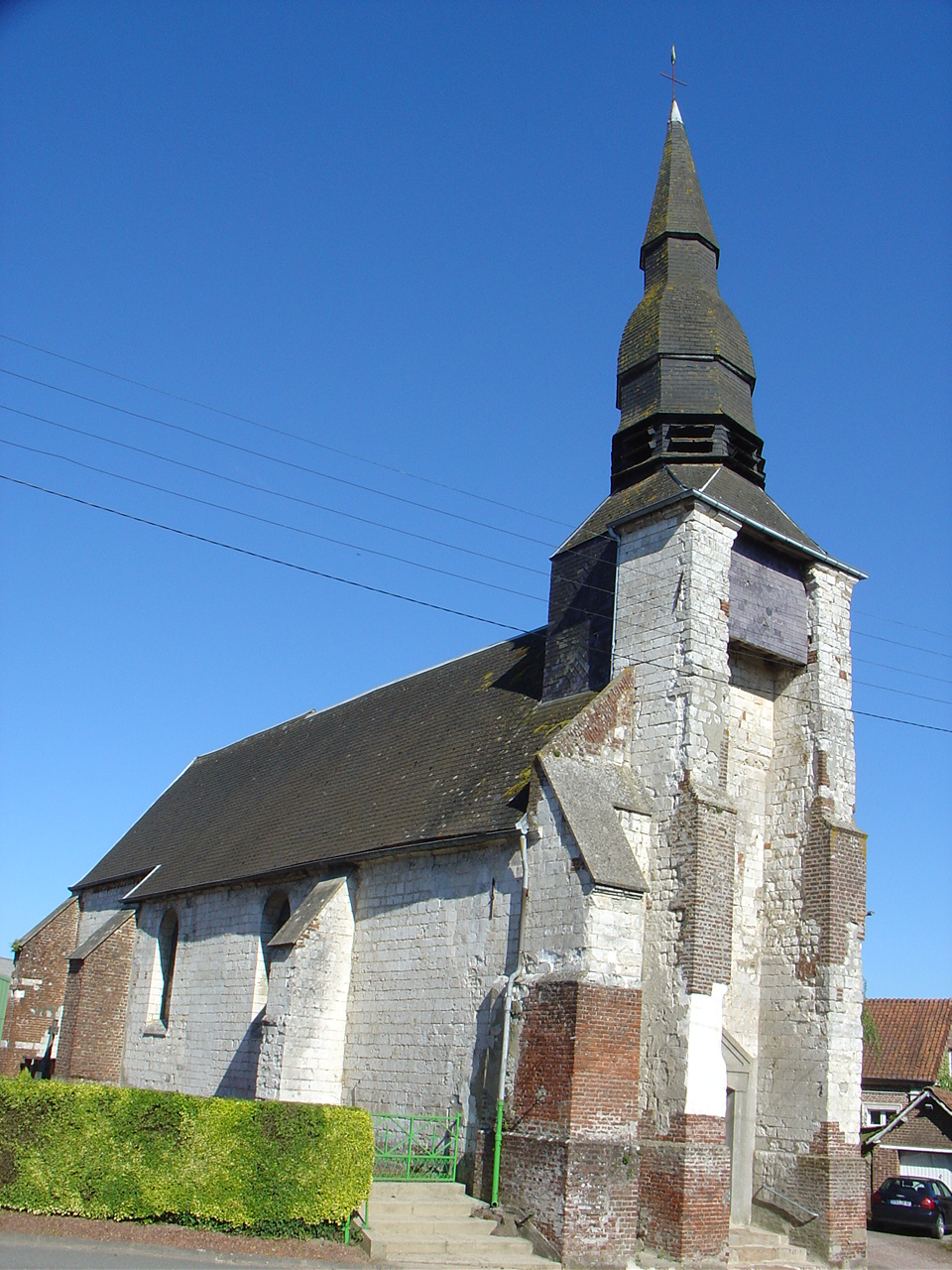
- The church of Linzeux

- Coat of arms
- Location of Linzeux
- Location within France Location within Hauts-de-France
- Coordinates: 50°20′32″N 2°12′20″E
- Country: France
- Region: Hauts-de-France
- Department: Pas-de-Calais
- Arrondissement: Arras
- Canton: Saint-Pol-sur-Ternoise
- Intercommunality: CC Ternois

Government
  - Mayor (2020–2026): Jean-Noël Fourdinier
- Area^{1}: 4.71 km^{2} (1.82 sq mi)
- Elevation: 100 m (330 ft)
- Highest elevation: 121 m (397 ft)
- Lowest elevation: 63 m (207 ft)
- Population (2023): 174
  - Density: 36.9/km^{2} (95.7/sq mi)
- Time zone: UTC+01:00 (CET)
  - Summer (DST): UTC+02:00 (CEST)
- INSEE/Postal code: 62518 /62270
- ^{1} French Land Register data, which excludes lakes, ponds, glaciers > 1 km^{2} (0.386 sq mi or 247 acres) and river estuaries.

Linzeux (French pronunciation: [lɛ̃zø]) is a commune in the Pas-de-Calais department in the Hauts-de-France region of France.

== Geography ==
Linzeux is situated 26 miles (42 km) west of Arras, at the junction of the D101 and the D109 roads.

== Population ==
Historical population
| Year | Pop. | ±% p.a. |
|---|---|---|
| 1968 | 193 | — |
| 1975 | 177 | −1.23% |
| 1982 | 157 | −1.70% |
| 1990 | 150 | −0.57% |
| 1999 | 148 | −0.15% |
| 2007 | 148 | +0.00% |
| 2012 | 170 | +2.81% |
| 2017 | 153 | −2.09% |
| 2023 | 174 | +2.17% |
Source: INSEE

== Places of interest ==
- The church of Notre-Dame, dating from the eighteenth century.

== See also ==
- Communes of the Pas-de-Calais department
