= Blangerval-Blangermont =

- Commune
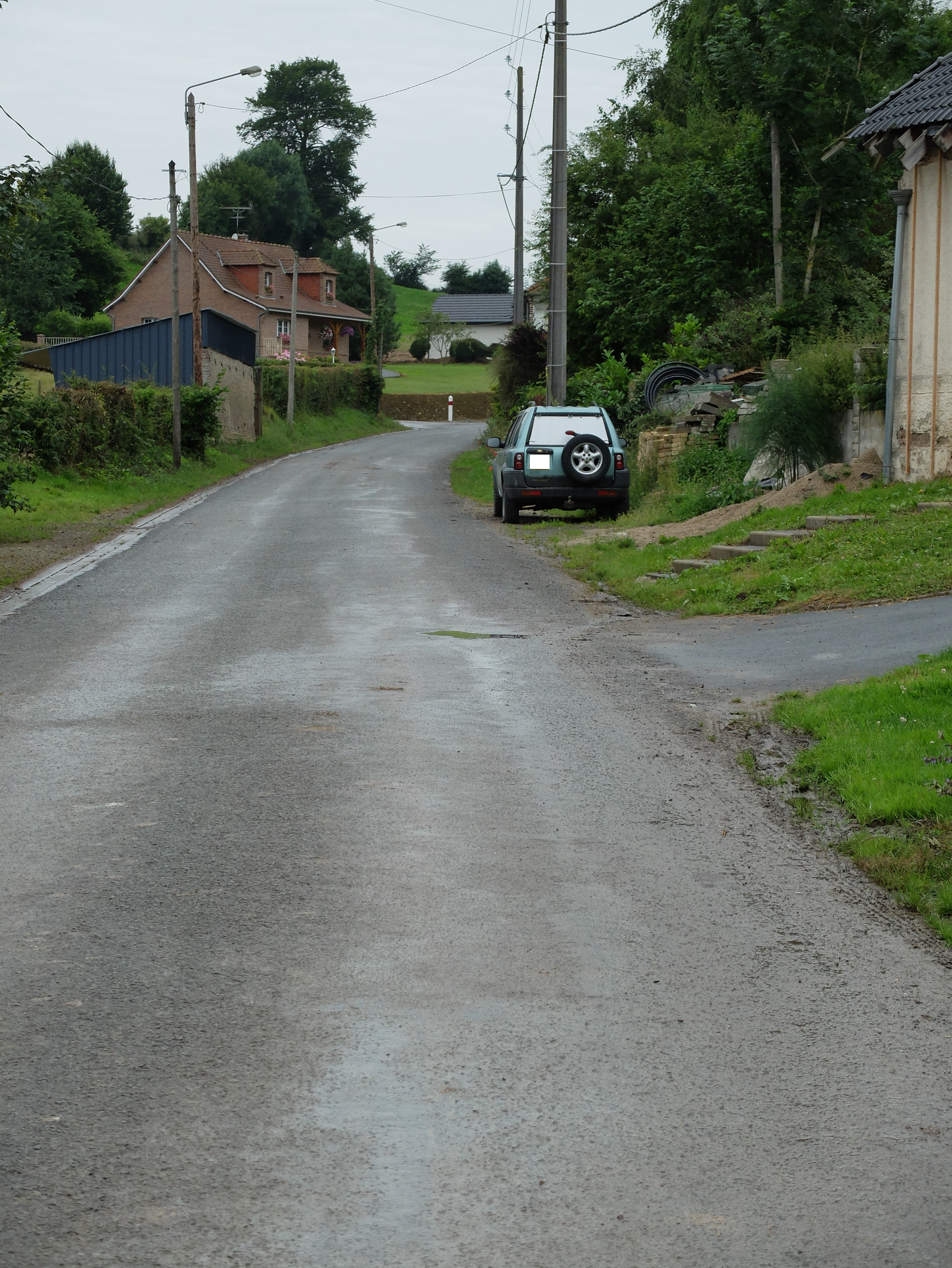
- The main road of Blangerval-Blangermont

- Coat of arms
- Location of Blangerval-Blangermont
- Location within France Location within Hauts-de-France
- Coordinates: 50°19′27″N 2°13′56″E
- Country: France
- Region: Hauts-de-France
- Department: Pas-de-Calais
- Arrondissement: Arras
- Canton: Saint-Pol-sur-Ternoise
- Intercommunality: CC du Ternois

Government
  - Mayor (2020–2026): Xavier Colin
- Area^{1}: 4.61 km^{2} (1.78 sq mi)
- Elevation: 95 m (312 ft)
- Highest elevation: 132 m (433 ft)
- Lowest elevation: 72 m (236 ft)
- Population (2023): 95
  - Density: 21/km^{2} (53/sq mi)
- Time zone: UTC+01:00 (CET)
  - Summer (DST): UTC+02:00 (CEST)
- INSEE/Postal code: 62137 /62270
- ^{1} French Land Register data, which excludes lakes, ponds, glaciers > 1 km^{2} (0.386 sq mi or 247 acres) and river estuaries.

Blangerval-Blangermont is a commune in the Pas-de-Calais department in the Hauts-de-France region in northern France.

== Geography ==
A farming village located 25 miles (40 km) west of Arras on the D109 road.

== Population ==
Historical population
Year	Pop.	±% p.a.
1968	154	—
1975	109	−4.82%
1982	107	−0.26%
1990	102	−0.60%
1999	85	−2.01%
2007	92	+0.99%
2012	103	+2.28%
2017	106	+0.58%
2023	95	−1.81%
Source: INSEE

== Sights ==
- The church of St. Pierre, dating from the twentieth century.
- The church of St. Jacques, dating from the eighteenth century.

== See also ==
- Communes of the Pas-de-Calais department
