= Guinecourt =

- Commune
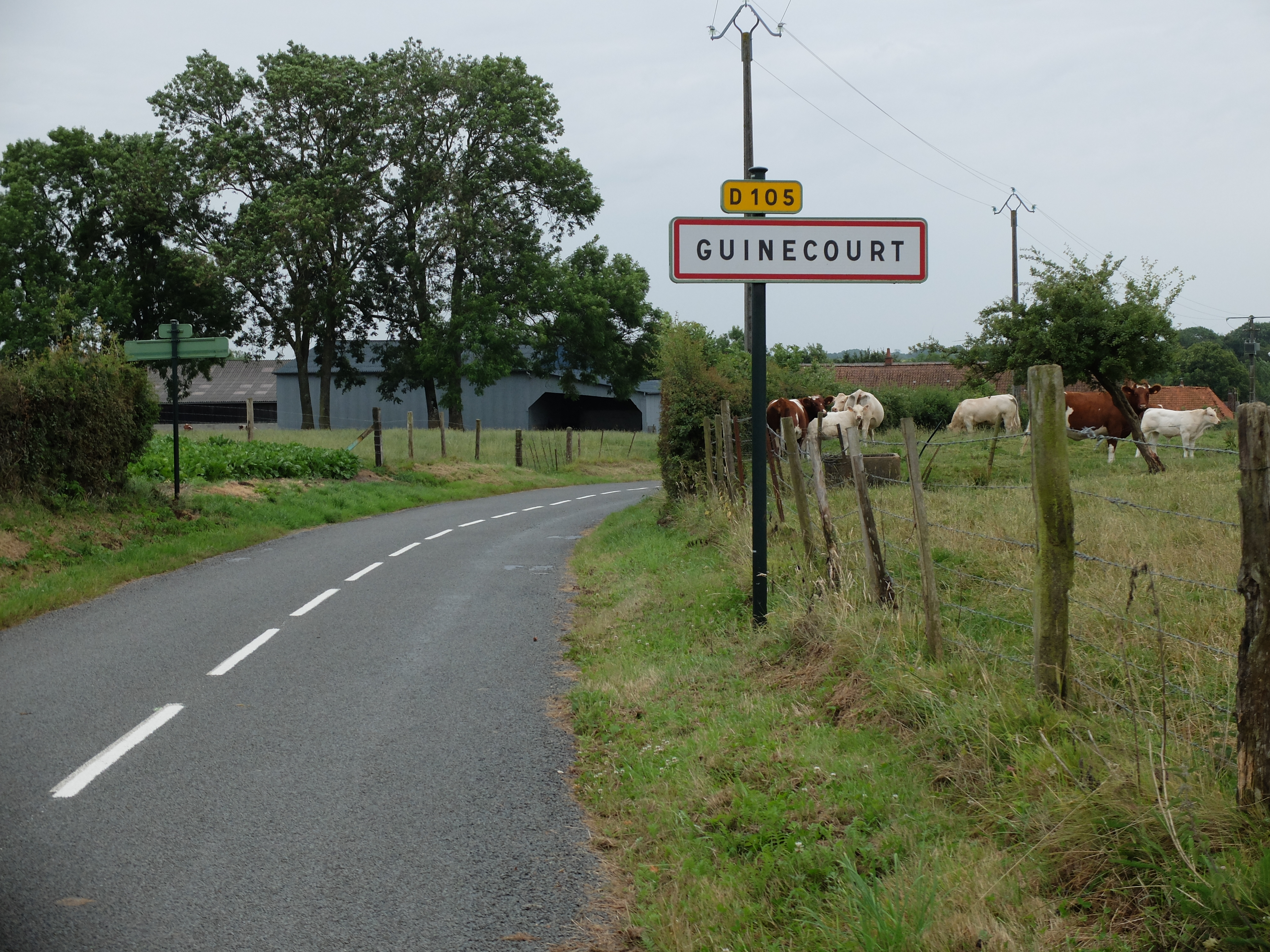
- The road into Guinecourt

- Coat of arms
- Location of Guinecourt
- Location within France Location within Hauts-de-France
- Coordinates: 50°20′59″N 2°13′36″E
- Country: France
- Region: Hauts-de-France
- Department: Pas-de-Calais
- Arrondissement: Arras
- Canton: Saint-Pol-sur-Ternoise
- Intercommunality: CC Ternois

Government
  - Mayor (2020–2026): Léon Vischery
- Area^{1}: 2.24 km^{2} (0.86 sq mi)
- Elevation: 112 m (367 ft)
- Highest elevation: 131 m (430 ft)
- Lowest elevation: 87 m (285 ft)
- Population (2023): 13
  - Density: 5.8/km^{2} (15/sq mi)
- Time zone: UTC+01:00 (CET)
  - Summer (DST): UTC+02:00 (CEST)
- INSEE/Postal code: 62396 /62130
- ^{1} French Land Register data, which excludes lakes, ponds, glaciers > 1 km^{2} (0.386 sq mi or 247 acres) and river estuaries.

Guinecourt (French pronunciation: [ɡinkuʁ]) is a commune in the Pas-de-Calais department in the Hauts-de-France region of France 28 miles (45 km) west of Arras.

== Population ==
Historical population
Year	Pop.	±% p.a.
1968	28	—
1975	27	−0.52%
1982	30	+1.52%
1990	24	−2.75%
1999	16	−4.41%
2007	19	+2.17%
2012	19	+0.00%
2017	17	−2.20%
2023	13	−4.37%
Source: INSEE

== See also ==
- Communes of the Pas-de-Calais department
