= Monts-en-Ternois =

- Commune
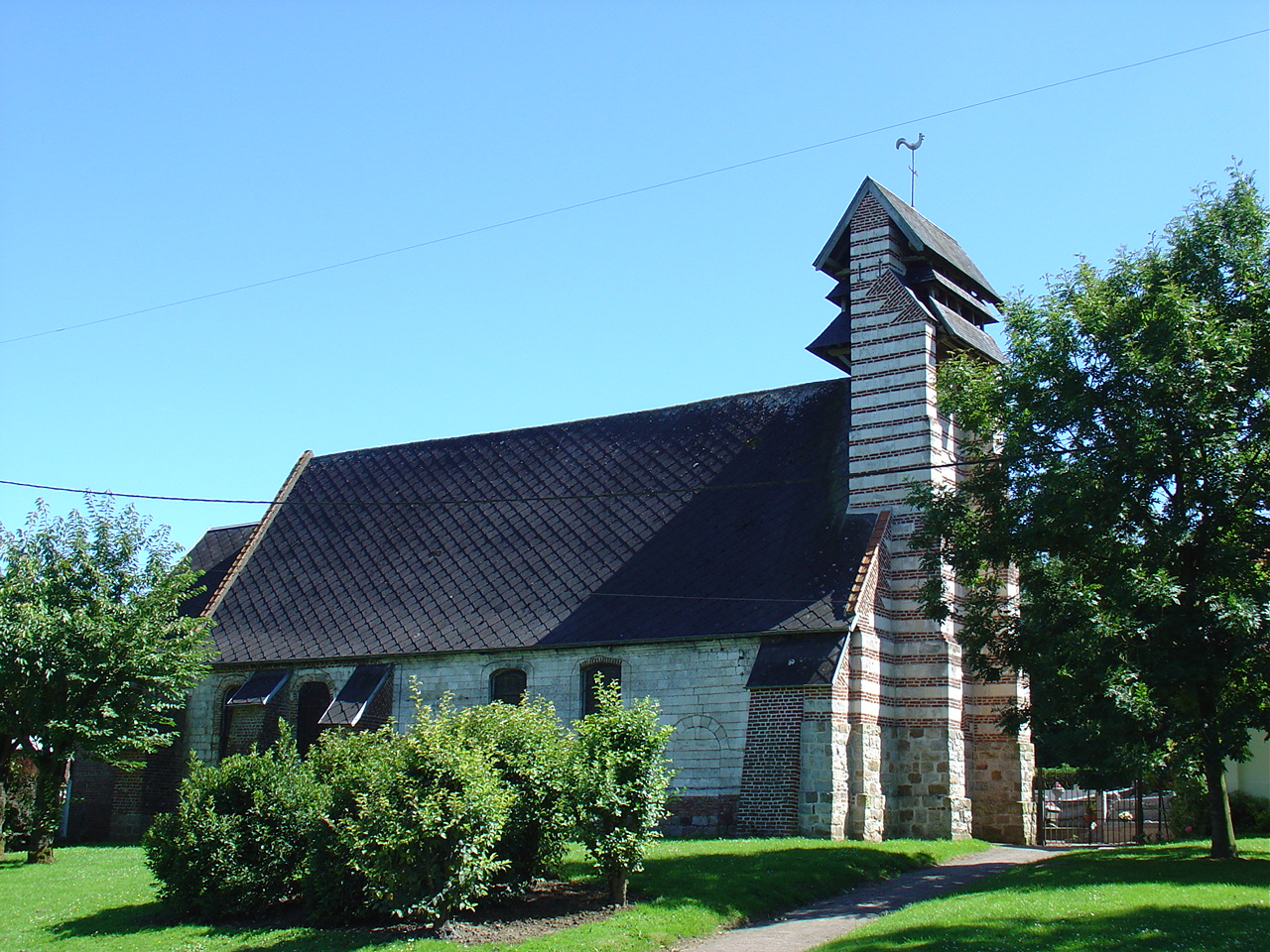
- The church of Monts-en-Ternois

- Coat of arms
- Location of Monts-en-Ternois
- Location within France Location within Hauts-de-France
- Coordinates: 50°19′20″N 2°23′11″E
- Country: France
- Region: Hauts-de-France
- Department: Pas-de-Calais
- Arrondissement: Arras
- Canton: Saint-Pol-sur-Ternoise
- Intercommunality: CC Ternois

Government
  - Mayor (2020–2026): François Deleau
- Area^{1}: 3.53 km^{2} (1.36 sq mi)
- Elevation: 135 m (443 ft)
- Highest elevation: 150 m (490 ft)
- Lowest elevation: 123 m (404 ft)
- Population (2023): 62
  - Density: 18/km^{2} (45/sq mi)
- Time zone: UTC+01:00 (CET)
  - Summer (DST): UTC+02:00 (CEST)
- INSEE/Postal code: 62590 /62130
- ^{1} French Land Register data, which excludes lakes, ponds, glaciers > 1 km^{2} (0.386 sq mi or 247 acres) and river estuaries.

Monts-en-Ternois is a commune in the Pas-de-Calais department in the Hauts-de-France region of France.

== Geography ==
Monts-en-Ternois is situated 20 miles (32 km) west of Arras, at the junction of the D23 and the D82 roads.

== Population ==
Historical population
Year	Pop.	±% p.a.
1968	117	—
1975	94	−3.08%
1982	80	−2.28%
1990	72	−1.31%
1999	70	−0.31%
2007	53	−3.42%
2012	56	+1.11%
2017	63	+2.38%
2023	62	−0.27%
Source: INSEE

== Places of interest ==
- The church of St. Adrien, dating from the sixteenth century.

== See also ==
- Communes of the Pas-de-Calais department
