= Boyaval =

- Commune
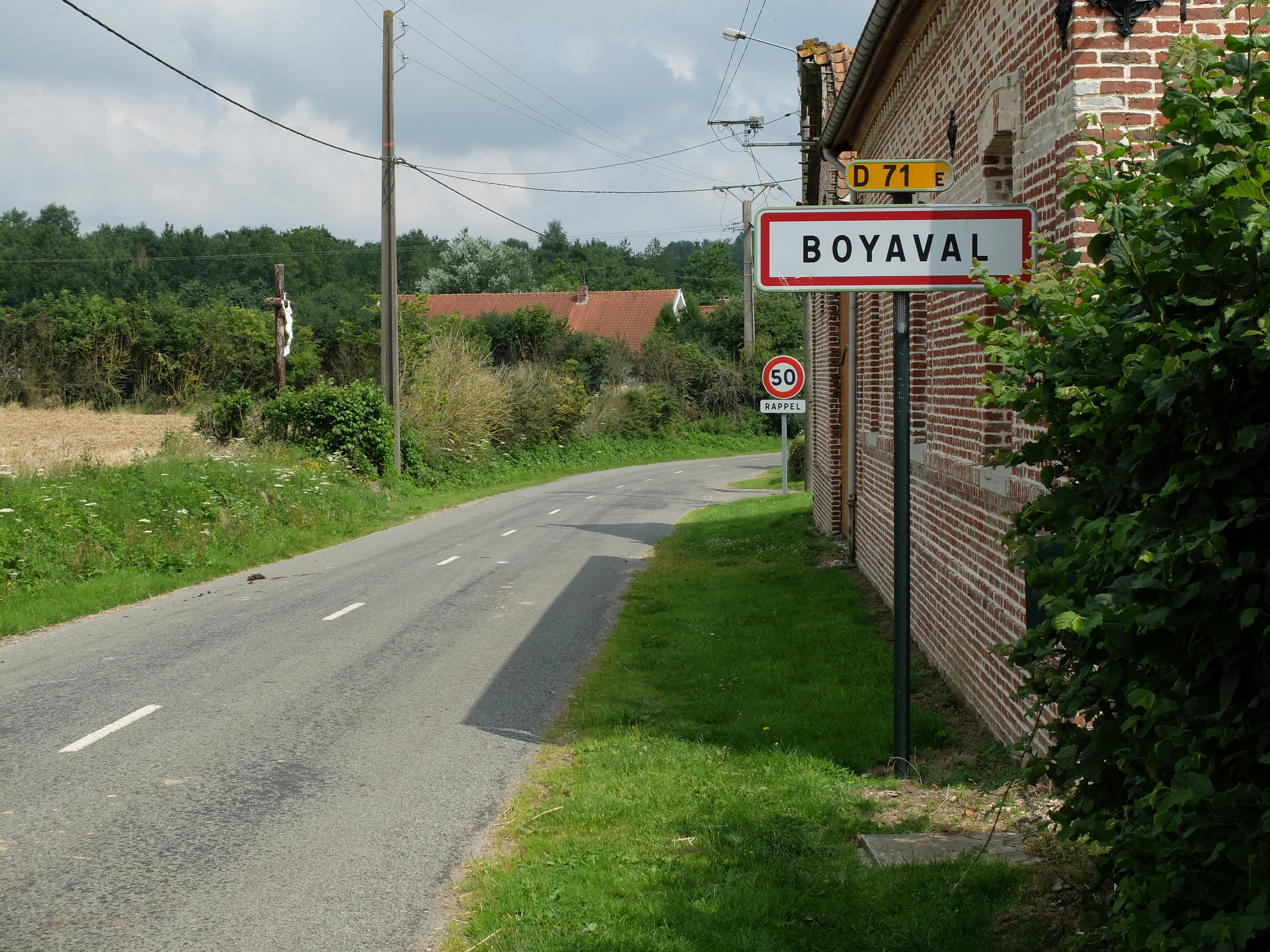
- The road into Boyaval

- Coat of arms
- Location of Boyaval
- Location within France Location within Hauts-de-France
- Coordinates: 50°28′30″N 2°18′18″E
- Country: France
- Region: Hauts-de-France
- Department: Pas-de-Calais
- Arrondissement: Arras
- Canton: Saint-Pol-sur-Ternoise
- Intercommunality: CC Ternois

Government
  - Mayor (2020–2026): Marc Vambergue
- Area^{1}: 5.38 km^{2} (2.08 sq mi)
- Elevation: 105 m (344 ft)
- Highest elevation: 172 m (564 ft)
- Lowest elevation: 80 m (260 ft)
- Population (2023): 147
  - Density: 27.3/km^{2} (70.8/sq mi)
- Time zone: UTC+01:00 (CET)
  - Summer (DST): UTC+02:00 (CEST)
- INSEE/Postal code: 62171 /62134
- ^{1} French Land Register data, which excludes lakes, ponds, glaciers > 1 km^{2} (0.386 sq mi or 247 acres) and river estuaries.

Boyaval is a commune in the Pas-de-Calais department in the Hauts-de-France region in northern France.

== Geography ==
A farming village located 25 miles (40 km) northwest of Arras on the D71 road.

== Population ==
Historical population
Year	Pop.	±% p.a.
1968	152	—
1975	135	−1.68%
1982	124	−1.21%
1990	110	−1.49%
1999	118	+0.78%
2007	130	+1.22%
2012	134	+0.61%
2017	133	−0.15%
2023	147	+1.68%
Source: INSEE

== Sights ==
- The church of St. André, dating from the twentieth century.
- The chateau, dating from the eighteenth century.

== See also ==
- Communes of the Pas-de-Calais department
