= Équirre =

- Commune
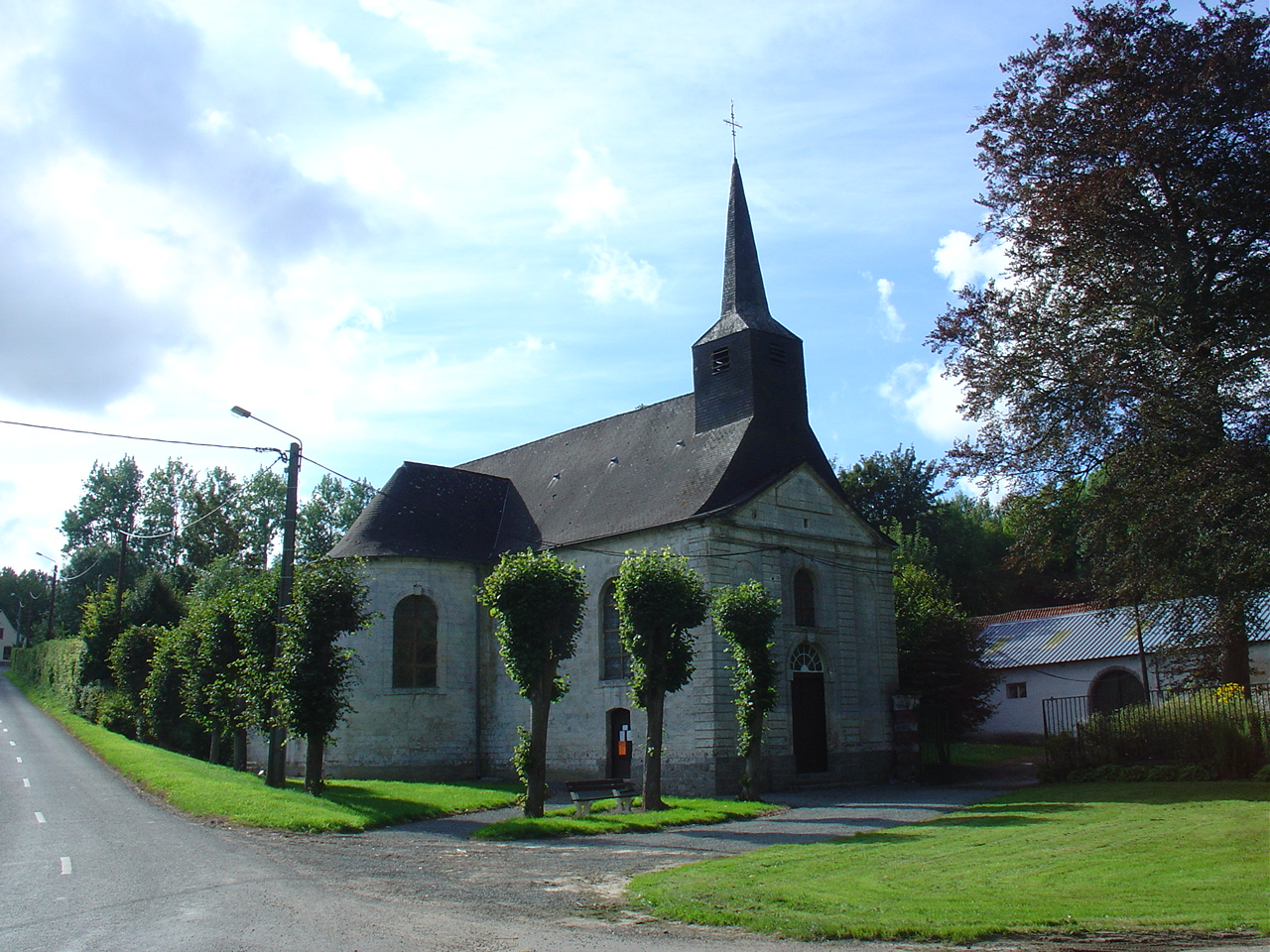
- The church of Équirre

- Coat of arms
- Location of Équirre
- Location within France Location within Hauts-de-France
- Coordinates: 50°28′24″N 2°14′15″E
- Country: France
- Region: Hauts-de-France
- Department: Pas-de-Calais
- Arrondissement: Arras
- Canton: Saint-Pol-sur-Ternoise
- Intercommunality: CC Ternois

Government
  - Mayor (2020–2026): Marcel Prin
- Area^{1}: 4.19 km^{2} (1.62 sq mi)
- Elevation: 104 m (341 ft)
- Highest elevation: 155 m (509 ft)
- Lowest elevation: 79 m (259 ft)
- Population (2023): 71
  - Density: 17/km^{2} (44/sq mi)
- Time zone: UTC+01:00 (CET)
  - Summer (DST): UTC+02:00 (CEST)
- INSEE/Postal code: 62301 /62134
- ^{1} French Land Register data, which excludes lakes, ponds, glaciers > 1 km^{2} (0.386 sq mi or 247 acres) and river estuaries.

Équirre (French pronunciation: [ekiʁ]) is a commune in the Pas-de-Calais department in the Hauts-de-France region of France 48 km (30 miles) northwest of Arras.

== Population ==
Historical population
Year	Pop.	±% p.a.
1968	124	—
1975	100	−3.03%
1982	81	−2.97%
1990	77	−0.63%
1999	71	−0.90%
2007	57	−2.71%
2012	60	+1.03%
2017	76	+4.84%
2023	71	−1.13%
Source: INSEE

== See also ==
- Communes of the Pas-de-Calais department
