= Marest =

- Commune
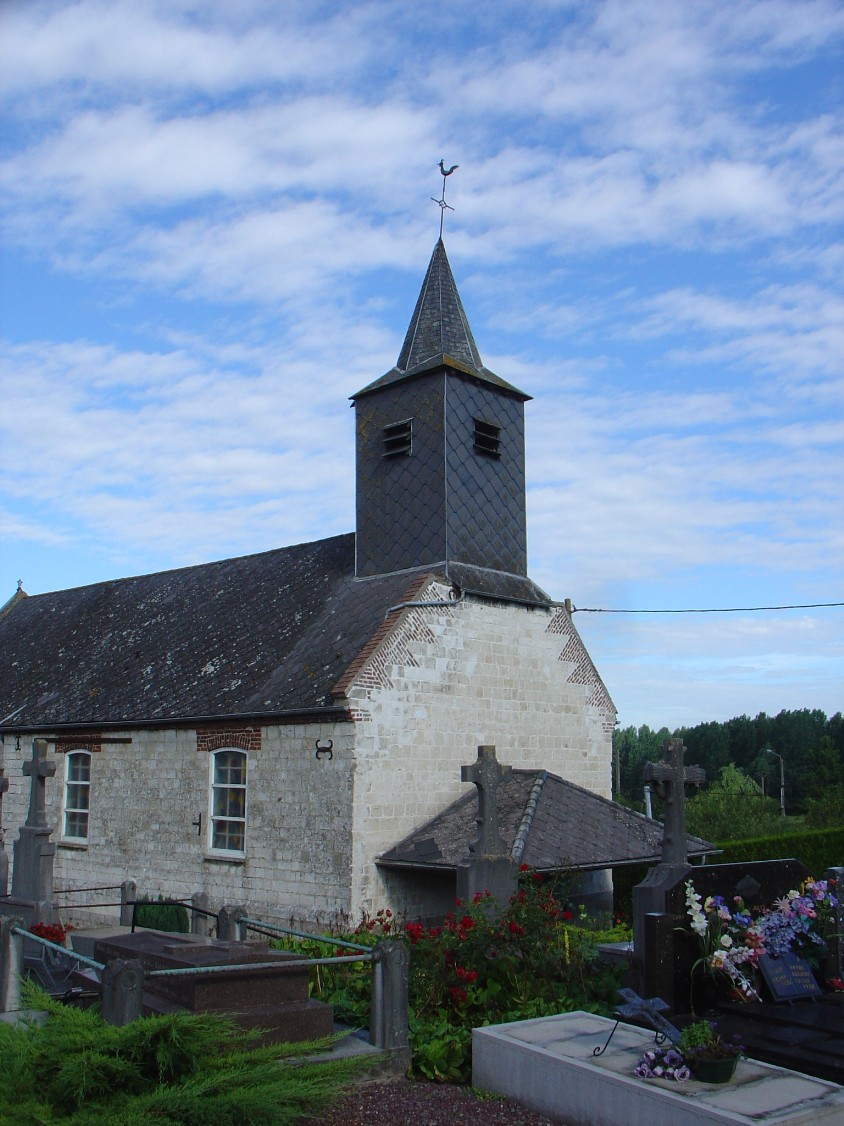
- The church of Marest

- Coat of arms
- Location of Marest
- Location within France Location within Hauts-de-France
- Coordinates: 50°28′05″N 2°24′56″E
- Country: France
- Region: Hauts-de-France
- Department: Pas-de-Calais
- Arrondissement: Arras
- Canton: Saint-Pol-sur-Ternoise
- Intercommunality: CC Ternois

Government
  - Mayor (2020–2026): Bernard Helleboid
- Area^{1}: 3.16 km^{2} (1.22 sq mi)
- Elevation: 95 m (312 ft)
- Highest elevation: 178 m (584 ft)
- Lowest elevation: 75 m (246 ft)
- Population (2023): 279
  - Density: 88.3/km^{2} (229/sq mi)
- Time zone: UTC+01:00 (CET)
  - Summer (DST): UTC+02:00 (CEST)
- INSEE/Postal code: 62553 /62550
- ^{1} French Land Register data, which excludes lakes, ponds, glaciers > 1 km^{2} (0.386 sq mi or 247 acres) and river estuaries.

Marest is a commune in the Pas-de-Calais department in the Hauts-de-France region of France.

== Geography ==
Marest is situated 25 miles (40 km) northwest of Arras, at the junction of the D89 and the D916 roads.

== Population ==
Historical population
Year	Pop.	±% p.a.
1968	228	—
1975	215	−0.84%
1982	242	+1.70%
1990	240	−0.10%
1999	242	+0.09%
2007	263	+1.05%
2012	279	+1.19%
2017	285	+0.43%
2023	279	−0.35%
Source: INSEE

== Places of interest ==
- The church of St.Vaast, dating from the seventeenth century.
- An eighteenth-century windmill.

== See also ==
- Communes of the Pas-de-Calais department
