= Foufflin-Ricametz =

- Commune
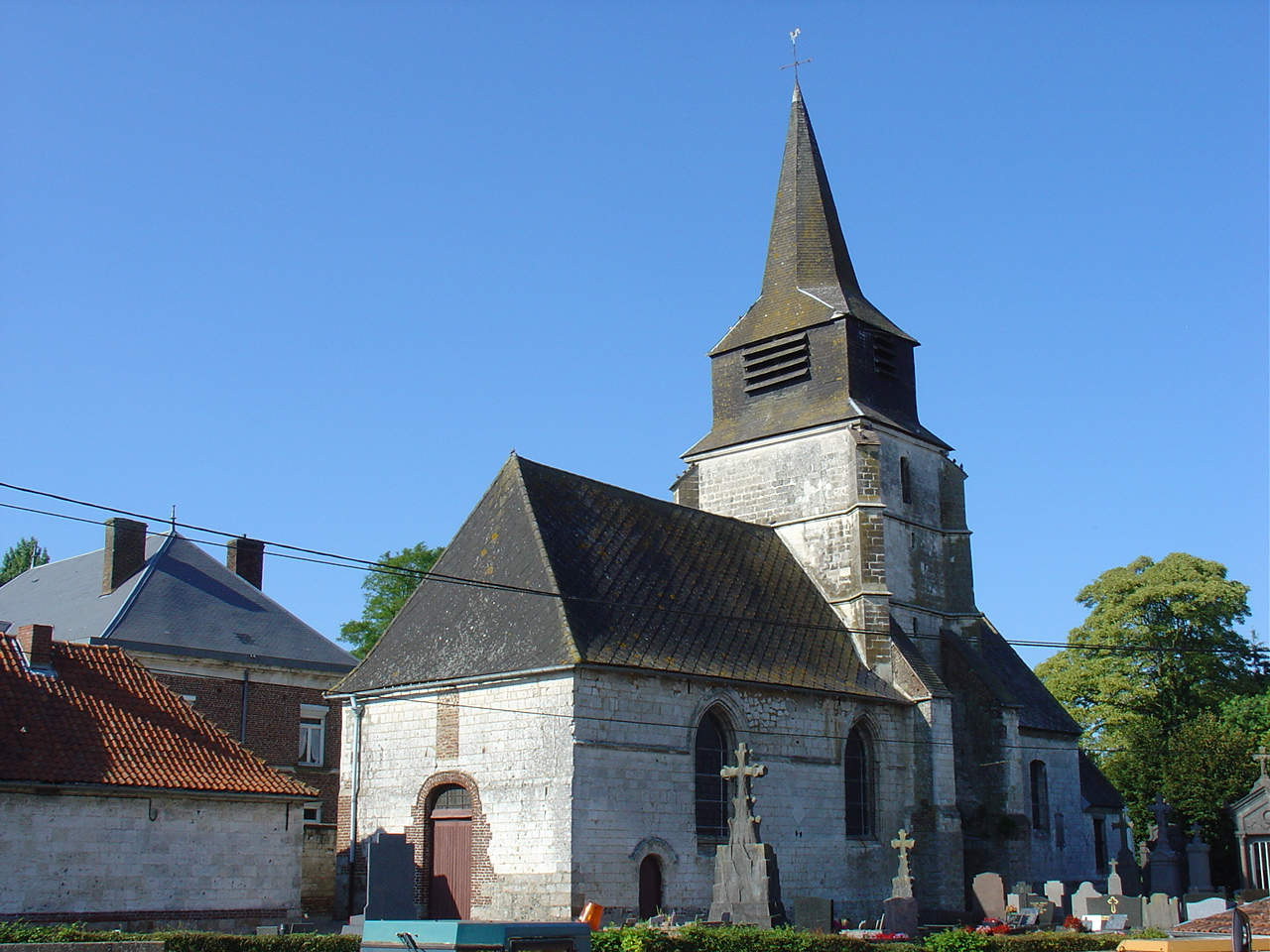
- The church of Foufflin-Ricametz

- Coat of arms
- Location of Foufflin-Ricametz
- Location within France Location within Hauts-de-France
- Coordinates: 50°21′00″N 2°23′11″E
- Country: France
- Region: Hauts-de-France
- Department: Pas-de-Calais
- Arrondissement: Arras
- Canton: Saint-Pol-sur-Ternoise
- Intercommunality: CC Ternois

Government
  - Mayor (2020–2026): Philippe De Plasse
- Area^{1}: 3 km^{2} (1.2 sq mi)
- Elevation: 145 m (476 ft)
- Highest elevation: 156 m (512 ft)
- Lowest elevation: 123 m (404 ft)
- Population (2023): 148
  - Density: 49/km^{2} (130/sq mi)
- Time zone: UTC+01:00 (CET)
  - Summer (DST): UTC+02:00 (CEST)
- INSEE/Postal code: 62348 /62130
- ^{1} French Land Register data, which excludes lakes, ponds, glaciers > 1 km^{2} (0.386 sq mi or 247 acres) and river estuaries.

Foufflin-Ricametz is a commune in the Pas-de-Calais department in the Hauts-de-France region of France 22 miles (35 km) northwest of Arras.

== Population ==
Historical population
Year	Pop.	±% p.a.
1968	182	—
1975	144	−3.29%
1982	133	−1.13%
1990	128	−0.48%
1999	135	+0.59%
2007	121	−1.36%
2012	120	−0.17%
2017	160	+5.92%
2023	148	−1.29%
Source: INSEE

== See also ==
- Communes of the Pas-de-Calais department
