= Aumerval =

- Commune
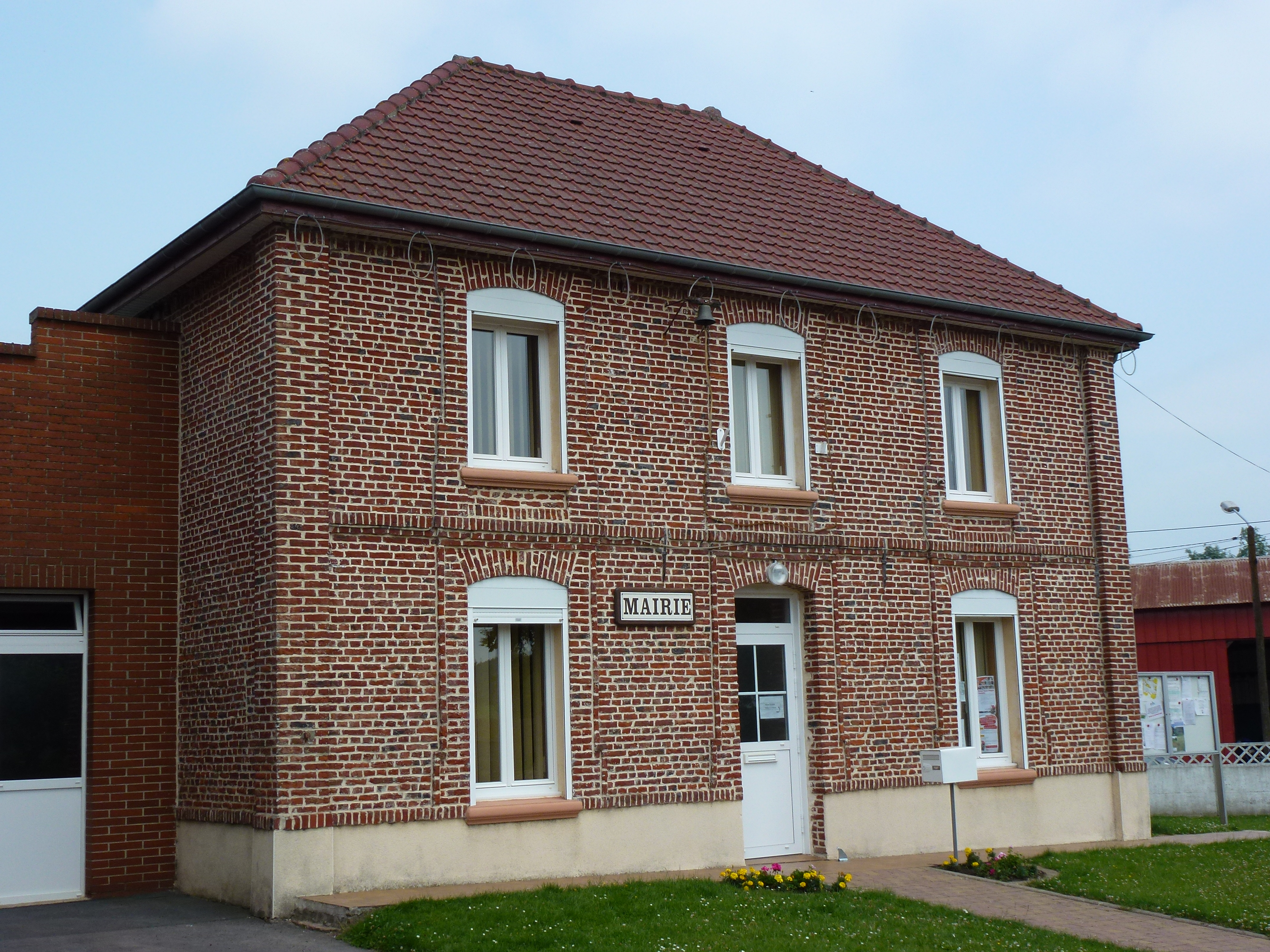
- The town hall of Aumerval

- Coat of arms
- Location of Aumerval
- Location within France Location within Hauts-de-France
- Coordinates: 50°30′25″N 2°24′05″E
- Country: France
- Region: Hauts-de-France
- Department: Pas-de-Calais
- Arrondissement: Arras
- Canton: Saint-Pol-sur-Ternoise
- Intercommunality: CC du Ternois

Government
  - Mayor (2022–2026): François Couvreur
- Area^{1}: 3.42 km^{2} (1.32 sq mi)
- Elevation: 132 m (433 ft)
- Highest elevation: 180 m (590 ft)
- Lowest elevation: 98 m (322 ft)
- Population (2023): 189
  - Density: 55.3/km^{2} (143/sq mi)
- Time zone: UTC+01:00 (CET)
  - Summer (DST): UTC+02:00 (CEST)
- INSEE/Postal code: 62058 /62550
- ^{1} French Land Register data, which excludes lakes, ponds, glaciers > 1 km^{2} (0.386 sq mi or 247 acres) and river estuaries.

Aumerval (French pronunciation: [omɛʁval]) is a commune in the Pas-de-Calais department in northern France.

== Geography ==
A village located 25 miles (40 km) northwest of Arras at the junction of the D90 and D91 roads.

== Population ==
Historical population
Year	Pop.	±% p.a.
1968	224	—
1975	212	−0.78%
1982	190	−1.55%
1990	173	−1.16%
1999	191	+1.11%
2007	191	+0.00%
2012	199	+0.82%
2017	198	−0.10%
2023	189	−0.77%
Source: INSEE

== Sights ==
- The church of St. Maur, dating from the seventeenth century.
- An eighteenth-century chapel.

== See also ==
- Communes of the Pas-de-Calais department
