= Croisette, Pas-de-Calais =

Croisette
- Commune
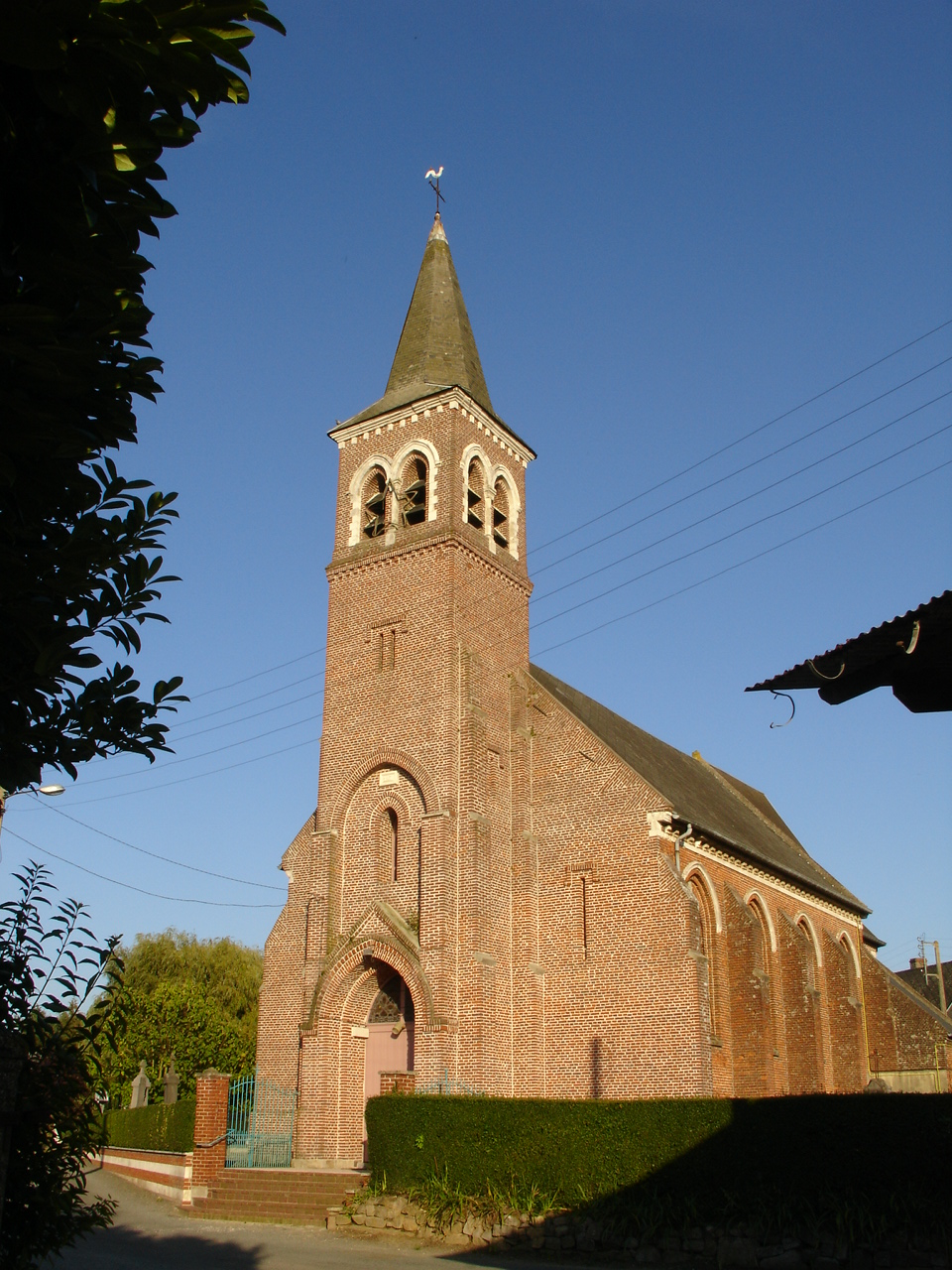
- The church of Croisette

- Coat of arms
- Location of Croisette
- Location within France Location within Hauts-de-France
- Coordinates: 50°21′15″N 2°15′42″E
- Country: France
- Region: Hauts-de-France
- Department: Pas-de-Calais
- Arrondissement: Arras
- Canton: Saint-Pol-sur-Ternoise
- Intercommunality: CC Ternois

Government
  - Mayor (2020–2026): Claude Bâchelet
- Area^{1}: 7.64 km^{2} (2.95 sq mi)
- Elevation: 141 m (463 ft)
- Highest elevation: 146 m (479 ft)
- Lowest elevation: 114 m (374 ft)
- Population (2023): 318
  - Density: 41.6/km^{2} (108/sq mi)
- Time zone: UTC+01:00 (CET)
  - Summer (DST): UTC+02:00 (CEST)
- INSEE/Postal code: 62258 /62130
- ^{1} French Land Register data, which excludes lakes, ponds, glaciers > 1 km^{2} (0.386 sq mi or 247 acres) and river estuaries.

Croisette (French pronunciation: [kʁwazɛt]) is a commune in the Pas-de-Calais department in the Hauts-de-France region of France.

== Geography ==
Croisette is located 24 miles (37 km) west of Arras at the junction of the D101 and D104 roads.

== Population ==
The inhabitants are called Croisettois in French.

Historical population
Year	Pop.	±% p.a.
1968	287	—
1975	297	+0.49%
1982	325	+1.30%
1990	302	−0.91%
1999	308	+0.22%
2007	308	+0.00%
2012	317	+0.58%
2017	278	−2.59%
2023	318	+2.27%
Source: INSEE

== Places of interest ==
- The church of St. Martin, dating from the seventeenth century
- The single Commonwealth War Graves Commission grave and monument
- Remains of a fortified house
- Two chapels

== See also ==
- Communes of the Pas-de-Calais department
