= Huclier =

- Commune
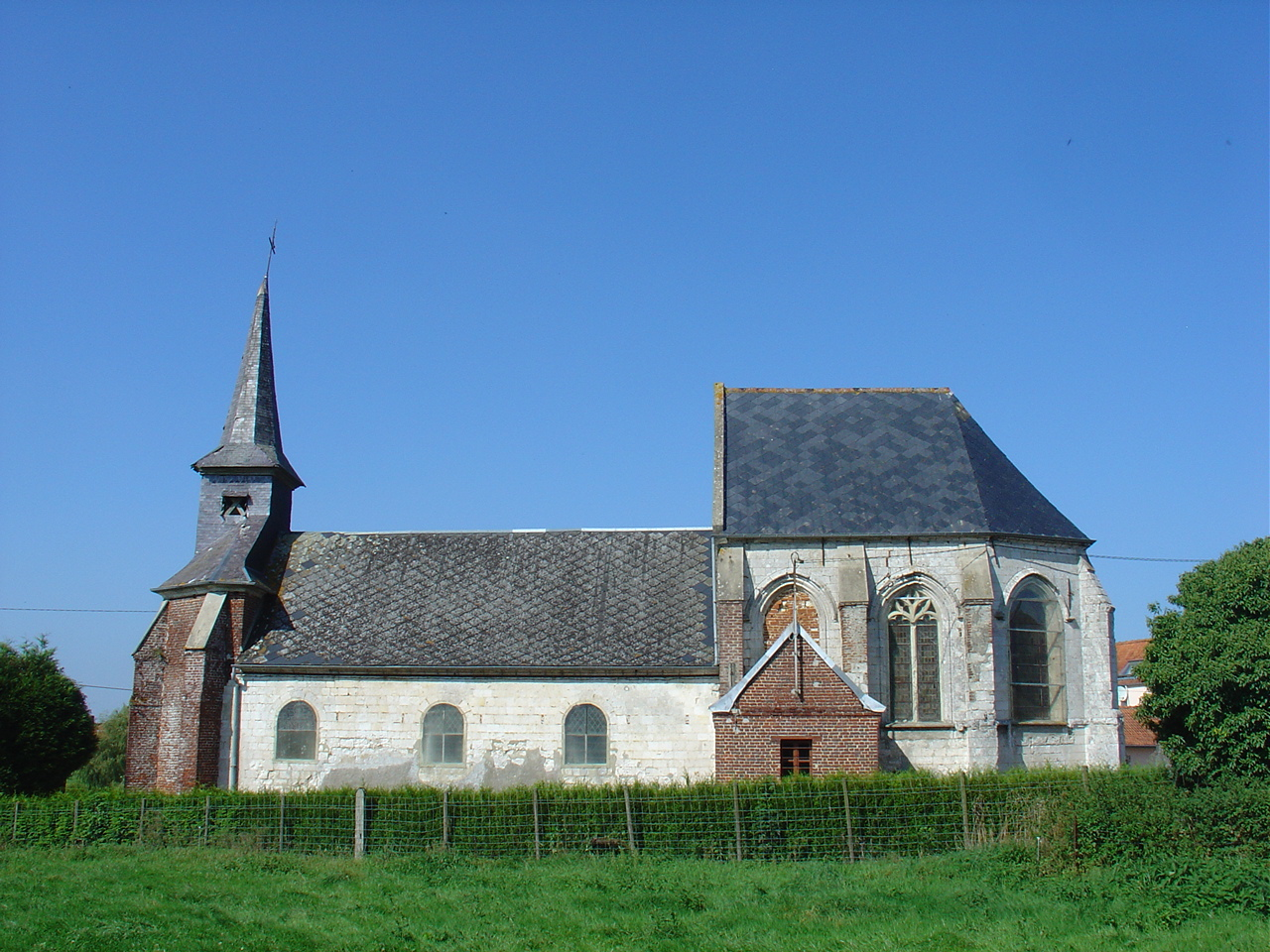
- The church of Huclier

- Coat of arms
- Location of Huclier
- Location within France Location within Hauts-de-France
- Coordinates: 50°25′48″N 2°21′14″E
- Country: France
- Region: Hauts-de-France
- Department: Pas-de-Calais
- Arrondissement: Arras
- Canton: Saint-Pol-sur-Ternoise
- Intercommunality: CC Ternois

Government
  - Mayor (2020–2026): Patrick Galiot
- Area^{1}: 3.32 km^{2} (1.28 sq mi)
- Highest elevation: 163 m (535 ft)
- Lowest elevation: 122 m (400 ft)
- Population (2023): 152
  - Density: 45.8/km^{2} (119/sq mi)
- Time zone: UTC+01:00 (CET)
  - Summer (DST): UTC+02:00 (CEST)
- INSEE/Postal code: 62462 /62130
- ^{1} French Land Register data, which excludes lakes, ponds, glaciers > 1 km^{2} (0.386 sq mi or 247 acres) and river estuaries.

Huclier (French pronunciation: [yklije]) is a commune in the Pas-de-Calais department in the Hauts-de-France region of France.

== Geography ==
A small farming village situated 20 miles (32 km) northwest of Arras, at the junction of the D88 and the D86 roads.

== Population ==
Historical population
| Year | Pop. | ±% p.a. |
|---|---|---|
| 1968 | 79 | — |
| 1975 | 71 | −1.51% |
| 1982 | 59 | −2.61% |
| 1990 | 76 | +3.22% |
| 1999 | 77 | +0.15% |
| 2007 | 113 | +4.91% |
| 2012 | 120 | +1.21% |
| 2017 | 137 | +2.69% |
| 2023 | 152 | +1.75% |
Source: INSEE

== Places of interest ==
- The church of Notre-Dame, dating from the sixteenth century.
- The chapel of Notre-Dame
- A seventeenth century farmhouse

== See also ==
- Communes of the Pas-de-Calais department
