= Moncheaux-lès-Frévent =

- Commune
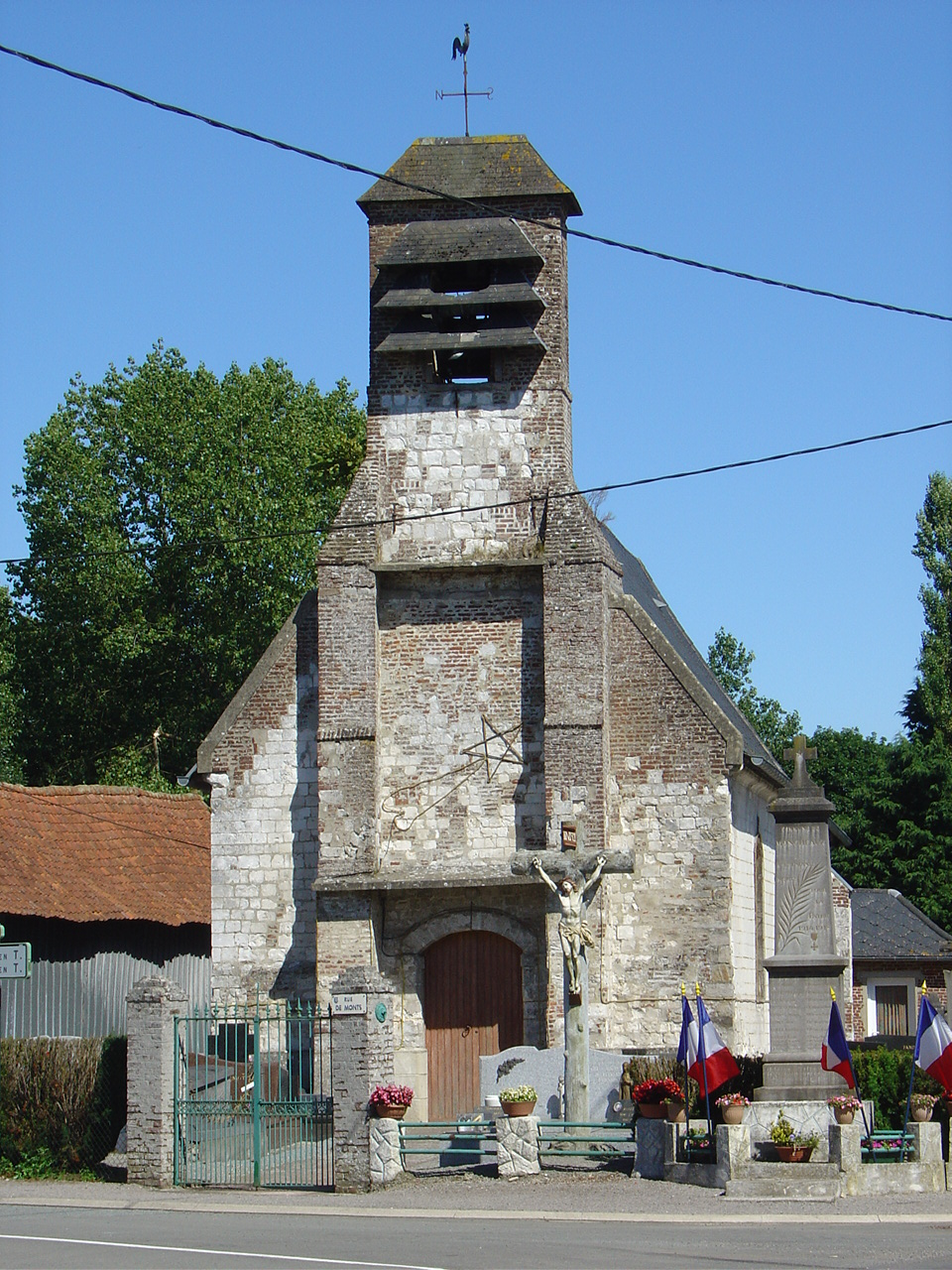
- The church of Moncheaux-lès-Frévent

- Coat of arms
- Location of Moncheaux-lès-Frévent
- Location within France Location within Hauts-de-France
- Coordinates: 50°18′54″N 2°22′02″E
- Country: France
- Region: Hauts-de-France
- Department: Pas-de-Calais
- Arrondissement: Arras
- Canton: Saint-Pol-sur-Ternoise
- Intercommunality: CC Ternois

Government
  - Mayor (2020–2026): Julie Hertault
- Area^{1}: 3.92 km^{2} (1.51 sq mi)
- Elevation: 137 m (449 ft)
- Highest elevation: 153 m (502 ft)
- Lowest elevation: 128 m (420 ft)
- Population (2023): 133
  - Density: 33.9/km^{2} (87.9/sq mi)
- Time zone: UTC+01:00 (CET)
  - Summer (DST): UTC+02:00 (CEST)
- INSEE/Postal code: 62576 /62270
- ^{1} French Land Register data, which excludes lakes, ponds, glaciers > 1 km^{2} (0.386 sq mi or 247 acres) and river estuaries.

Moncheaux-lès-Frévent (French pronunciation: [mɔ̃ʃo lɛ fʁevɑ̃], literally Moncheaux near Frévent) is a commune in the Pas-de-Calais department in the Hauts-de-France region of France 20 miles (32 km) west of Arras.

== Population ==
Historical population
Year	Pop.	±% p.a.
1968	155	—
1975	138	−1.65%
1982	107	−3.57%
1990	109	+0.23%
1999	112	+0.30%
2007	136	+2.46%
2012	118	−2.80%
2017	139	+3.33%
2023	133	−0.73%
Source: INSEE

== See also ==
- Communes of the Pas-de-Calais department
