= Nédon =

- Commune
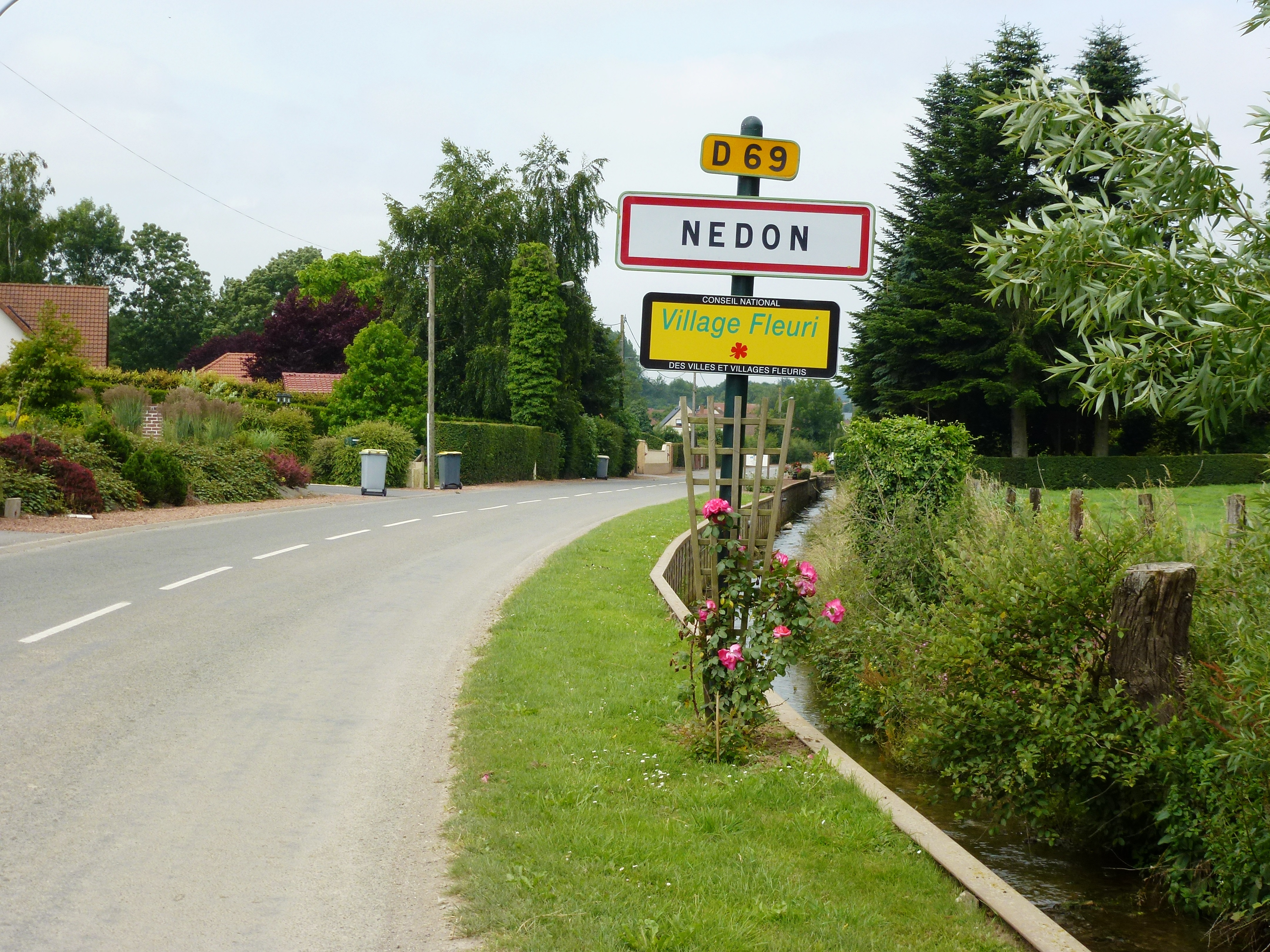
- The road into Nédon

- Coat of arms
- Location of Nédon
- Location within France Location within Hauts-de-France
- Coordinates: 50°31′34″N 2°22′14″E
- Country: France
- Region: Hauts-de-France
- Department: Pas-de-Calais
- Arrondissement: Arras
- Canton: Saint-Pol-sur-Ternoise
- Intercommunality: CC Ternois

Government
  - Mayor (2020–2026): Angelique Tavernier
- Area^{1}: 4.89 km^{2} (1.89 sq mi)
- Elevation: 105 m (344 ft)
- Highest elevation: 187 m (614 ft)
- Lowest elevation: 85 m (279 ft)
- Population (2023): 158
  - Density: 32.3/km^{2} (83.7/sq mi)
- Time zone: UTC+01:00 (CET)
  - Summer (DST): UTC+02:00 (CEST)
- INSEE/Postal code: 62600 /62550
- ^{1} French Land Register data, which excludes lakes, ponds, glaciers > 1 km^{2} (0.386 sq mi or 247 acres) and river estuaries.

Nédon (French pronunciation: [nedɔ̃]) is a commune in the Pas-de-Calais department in the Hauts-de-France region of France

== Geography ==
Nédon is situated 28 miles (45 km) northwest of Arras, in the valley of the river Nave.

== Population ==
Historical population
Year	Pop.	±% p.a.
1968	174	—
1975	159	−1.28%
1982	186	+2.27%
1990	152	−2.49%
1999	140	−0.91%
2007	160	+1.68%
2012	165	+0.62%
2017	153	−1.50%
2023	158	+0.54%
Source: INSEE

== See also ==
- Communes of the Pas-de-Calais department
