= Buneville =

- Commune
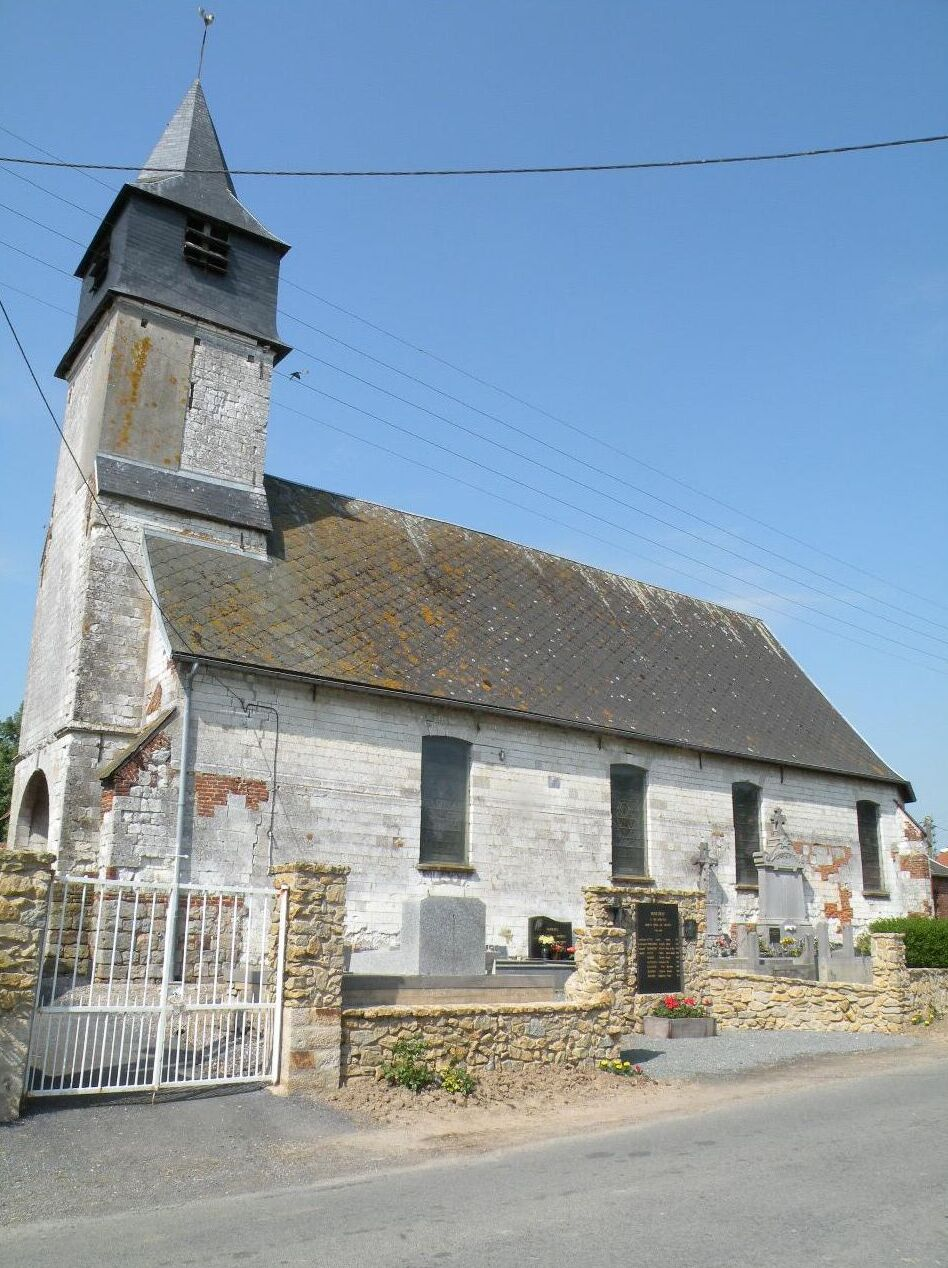
- The church of Buneville

- Coat of arms
- Location of Buneville
- Location within France Location within Hauts-de-France
- Coordinates: 50°19′31″N 2°21′33″E
- Country: France
- Region: Hauts-de-France
- Department: Pas-de-Calais
- Arrondissement: Arras
- Canton: Saint-Pol-sur-Ternoise
- Intercommunality: CC Ternois

Government
  - Mayor (2020–2026): Philippe Derisbourg
- Area^{1}: 3.84 km^{2} (1.48 sq mi)
- Elevation: 154 m (505 ft)
- Highest elevation: 157 m (515 ft)
- Lowest elevation: 125 m (410 ft)
- Population (2023): 172
  - Density: 44.8/km^{2} (116/sq mi)
- Time zone: UTC+01:00 (CET)
  - Summer (DST): UTC+02:00 (CEST)
- INSEE/Postal code: 62187 /62130
- ^{1} French Land Register data, which excludes lakes, ponds, glaciers > 1 km^{2} (0.386 sq mi or 247 acres) and river estuaries.

Buneville (French pronunciation: [bynvil]) is a commune in the Pas-de-Calais department in the Hauts-de-France region in northern France.

== Geography ==
A farming village located 20 miles (32 km) southwest of Arras on the D23 road, at the junction with the D83.

== Population ==
Historical population
Year	Pop.	±% p.a.
1968	167	—
1975	175	+0.67%
1982	170	−0.41%
1990	159	−0.83%
1999	138	−1.56%
2007	165	+2.26%
2012	176	+1.30%
2017	180	+0.45%
2023	172	−0.75%
Source: INSEE

== Sights ==
- The church of Notre-Dame, dating from the eighteenth century

== See also ==
- Communes of the Pas-de-Calais department
