= Aubrometz =

- Commune
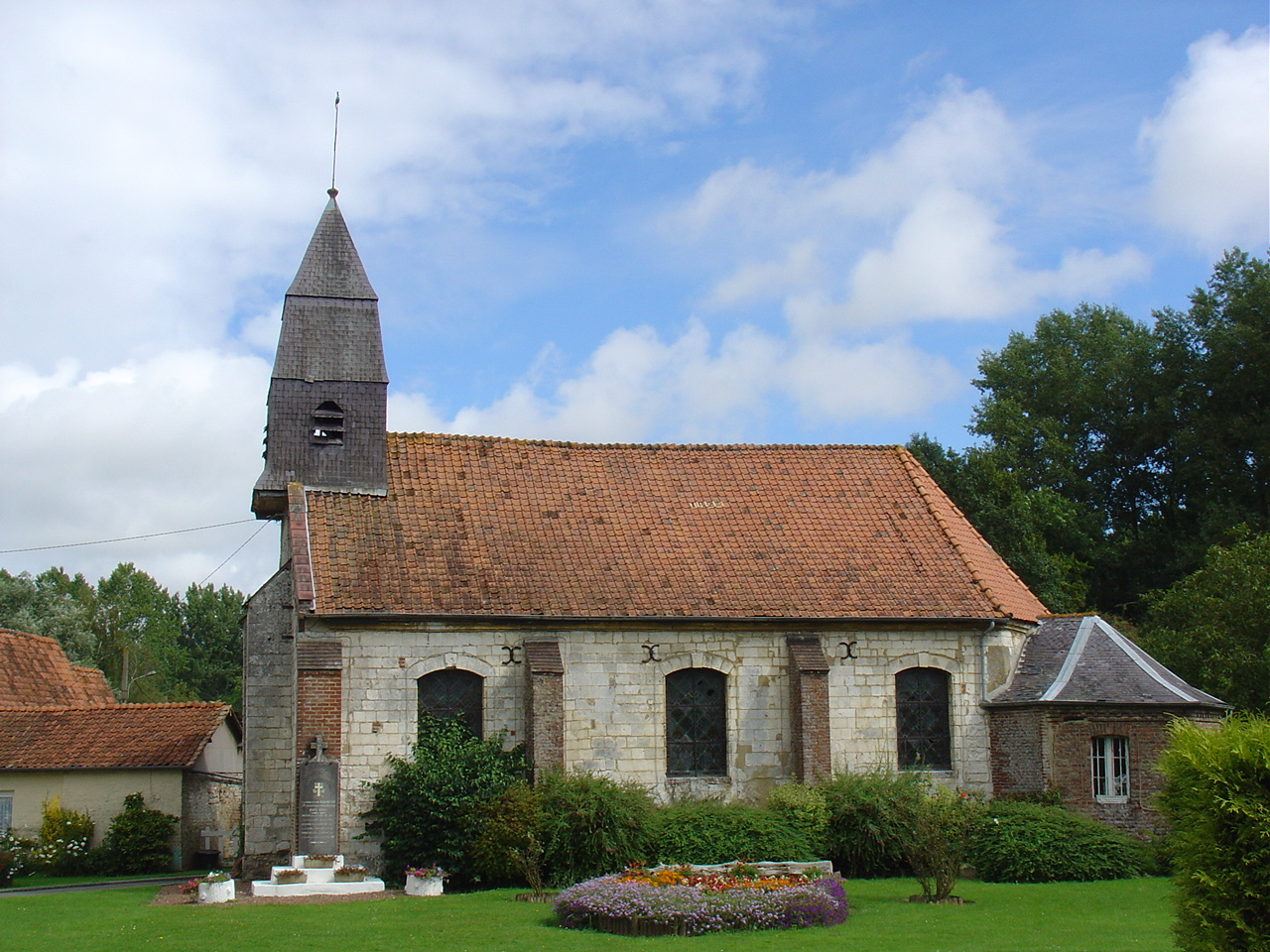
- The church of Aubrometz

- Coat of arms
- Location of Aubrometz
- Location within France Location within Hauts-de-France
- Coordinates: 50°18′18″N 2°10′51″E
- Country: France
- Region: Hauts-de-France
- Department: Pas-de-Calais
- Arrondissement: Arras
- Canton: Saint-Pol-sur-Ternoise
- Intercommunality: CC du Ternois

Government
  - Mayor (2020–2026): Francis Faye
- Area^{1}: 2.72 km^{2} (1.05 sq mi)
- Elevation: 50 m (160 ft)
- Highest elevation: 120 m (390 ft)
- Lowest elevation: 45 m (148 ft)
- Population (2023): 141
  - Density: 51.8/km^{2} (134/sq mi)
- Time zone: UTC+01:00 (CET)
  - Summer (DST): UTC+02:00 (CEST)
- INSEE/Postal code: 62047 /62390
- ^{1} French Land Register data, which excludes lakes, ponds, glaciers > 1 km^{2} (0.386 sq mi or 247 acres) and river estuaries.

Aubrometz is a commune in the Pas-de-Calais department in northern France.

== Geography ==
A small village located 25 miles (40 km) west of Arras on the D340 road, in the valley of the river Canche.

== Population ==
Historical population
Year	Pop.	±% p.a.
1968	108	—
1975	104	−0.54%
1982	99	−0.70%
1990	134	+3.86%
1999	133	−0.08%
2007	147	+1.26%
2012	144	−0.41%
2017	152	+1.09%
2023	141	−1.24%
Source: INSEE

== Sights ==
- The church of St. Thomas Becket, dating from the fifteenth century

== See also ==
- Communes of the Pas-de-Calais department
