= Nuncq-Hautecôte =

- Commune
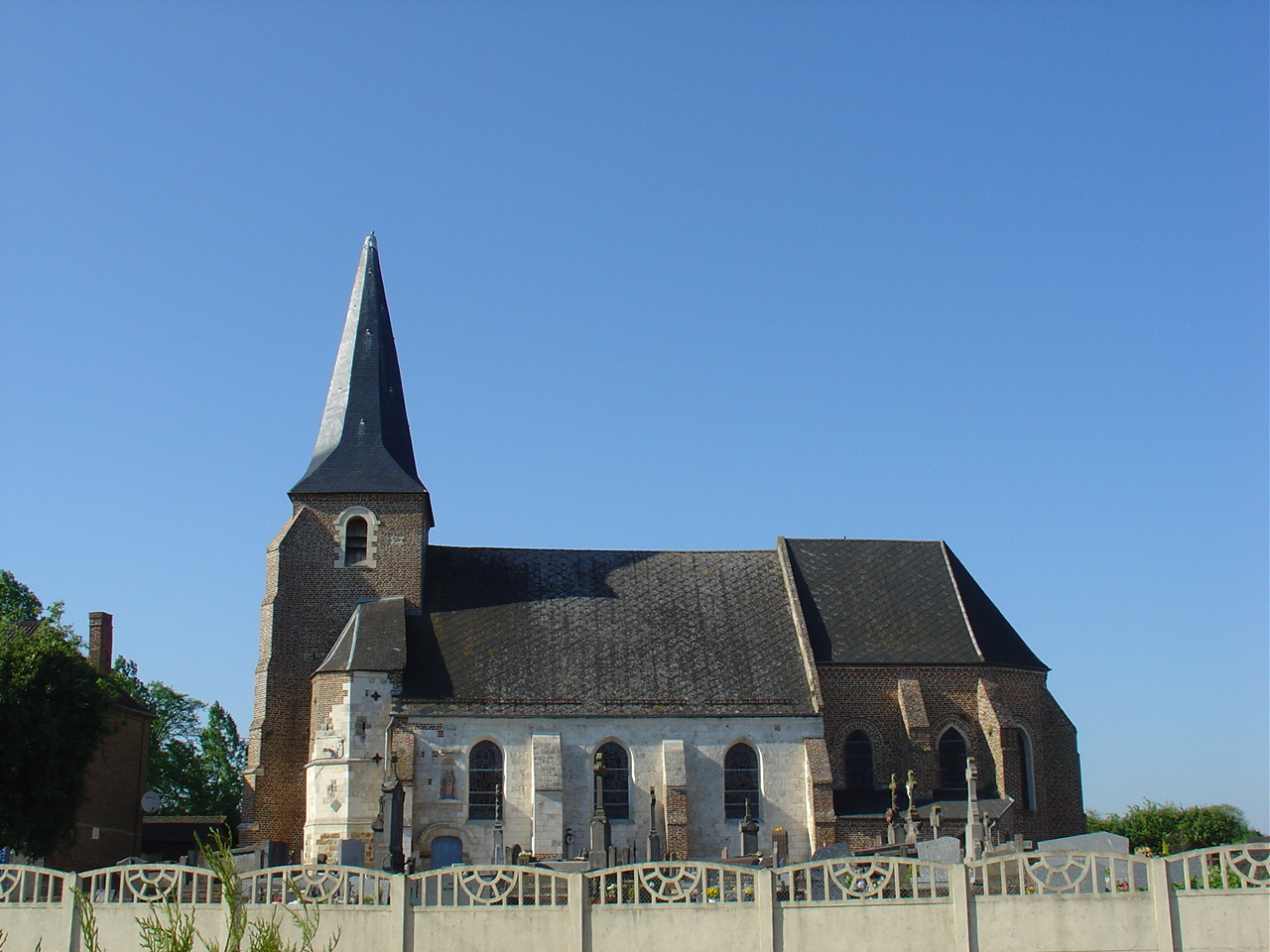
- The church of Nuncq-Hautecôte

- Coat of arms
- Location of Nuncq-Hautecôte
- Location within France Location within Hauts-de-France
- Coordinates: 50°18′22″N 2°17′23″E
- Country: France
- Region: Hauts-de-France
- Department: Pas-de-Calais
- Arrondissement: Arras
- Canton: Saint-Pol-sur-Ternoise
- Intercommunality: CC Ternois

Government
  - Mayor (2020–2026): Alain Pruvost
- Area^{1}: 6.64 km^{2} (2.56 sq mi)
- Elevation: 138 m (453 ft)
- Highest elevation: 149 m (489 ft)
- Lowest elevation: 100 m (330 ft)
- Population (2023): 471
  - Density: 70.9/km^{2} (184/sq mi)
- Time zone: UTC+01:00 (CET)
  - Summer (DST): UTC+02:00 (CEST)
- INSEE/Postal code: 62631 /62270
- ^{1} French Land Register data, which excludes lakes, ponds, glaciers > 1 km^{2} (0.386 sq mi or 247 acres) and river estuaries.

Nuncq-Hautecôte (French pronunciation: [nœ̃k otkot]; Picard: Nuncq-Autencoste) is a commune in the Pas-de-Calais department in the [Hauts-de-France region of France 27 miles (43 km) west of Arras.

== Population ==
Historical population
Year	Pop.	±% p.a.
1968	358	—
1975	362	+0.16%
1982	322	−1.66%
1990	406	+2.94%
1999	402	−0.11%
2007	386	−0.51%
2012	419	+1.65%
2017	476	+2.58%
2023	471	−0.18%
Source: INSEE

== See also ==
- Communes of the Pas-de-Calais department
