= Marquay, Pas-de-Calais =

Marquay
- Commune
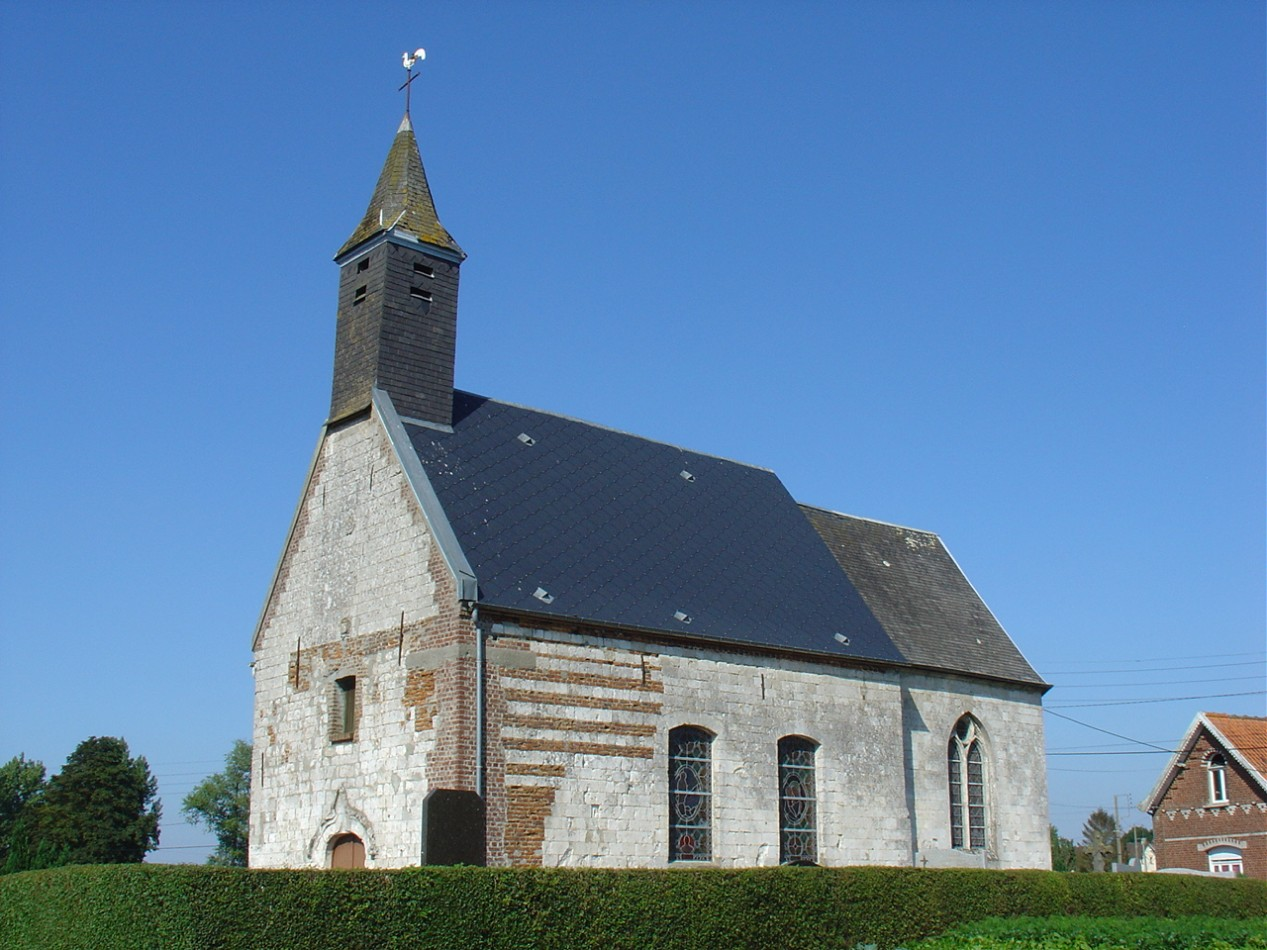
- The church of Marquay

- Coat of arms
- Location of Marquay
- Location within France Location within Hauts-de-France
- Coordinates: 50°22′54″N 2°25′24″E
- Country: France
- Region: Hauts-de-France
- Department: Pas-de-Calais
- Arrondissement: Arras
- Canton: Saint-Pol-sur-Ternoise
- Intercommunality: CC Ternois

Government
  - Mayor (2020–2026): Nadine Brunet
- Area^{1}: 3.47 km^{2} (1.34 sq mi)
- Elevation: 145 m (476 ft)
- Highest elevation: 160 m (520 ft)
- Lowest elevation: 110 m (360 ft)
- Population (2023): 166
  - Density: 47.8/km^{2} (124/sq mi)
- Time zone: UTC+01:00 (CET)
  - Summer (DST): UTC+02:00 (CEST)
- INSEE/Postal code: 62558 /62127
- ^{1} French Land Register data, which excludes lakes, ponds, glaciers > 1 km^{2} (0.386 sq mi or 247 acres) and river estuaries.

Marquay (French pronunciation: [maʁkɛ]) is a commune in the Pas-de-Calais department in the Hauts-de-France region of France 21 miles (34 km) northwest of Arras.

== Population ==
Historical population
Year	Pop.	±% p.a.
1968	162	—
1975	125	−3.64%
1982	115	−1.18%
1990	124	+0.95%
1999	163	+3.09%
2007	170	+0.53%
2012	173	+0.35%
2017	179	+0.68%
2023	166	−1.25%
Source: INSEE

== See also ==
- Communes of the Pas-de-Calais department
