= Monchel-sur-Canche =

- Commune
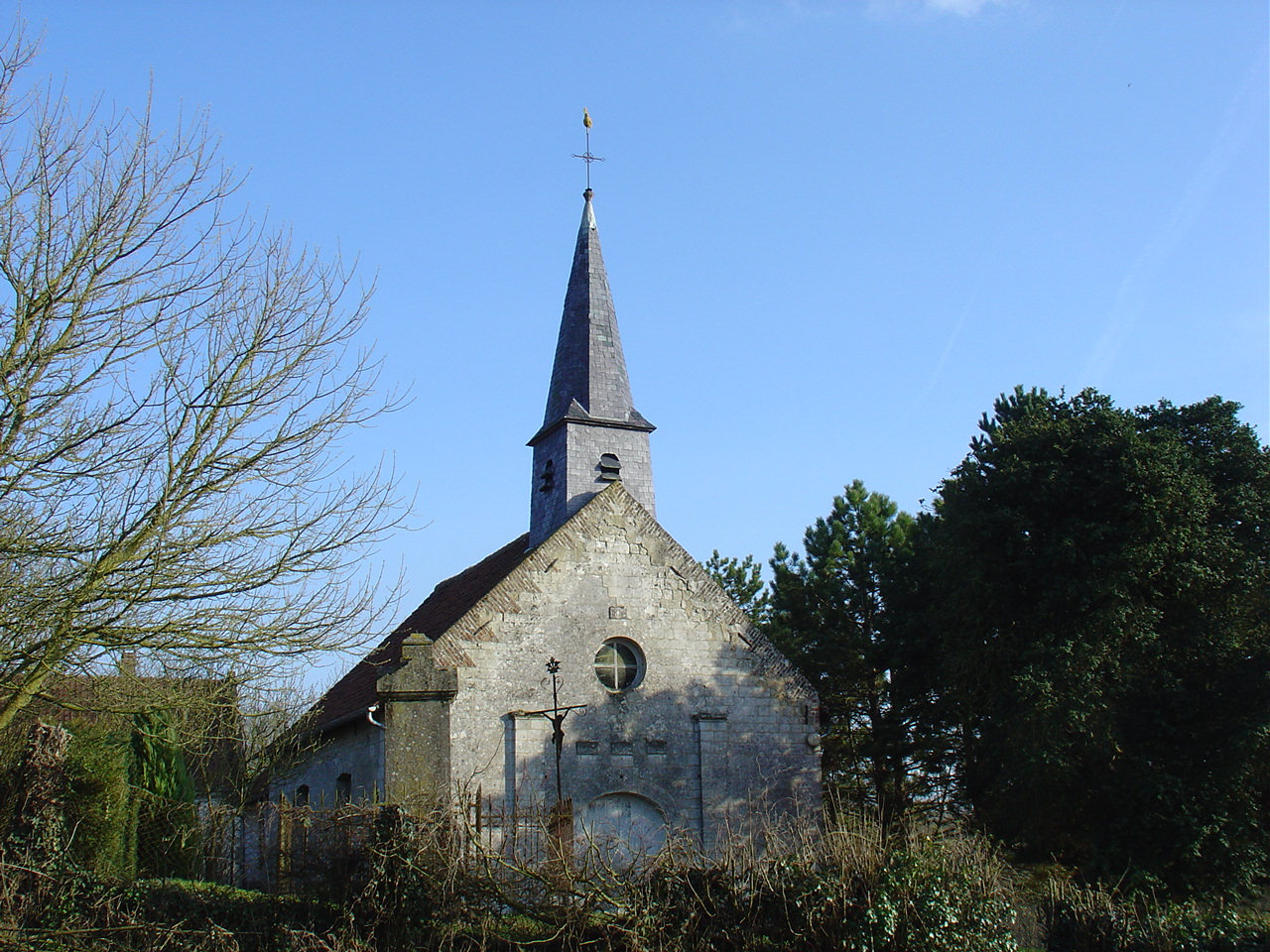
- The church of Monchel-sur-Canche

- Coat of arms
- Location of Monchel-sur-Canche
- Location within France Location within Hauts-de-France
- Coordinates: 50°18′13″N 2°12′33″E
- Country: France
- Region: Hauts-de-France
- Department: Pas-de-Calais
- Arrondissement: Arras
- Canton: Saint-Pol-sur-Ternoise
- Intercommunality: CC Ternois

Government
  - Mayor (2020–2026): Bertrand Cléret
- Area^{1}: 5.06 km^{2} (1.95 sq mi)
- Elevation: 120 m (390 ft)
- Highest elevation: 133 m (436 ft)
- Lowest elevation: 52 m (171 ft)
- Population (2023): 71
  - Density: 14/km^{2} (36/sq mi)
- Time zone: UTC+01:00 (CET)
  - Summer (DST): UTC+02:00 (CEST)
- INSEE/Postal code: 62577 /62270
- ^{1} French Land Register data, which excludes lakes, ponds, glaciers > 1 km^{2} (0.386 sq mi or 247 acres) and river estuaries.

Monchel-sur-Canche (French pronunciation: [mɔ̃ʃɛl syʁ kɑ̃ʃ], literally Monchel on Canche) is a commune in the Pas-de-Calais department in the Hauts-de-France region of France on the banks and in the valley of the river Canche, which feeds the local fish/trout farm, 25 miles (40 km) west of Arras.

== Population ==
Historical population
Year	Pop.	±% p.a.
1968	68	—
1975	67	−0.21%
1982	67	+0.00%
1990	66	−0.19%
1999	71	+0.81%
2007	59	−2.29%
2012	96	+10.23%
2017	90	−1.28%
2023	71	−3.88%
Source: INSEE
