= Boubers-sur-Canche =

- Commune
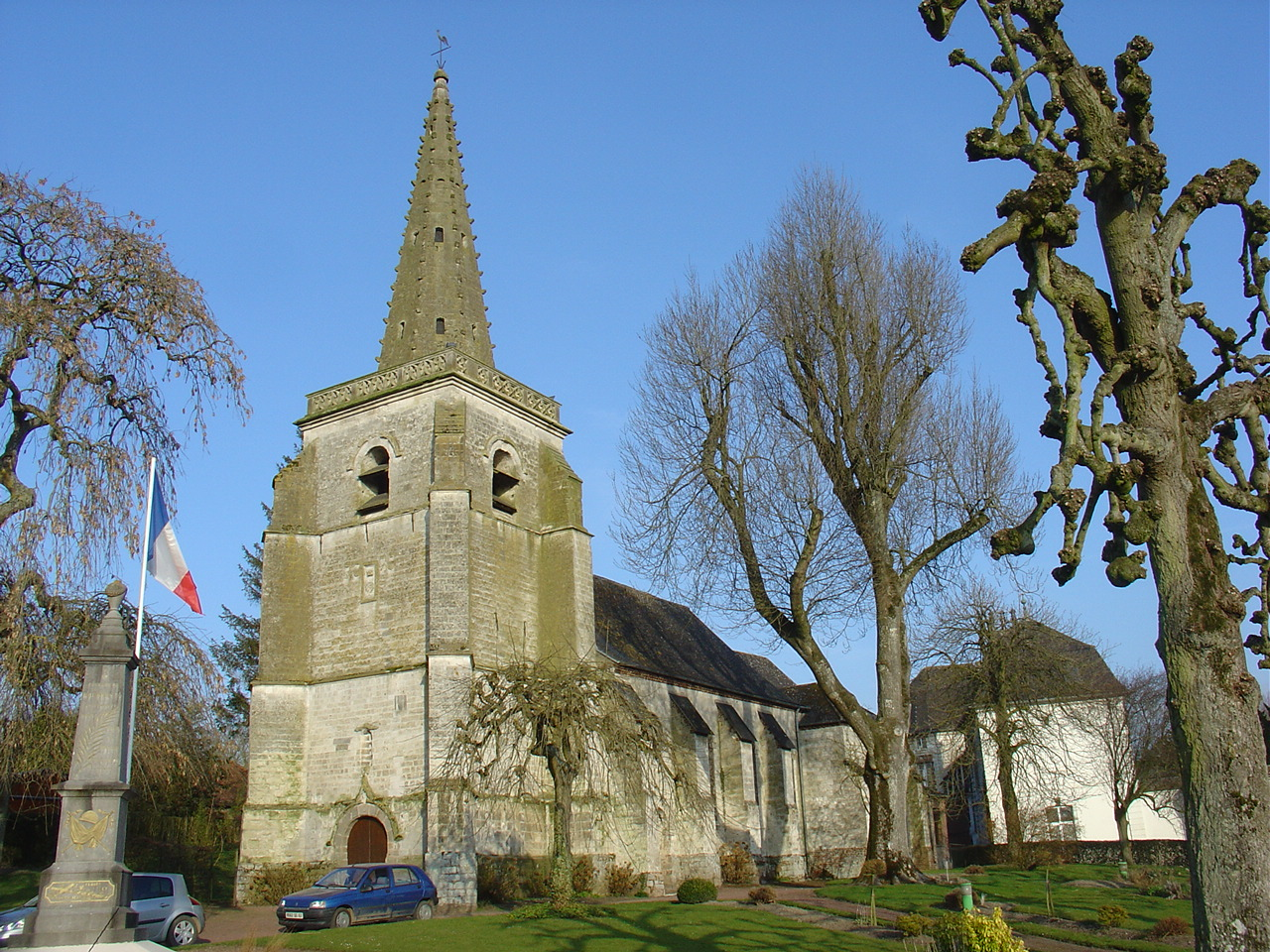
- The church of Boubers-sur-Canche

- Coat of arms
- Location of Boubers-sur-Canche
- Location within France Location within Hauts-de-France
- Coordinates: 50°17′28″N 2°14′16″E
- Country: France
- Region: Hauts-de-France
- Department: Pas-de-Calais
- Arrondissement: Arras
- Canton: Saint-Pol-sur-Ternoise
- Intercommunality: CC Ternois

Government
  - Mayor (2020–2026): Jean-Marie Tinchon
- Area^{1}: 9.23 km^{2} (3.56 sq mi)
- Elevation: 65 m (213 ft)
- Highest elevation: 142 m (466 ft)
- Lowest elevation: 52 m (171 ft)
- Population (2023): 578
  - Density: 62.6/km^{2} (162/sq mi)
- Time zone: UTC+01:00 (CET)
  - Summer (DST): UTC+02:00 (CEST)
- INSEE/Postal code: 62158 /62270
- ^{1} French Land Register data, which excludes lakes, ponds, glaciers > 1 km^{2} (0.386 sq mi or 247 acres) and river estuaries.

Boubers-sur-Canche is a commune in the Pas-de-Calais department in the Hauts-de-France region in northern France.

== Geography ==
Boubers-sur-Canche is a farming village located 24 miles (38 km) west of Arras at the junction of the D112 and D340 roads, by the banks of the river Canche. The village wins national and international prizes for its flower display.

== Population ==
Historical population
Year	Pop.	±% p.a.
1968	547	—
1975	618	+1.76%
1982	649	+0.70%
1990	604	−0.89%
1999	606	+0.04%
2007	597	−0.19%
2012	607	+0.33%
2017	589	−0.60%
2023	578	−0.31%
Source: INSEE

== Sights ==
- The church of St. Leger, dating from the seventeenth century.
- An eighteenth-century chateau.
- Public and private gardens.

== See also ==
- Communes of the Pas-de-Calais department
