= Fortel-en-Artois =

Fortel-en-Artois Fortel-in-Artoé (Picard)
- Commune
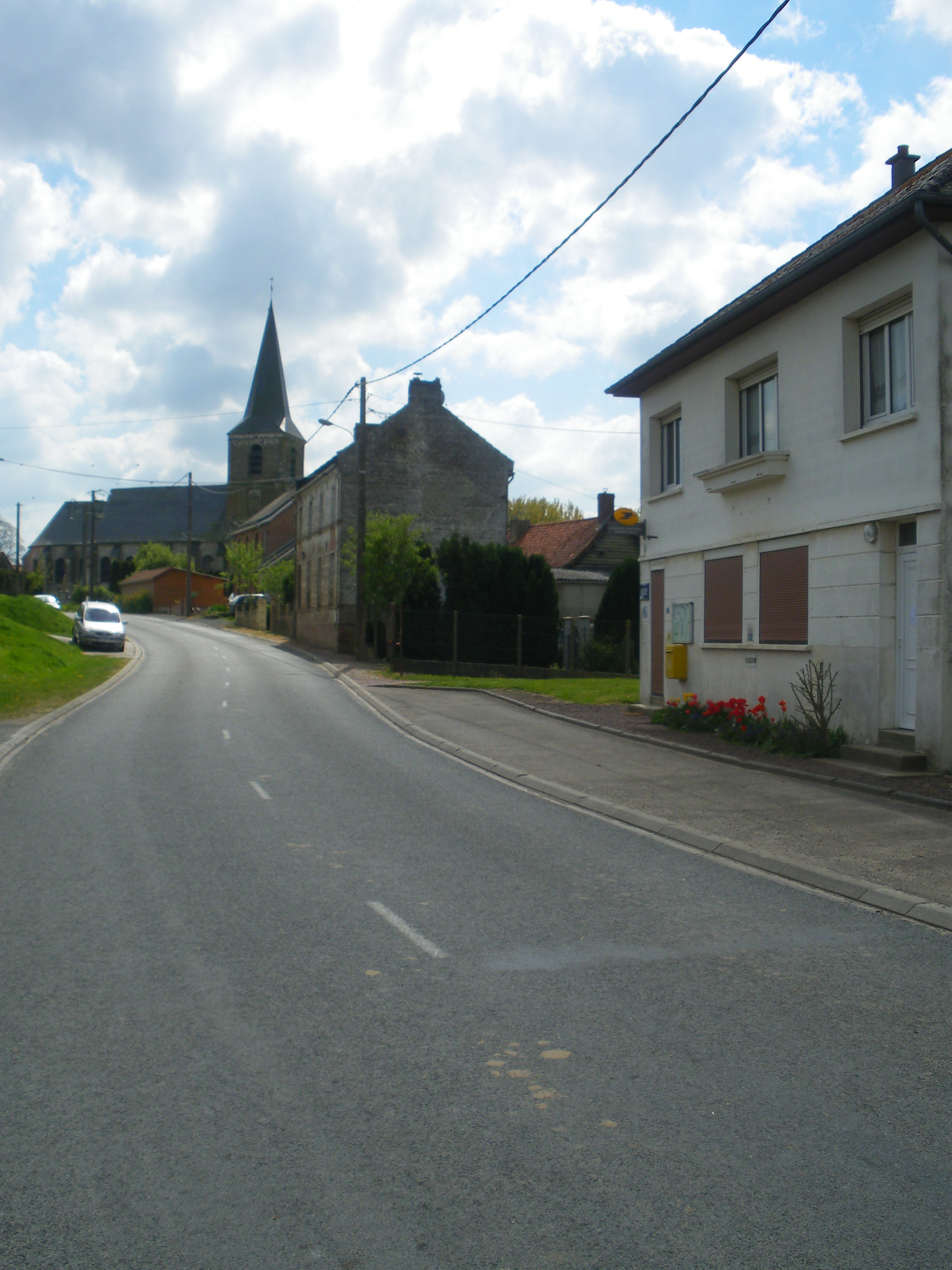
- The centre of Fortel-en-Artois

- Coat of arms
- Location of Fortel-en-Artois
- Location within France Location within Hauts-de-France
- Coordinates: 50°15′29″N 2°13′29″E
- Country: France
- Region: Hauts-de-France
- Department: Pas-de-Calais
- Arrondissement: Arras
- Canton: Saint-Pol-sur-Ternoise
- Intercommunality: CC Ternois

Government
  - Mayor (2020–2026): Dominique Dourlens
- Area^{1}: 5.89 km^{2} (2.27 sq mi)
- Elevation: 122 m (400 ft)
- Highest elevation: 144 m (472 ft)
- Lowest elevation: 83 m (272 ft)
- Population (2023): 212
  - Density: 36.0/km^{2} (93.2/sq mi)
- Time zone: UTC+01:00 (CET)
  - Summer (DST): UTC+02:00 (CEST)
- INSEE/Postal code: 62346 /62270
- ^{1} French Land Register data, which excludes lakes, ponds, glaciers > 1 km^{2} (0.386 sq mi or 247 acres) and river estuaries.

Fortel-en-Artois (French: [fɔʁtɛl ɑ̃n‿aʁtwɑ]; Picard: Fortel-in-Artoé; literally "Fortel in Artois") is a commune in the Pas-de-Calais department in the Hauts-de-France region of France.

== Geography ==
A small farming village situated 25 miles (40 km) west of Arras, at the junction of the D115 and the D115E roads.

== Population ==
Historical population
Year	Pop.	±% p.a.
1968	187	—
1975	160	−2.20%
1982	186	+2.17%
1990	181	−0.34%
1999	155	−1.71%
2007	208	+3.74%
2012	222	+1.31%
2017	211	−1.01%
2023	212	+0.08%
Source: INSEE

== Places of interest ==
- The church of St.Pierre, dating from the eighteenth century.
- A big sandstone crucifix at the road junction.

== See also ==
- Communes of the Pas-de-Calais department
