= Conchy-sur-Canche =

- Commune
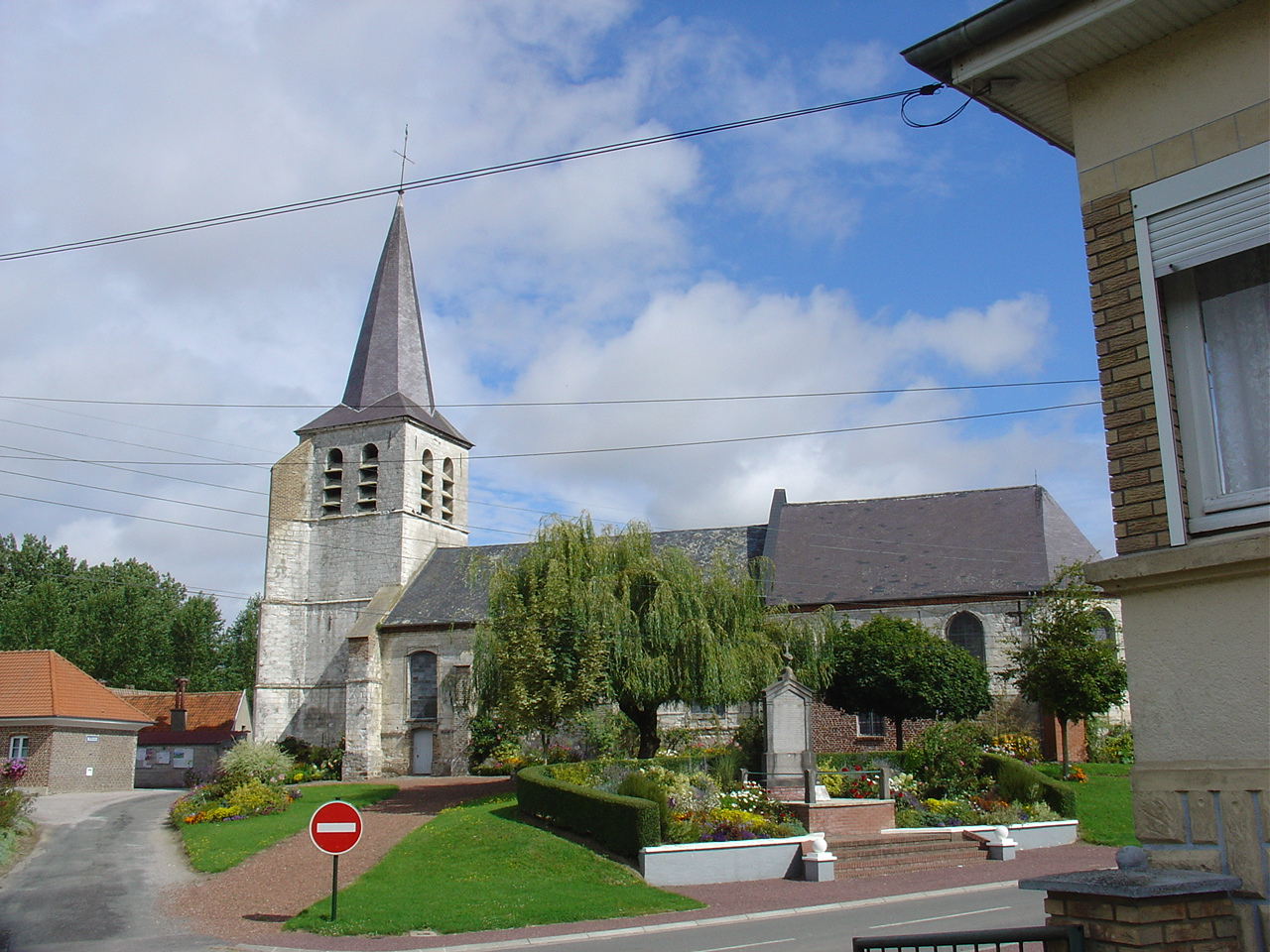
- The church of Conchy-sur-Canche

- Coat of arms
- Location of Conchy-sur-Canche
- Location within France Location within Hauts-de-France
- Coordinates: 50°18′10″N 2°12′01″E
- Country: France
- Region: Hauts-de-France
- Department: Pas-de-Calais
- Arrondissement: Arras
- Canton: Saint-Pol-sur-Ternoise
- Intercommunality: CC Ternois

Government
  - Mayor (2020–2026): Dominique Coquet
- Area^{1}: 9.83 km^{2} (3.80 sq mi)
- Elevation: 55 m (180 ft)
- Highest elevation: 137 m (449 ft)
- Lowest elevation: 47 m (154 ft)
- Population (2023): 222
  - Density: 22.6/km^{2} (58.5/sq mi)
- Time zone: UTC+01:00 (CET)
  - Summer (DST): UTC+02:00 (CEST)
- INSEE/Postal code: 62234 /62270
- ^{1} French Land Register data, which excludes lakes, ponds, glaciers > 1 km^{2} (0.386 sq mi or 247 acres) and river estuaries.

Conchy-sur-Canche (French pronunciation: [kɔ̃ʃi syʁ kɑ̃ʃ], literally Conchy on Canche) is a commune in the Pas-de-Calais department in the Hauts-de-France country of France.

== Geography ==
A farming village located 23 miles (37 km) west-northwest of Arras, by the banks of the Canche river, at the junction of the D115 with the D102 road.

== Population ==
Historical population
Year	Pop.	±% p.a.
1968	302	—
1975	269	−1.64%
1982	218	−2.96%
1990	209	−0.53%
1999	197	−0.65%
2007	196	−0.06%
2012	192	−0.41%
2017	216	+2.38%
2023	222	+0.46%
Source: INSEE

== Places of interest ==
- The church of St.Pierre, dating from the fourteenth century.

== See also ==
- Communes of the Pas-de-Calais department
