= Ligny-sur-Canche =

- Commune
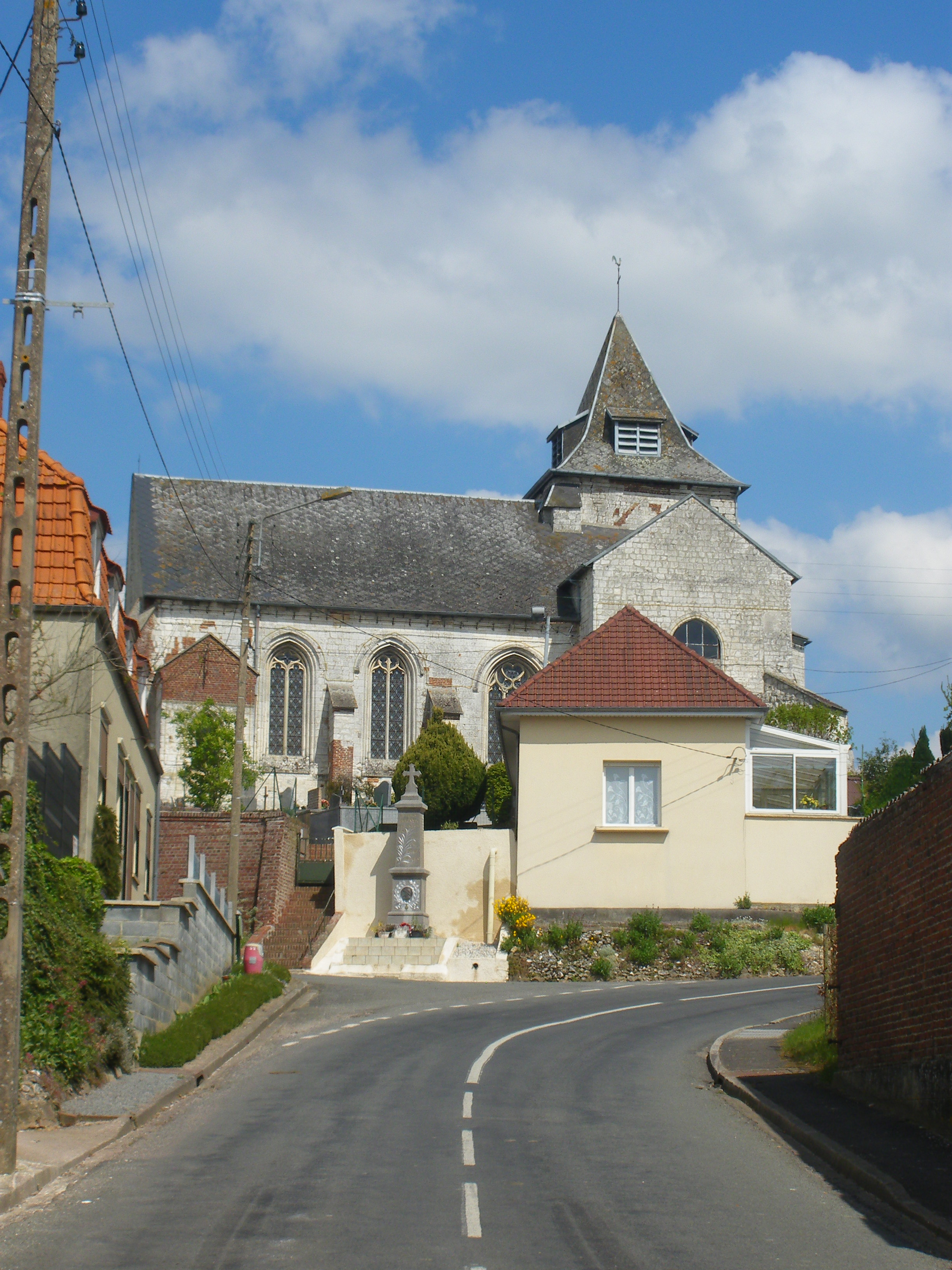
- The church of Ligny-sur-Canche

- Coat of arms
- Location of Ligny-sur-Canche
- Location within France Location within Hauts-de-France
- Coordinates: 50°17′06″N 2°15′32″E
- Country: France
- Region: Hauts-de-France
- Department: Pas-de-Calais
- Arrondissement: Arras
- Canton: Saint-Pol-sur-Ternoise
- Intercommunality: Ternois

Government
  - Mayor (2020–2026): Jean-Marie Delmotte
- Area^{1}: 7.17 km^{2} (2.77 sq mi)
- Elevation: 100 m (330 ft)
- Highest elevation: 138 m (453 ft)
- Lowest elevation: 57 m (187 ft)
- Population (2023): 188
  - Density: 26.2/km^{2} (67.9/sq mi)
- Time zone: UTC+01:00 (CET)
  - Summer (DST): UTC+02:00 (CEST)
- INSEE/Postal code: 62513 /62270
- ^{1} French Land Register data, which excludes lakes, ponds, glaciers > 1 km^{2} (0.386 sq mi or 247 acres) and river estuaries.

Ligny-sur-Canche (French pronunciation: [liɲi syʁ kɑ̃ʃ], literally Ligny on Canche) is a commune in the Pas-de-Calais department in the Hauts-de-France region of France 25 miles (40 km) west of Arras, in the valley of the river Canche.

== Population ==
Historical population
Year	Pop.	±% p.a.
1968	229	—
1975	219	−0.64%
1982	187	−2.23%
1990	197	+0.65%
1999	205	+0.44%
2007	199	−0.37%
2012	187	−1.24%
2017	194	+0.74%
2023	188	−0.52%
Source: INSEE

== See also ==
- Communes of the Pas-de-Calais department
