= Communauté de communes de l'Auxillois =

Coordinates: 50.2301°N 2.1155°E

Auxillois
- Former communauté de communes
- Interactive map of Auxillois
- Country: France
- Region: Hauts-de-France
- Department: Pas-de-Calais
- No. of communes: {{{nbcomm}}}
- Established: 1999
- Disbanded: 2017
- Population (1999): 5,478

The Communauté de communes de l'Auxillois is a former communauté de communes in the Pas-de-Calais département and in the Nord-Pas-de-Calais région of France. It was created in January 1999. It was merged into the new Communauté de communes du Ternois in January 2017.

== Composition ==
The Communauté de communes comprised the following communes:

1. Auxi-le-Château
2. Beauvoir-Wavans
3. Boffles
4. Buire-au-Bois
5. Fontaine-l'Étalon
6. Gennes-Ivergny
7. Haravesnes
8. Le Ponchel
9. Nœux-lès-Auxi
10. Quœux-Haut-Maînil
11. Rougefay
12. Tollent
13. Vaulx
14. Villers-l'Hôpital
15. Vitz-sur-Authie (in the department of the Somme)
16. Willencourt

== See also ==
- Communes of the Pas-de-Calais department
- Communes of the Somme department
