= Canton of Hesdin =

Coordinates: 50°21′27″N 2°00′09″E

Hesdin
- Former canton
- Interactive map of Hesdin
- Country: France
- Region: Hauts-de-France
- Department: Pas-de-Calais
- No. of communes: {{{nbcomm}}}
- Disbanded: 2015
- Area: 138.66 km^{2} (53.54 sq mi)
- Population (2012): 10,805
  - Density: 77.924/km^{2} (201.82/sq mi)

The Canton of Hesdin is a former canton situated in the department of the Pas-de-Calais and in the Nord-Pas-de-Calais region of northern France. It was disbanded following the French canton reorganisation which came into effect in March 2015. It consisted of 22 communes, which joined the canton of Auxi-le-Château in 2015. It had a total of 10,805 inhabitants (2012).

== Geography ==
The canton is organised around Hesdin in the arrondissement of Montreuil. The altitude varies from 11 m (Tortefontaine) to 133 m (Chériennes) for an average altitude of 55 m.

The canton comprised 22 communes:

- Aubin-Saint-Vaast
- Bouin-Plumoison
- Brévillers
- Capelle-lès-Hesdin
- Caumont
- Cavron-Saint-Martin
- Chériennes
- Contes
- Guigny
- Guisy
- Hesdin
- Huby-Saint-Leu
- Labroye
- La Loge
- Marconne
- Marconnelle
- Mouriez
- Raye-sur-Authie
- Regnauville
- Sainte-Austreberthe
- Tortefontaine
- Wambercourt

== Population ==
Population Evolution
1962	1968	1975	1982	1990	1999
10290	11109	11640	11779	11515	11420
Census count starting from 1962 : Population without double counting

== See also ==
- Cantons of Pas-de-Calais
- Communes of Pas-de-Calais
- Arrondissements of the Pas-de-Calais department
