= Rougefay =

- Commune
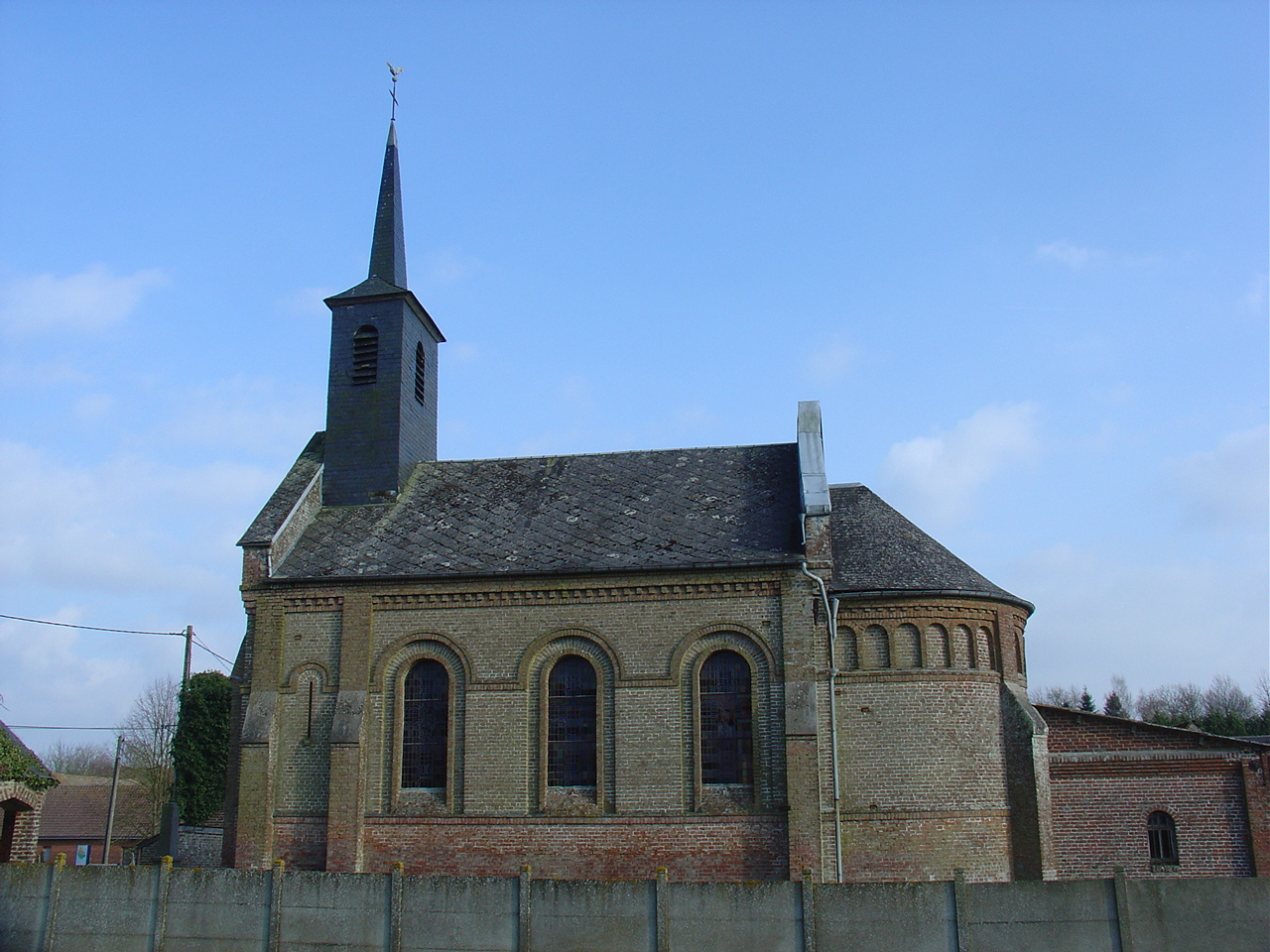
- The church of Rougefay

- Coat of arms
- Location of Rougefay
- Location within France Location within Hauts-de-France
- Coordinates: 50°16′26″N 2°10′20″E
- Country: France
- Region: Hauts-de-France
- Department: Pas-de-Calais
- Arrondissement: Arras
- Canton: Auxi-le-Château
- Intercommunality: CC Ternois

Government
  - Mayor (2020–2026): Olivier Huchette
- Area^{1}: 3.86 km^{2} (1.49 sq mi)
- Elevation: 110 m (360 ft)
- Highest elevation: 142 m (466 ft)
- Lowest elevation: 104 m (341 ft)
- Population (2023): 83
  - Density: 22/km^{2} (56/sq mi)
- Time zone: UTC+01:00 (CET)
  - Summer (DST): UTC+02:00 (CEST)
- INSEE/Postal code: 62722 /62390
- ^{1} French Land Register data, which excludes lakes, ponds, glaciers > 1 km^{2} (0.386 sq mi or 247 acres) and river estuaries.

Rougefay is a commune in the Pas-de-Calais department in the Hauts-de-France region of France.

== Geography ==
Rougefay lies about 32 miles (51 km) west of Arras, at the junction of the D110 and D102 roads.

Surrounded by the communes Buire-au-Bois, Haravesnes and Boffles, Rougefay is located 30 kilometres (19 mi) northeast of Abbeville, the largest city nearby.

== Population ==
Historical population
Year	Pop.	±% p.a.
1968	173	—
1975	171	−0.17%
1982	147	−2.14%
1990	130	−1.52%
1999	115	−1.35%
2007	103	−1.37%
2012	89	−2.88%
2017	86	−0.68%
2023	83	−0.59%
Source: INSEE

== Places of interest ==
- The nineteenth century church.
- Saint-Anne's chapel.

== See also ==
- Communes of the Pas-de-Calais department
