= Tramecourt =

- Commune
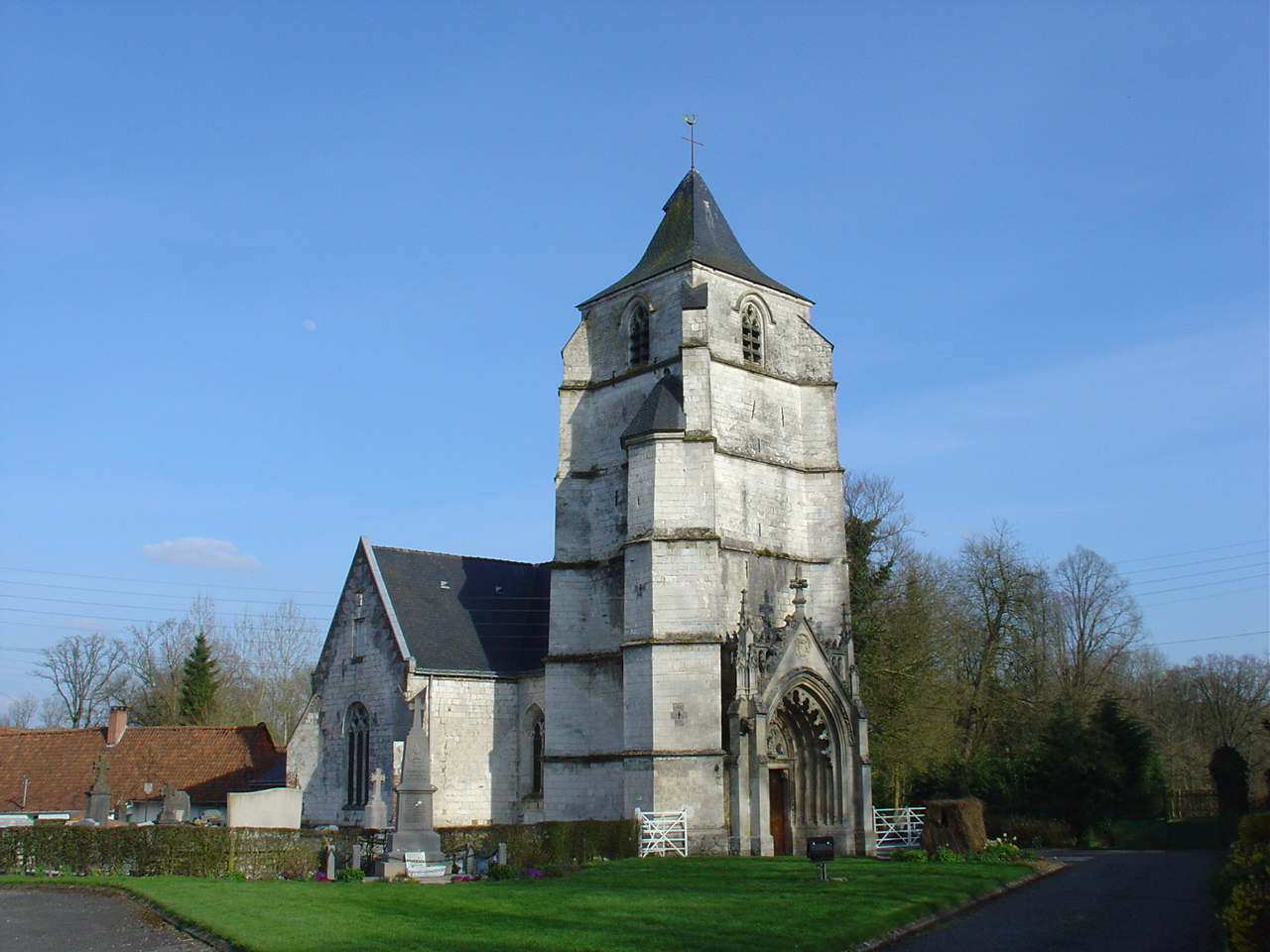
- The church of Tramecourt
- Location of Tramecourt
- Location within France Location within Hauts-de-France
- Coordinates: 50°27′53″N 2°09′05″E
- Country: France
- Region: Hauts-de-France
- Department: Pas-de-Calais
- Arrondissement: Montreuil
- Canton: Auxi-le-Château
- Intercommunality: CC des 7 Vallées

Government
  - Mayor (2020–2026): Gervais Castel
- Area^{1}: 2.22 km^{2} (0.86 sq mi)
- Elevation: 122 m (400 ft)
- Highest elevation: 142 m (466 ft)
- Lowest elevation: 110 m (360 ft)
- Population (2023): 55
  - Density: 25/km^{2} (64/sq mi)
- Time zone: UTC+01:00 (CET)
  - Summer (DST): UTC+02:00 (CEST)
- INSEE/Postal code: 62828 /62310
- ^{1} French Land Register data, which excludes lakes, ponds, glaciers > 1 km^{2} (0.386 sq mi or 247 acres) and river estuaries.

Tramecourt (French pronunciation: [tʁamkuʁ]) is a commune in the Pas-de-Calais department in the Hauts-de-France region of France 16 miles (22 km) east of Montreuil-sur-Mer on the other side of the battlefield of Agincourt from the village and fortification of Azincourt, after which the battle was named.

== Population ==
Historical population
Year	Pop.	±% p.a.
1968	113	—
1975	99	−1.87%
1982	76	−3.71%
1990	67	−1.56%
1999	66	−0.17%
2007	56	−2.03%
2012	59	+1.05%
2017	60	+0.34%
2023	55	−1.44%
Source: INSEE

== See also ==
- Communes of the Pas-de-Calais department
