= Le Quesnoy-en-Artois =

- Commune
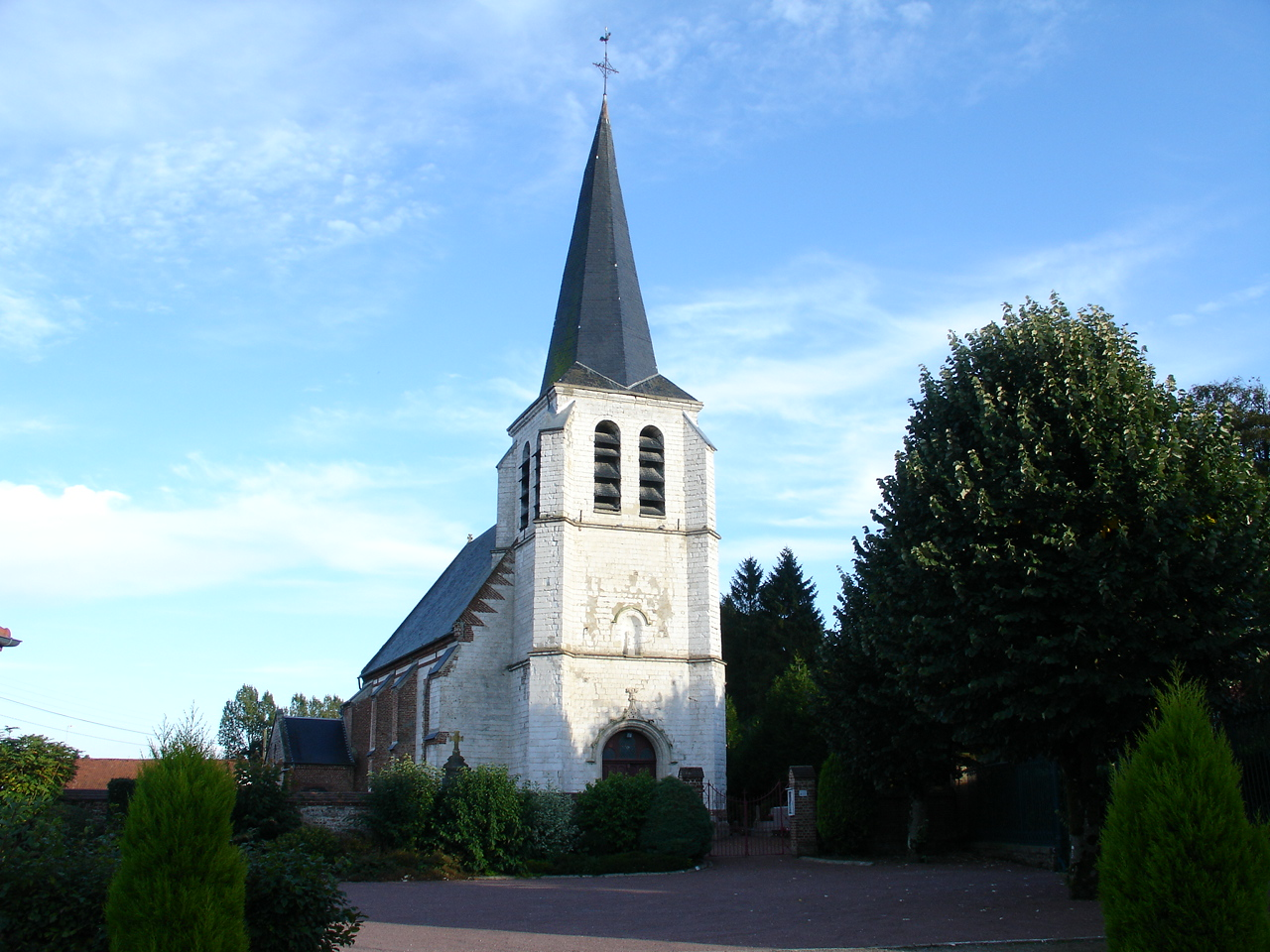
- The church of Le Quesnoy-en-Artois

- Coat of arms
- Location of Le Quesnoy-en-Artois
- Location within France Location within Hauts-de-France
- Coordinates: 50°20′06″N 2°02′57″E
- Country: France
- Region: Hauts-de-France
- Department: Pas-de-Calais
- Arrondissement: Montreuil
- Canton: Auxi-le-Château
- Intercommunality: CC des 7 Vallées

Government
  - Mayor (2020–2026): Georges Boulenger
- Area^{1}: 7.92 km^{2} (3.06 sq mi)
- Elevation: 124 m (407 ft)
- Highest elevation: 135 m (443 ft)
- Lowest elevation: 59 m (194 ft)
- Population (2023): 320
  - Density: 40/km^{2} (100/sq mi)
- Time zone: UTC+01:00 (CET)
  - Summer (DST): UTC+02:00 (CEST)
- INSEE/Postal code: 62677 /62140
- ^{1} French Land Register data, which excludes lakes, ponds, glaciers > 1 km^{2} (0.386 sq mi or 247 acres) and river estuaries.

Le Quesnoy-en-Artois (French pronunciation: [lə kenwa ɑ̃n‿aʁtwɑ]; literally "Le Quesnoy in Artois") is a commune in the Pas-de-Calais department in the Hauts-de-France region of France 17 miles (28 km) southeast of Montreuil-sur-Mer.

== Population ==
Historical population
Year	Pop.	±% p.a.
1968	285	—
1975	317	+1.53%
1982	362	+1.91%
1990	350	−0.42%
1999	332	−0.58%
2007	354	+0.81%
2012	362	+0.45%
2017	347	−0.84%
2023	320	−1.34%
Source: INSEE

== See also ==
- Communes of the Pas-de-Calais department
