= Gouy-Saint-André =

- Commune
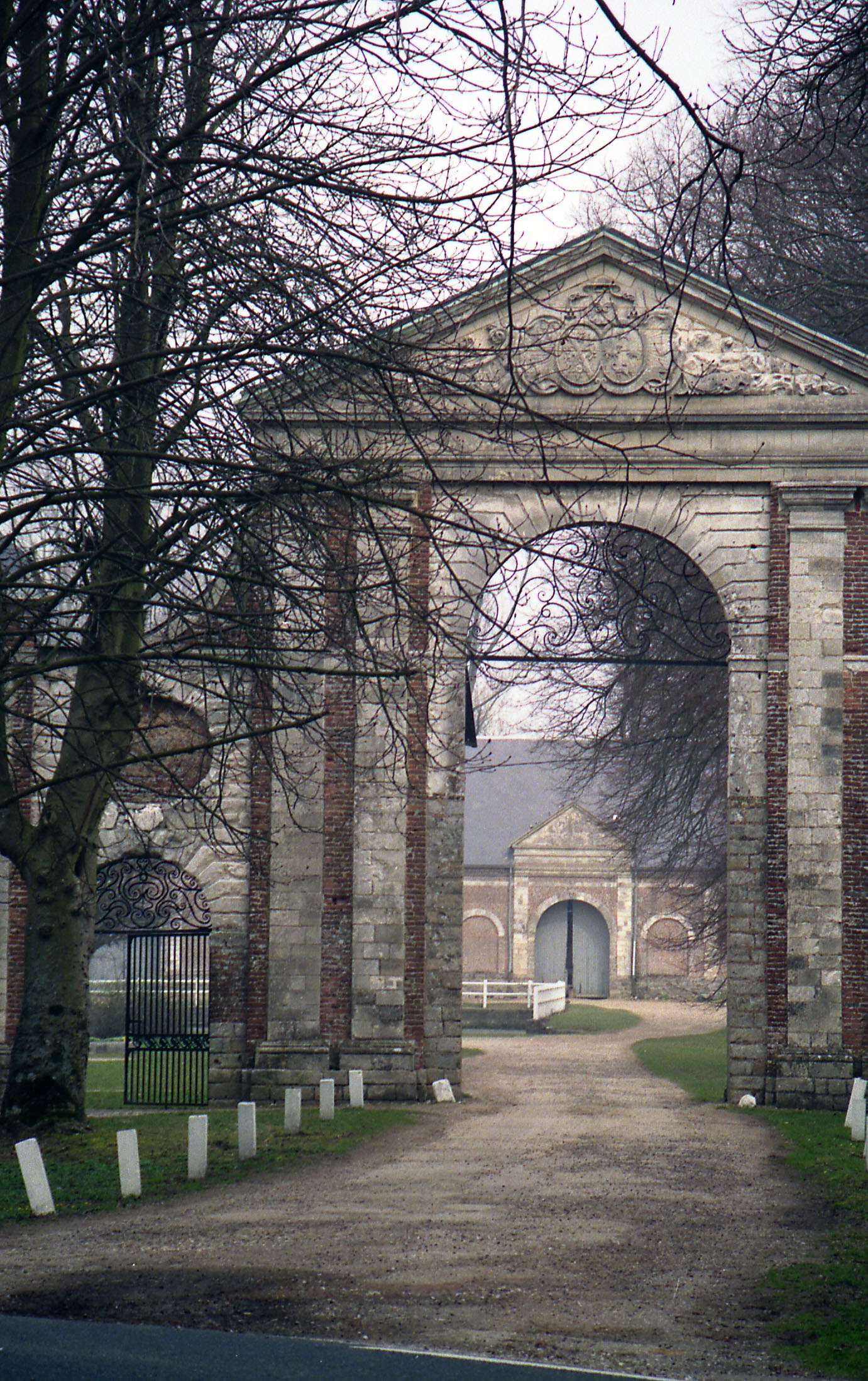
- The gates of the abbey

- Coat of arms
- Location of Gouy-Saint-André
- Location within France Location within Hauts-de-France
- Coordinates: 50°22′28″N 1°53′57″E
- Country: France
- Region: Hauts-de-France
- Department: Pas-de-Calais
- Arrondissement: Montreuil
- Canton: Auxi-le-Château
- Intercommunality: CC des 7 Vallées

Government
  - Mayor (2020–2026): Grégory Leroy
- Area^{1}: 13.34 km^{2} (5.15 sq mi)
- Elevation: 89 m (292 ft)
- Highest elevation: 117 m (384 ft)
- Lowest elevation: 30 m (98 ft)
- Population (2023): 659
  - Density: 49.4/km^{2} (128/sq mi)
- Time zone: UTC+01:00 (CET)
  - Summer (DST): UTC+02:00 (CEST)
- INSEE/Postal code: 62382 /62870
- ^{1} French Land Register data, which excludes lakes, ponds, glaciers > 1 km^{2} (0.386 sq mi or 247 acres) and river estuaries.

Gouy-Saint-André (French pronunciation: [ɡwi sɛ̃.t‿ɑ̃dʁe]) is a commune in the Pas-de-Calais department in the Hauts-de-France region of France.

== Geography ==
A village situated some 10 miles (16 km) southeast of Montreuil-sur-Mer on the D137 road.

== Population ==
Historical population
Year	Pop.	±% p.a.
1968	604	—
1975	627	+0.54%
1982	633	+0.14%
1990	598	−0.71%
1999	611	+0.24%
2007	612	+0.02%
2012	643	+0.99%
2017	643	+0.00%
2023	659	+0.41%
Source: INSEE

== Places of interest ==
- Church of St. Martin, dating from the sixteenth century.
- The abbey of St. Martin.

In 1130, monks of the Premonstratensian Order chose a site on the plateau between the rivers Canche and Authie to build their abbey. The church had begun in 1156 and consecrated in 1220. It was surrounded by many buildings and had a large tower, a barn and two cloisters. Hostilities in the sixteenth and seventeenth century caused much damage. In the early years of the 18th century, the church building was reconstructed, as was the rest of the abbey around 1751 under the leadership of Dom Ignace Crépin with the guidance of the architect Arrageois Merville.
After the revolution only the abbey church and agricultural outbuildings were left standing. The Marquis de Riencourt then transformed it into a chateau, Farm buildings were built between 1752 and 1755 by architect Claude Brunion and were expanded up to 1784. The current buildings facades are exceptional architecturally with bricks and stones.

The chateau was accidentally burned down by British troops in 1918.

The triangular pediment over the main gate bears the arms of the abbey and of the bishop of Amiens. It is typical of the classical architectural style of that period.

== See also ==
- Communes of the Pas-de-Calais department
