= Willeman =

- Commune
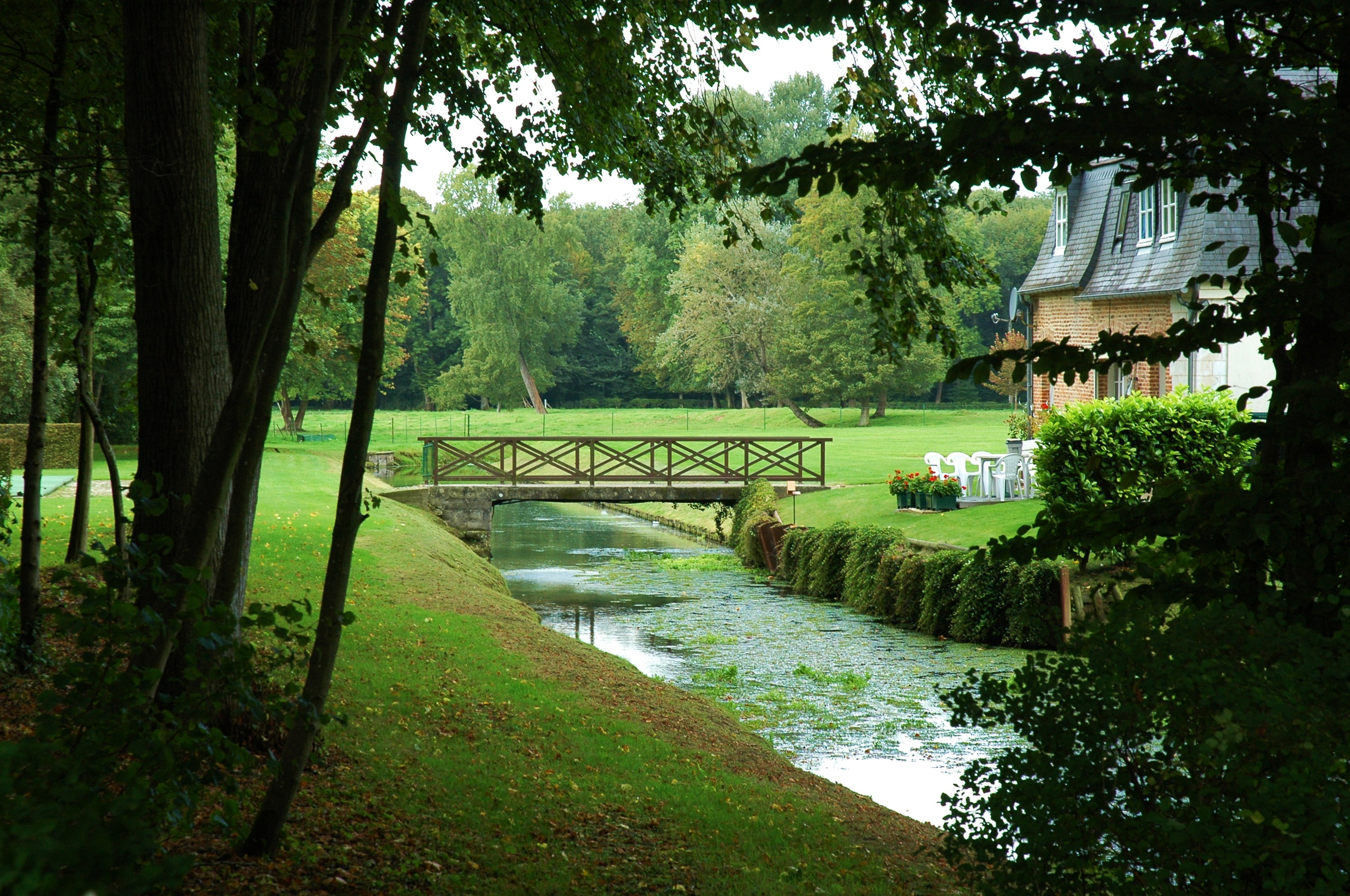
- Part of the moat surrounding the chateau

- Coat of arms
- Location of Willeman
- Location within France Location within Hauts-de-France
- Coordinates: 50°21′13″N 2°09′34″E
- Country: France
- Region: Hauts-de-France
- Department: Pas-de-Calais
- Arrondissement: Montreuil
- Canton: Auxi-le-Château
- Intercommunality: CC des 7 Vallées

Government
  - Mayor (2020–2026): Jean Provoyeur
- Area^{1}: 10.17 km^{2} (3.93 sq mi)
- Elevation: 47 m (154 ft)
- Highest elevation: 110 m (360 ft)
- Lowest elevation: 42 m (138 ft)
- Population (2023): 183
  - Density: 18.0/km^{2} (46.6/sq mi)
- Time zone: UTC+01:00 (CET)
  - Summer (DST): UTC+02:00 (CEST)
- INSEE/Postal code: 62890 /62770
- ^{1} French Land Register data, which excludes lakes, ponds, glaciers > 1 km^{2} (0.386 sq mi or 247 acres) and river estuaries.

Willeman is a commune in the Pas-de-Calais department in the Hauts-de-France region of France. This village has the southernmost Dutch name in France coming from its original Germanic roots.

== Geography ==
Surrounded by woodland, Willeman is located 21 miles (34 km) southeast of Montreuil-sur-Mer, on the D110 and D98 crossroads and 5miles (8k) southeast of Hesdin in the heart of the ‘7 vallées’ countryside. A small stream, the Riviérette, a tributary of the Canche flows through the village.

== Population ==
Historical population
Year	Pop.	±% p.a.
1968	240	—
1975	228	−0.73%
1982	217	−0.70%
1990	200	−1.01%
1999	155	−2.79%
2007	174	+1.46%
2012	179	+0.57%
2017	188	+0.99%
2023	183	−0.45%
Source: INSEE

== Places of interest ==
- The church of St. Sulpice, dating from the fifteenth century.
- The château, whose façades and roof, along with a dovecote, are listed as historic monuments.
- A seventeenth century manor house, the Manoir de Vallières.

== See also ==
- Communes of the Pas-de-Calais department
