= Mouriez =

- Commune
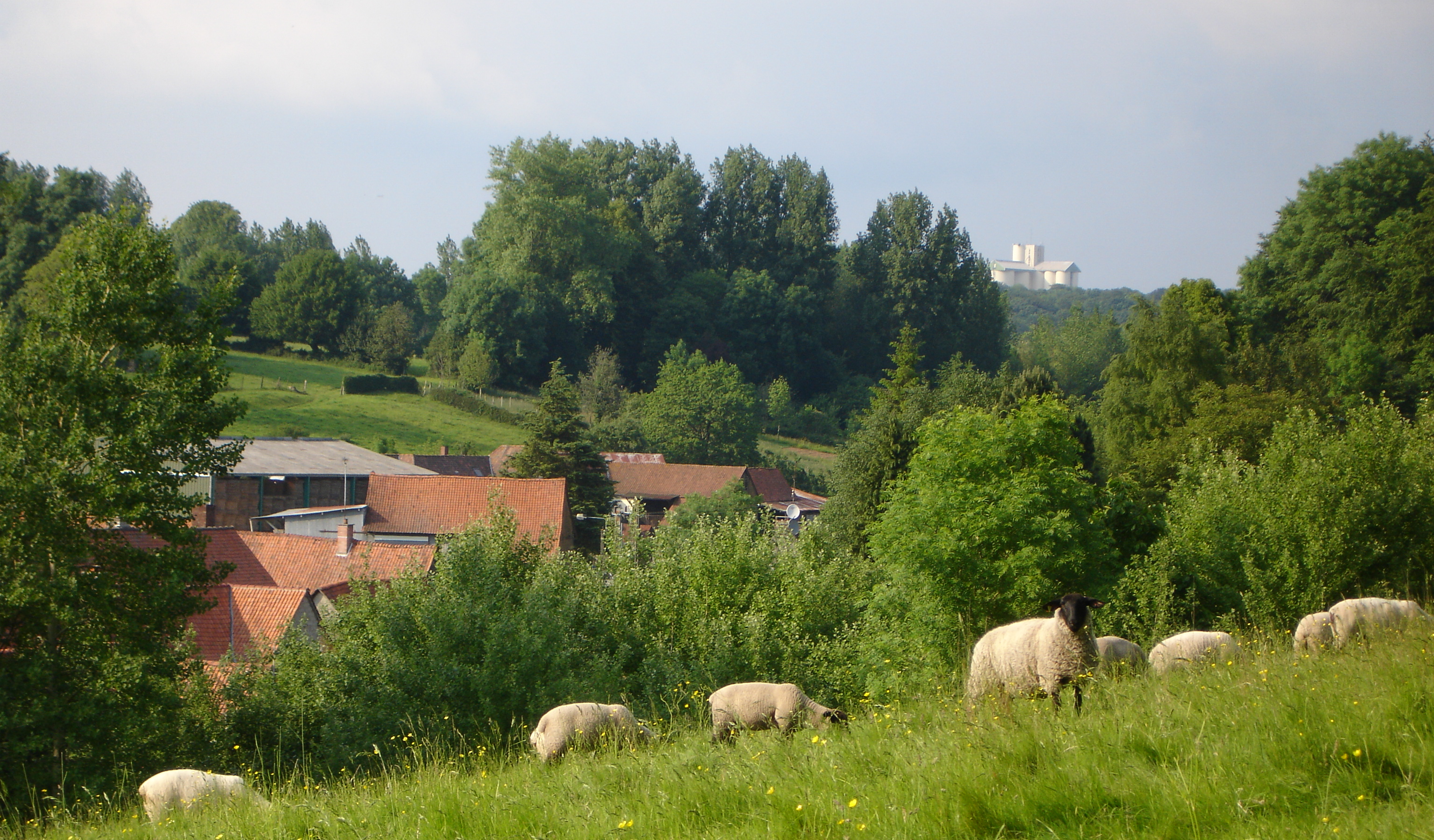
- The centre of the main village

- Coat of arms
- Location of Mouriez
- Location within France Location within Hauts-de-France
- Coordinates: 50°20′25″N 1°56′46″E
- Country: France
- Region: Hauts-de-France
- Department: Pas-de-Calais
- Arrondissement: Montreuil
- Canton: Auxi-le-Château
- Intercommunality: CC des 7 Vallées

Government
  - Mayor (2020–2026): Christophe Dedours
- Area^{1}: 15.72 km^{2} (6.07 sq mi)
- Elevation: 75 m (246 ft)
- Highest elevation: 127 m (417 ft)
- Lowest elevation: 30 m (98 ft)
- Population (2023): 237
  - Density: 15.1/km^{2} (39.0/sq mi)
- Time zone: UTC+01:00 (CET)
  - Summer (DST): UTC+02:00 (CEST)
- INSEE/Postal code: 62596 /62140
- ^{1} French Land Register data, which excludes lakes, ponds, glaciers > 1 km^{2} (0.386 sq mi or 247 acres) and river estuaries.

Mouriez (French pronunciation: [muʁje]) is a commune in the Pas-de-Calais department in the Hauts-de-France region of France. in the south of the department, with a surface area of 1,572 hectares between the Canche and Authie valleys, in the southern foothills of the Artois hills. Mouriez is 12 miles (19 km) southeast of Montreuil-sur-Mer.

The village is located at the bottom of a dry valley with a depth varying from 40 to 60 meters and incising an interfluvial plateau.

In addition to the village, the village is composed of three hamlets, two of which are located on the surrounding plateau: Bamières (to the east), and Lambus (to the north) near the national road 39 (RN 39). The hamlet of Rachinette (to the southeast) is nestled in the bottom of the vaux Roux and the Goulaffre.

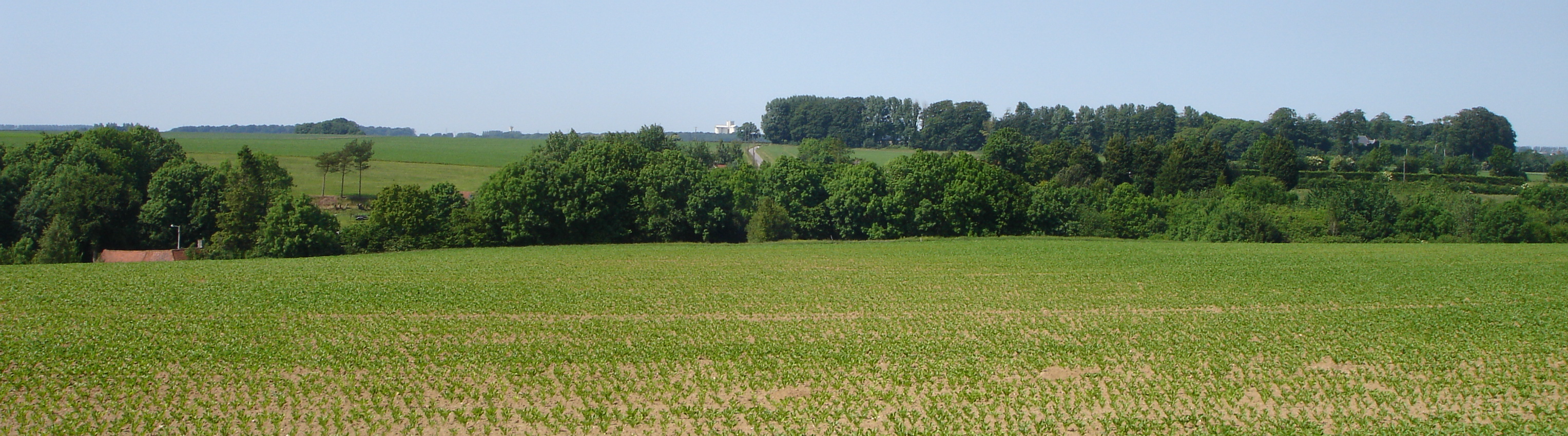
Plateau of Mouriez – Canche-Authie interfluve – towards the hamlet of Lambus (background) and the "Petit Lambus" lieu-dit below.

Boundary and cartographic representations of the municipality

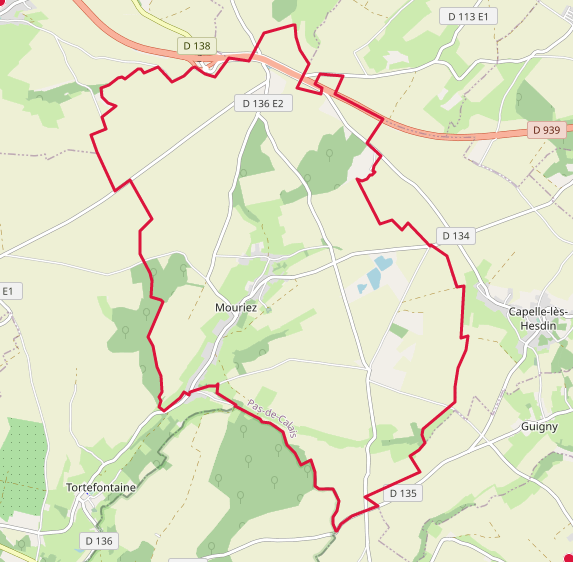
OpenStreetMap Map

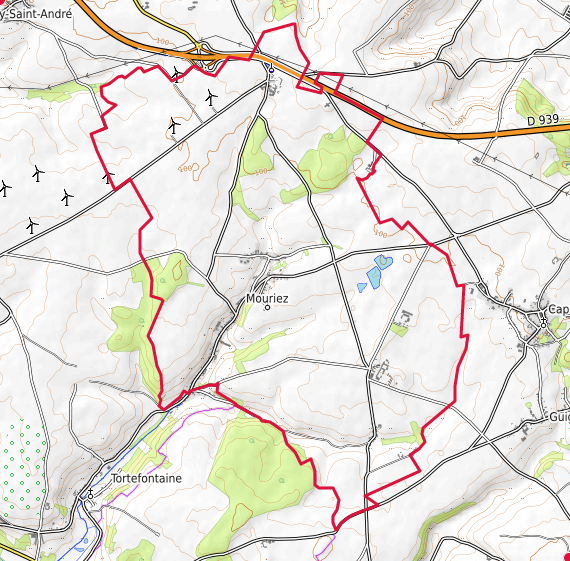
Topographic Map

== Population ==
Historical population
Year	Pop.	±% p.a.
1968	379	—
1975	321	−2.34%
1982	313	−0.36%
1990	287	−1.08%
1999	241	−1.92%
2007	246	+0.26%
2012	247	+0.08%
2017	249	+0.16%
2023	237	−0.82%
Source: INSEE

== See also ==
- Communes of the Pas-de-Calais department
