= Guisy =

Commune in Hauts-de-France, France

- Commune
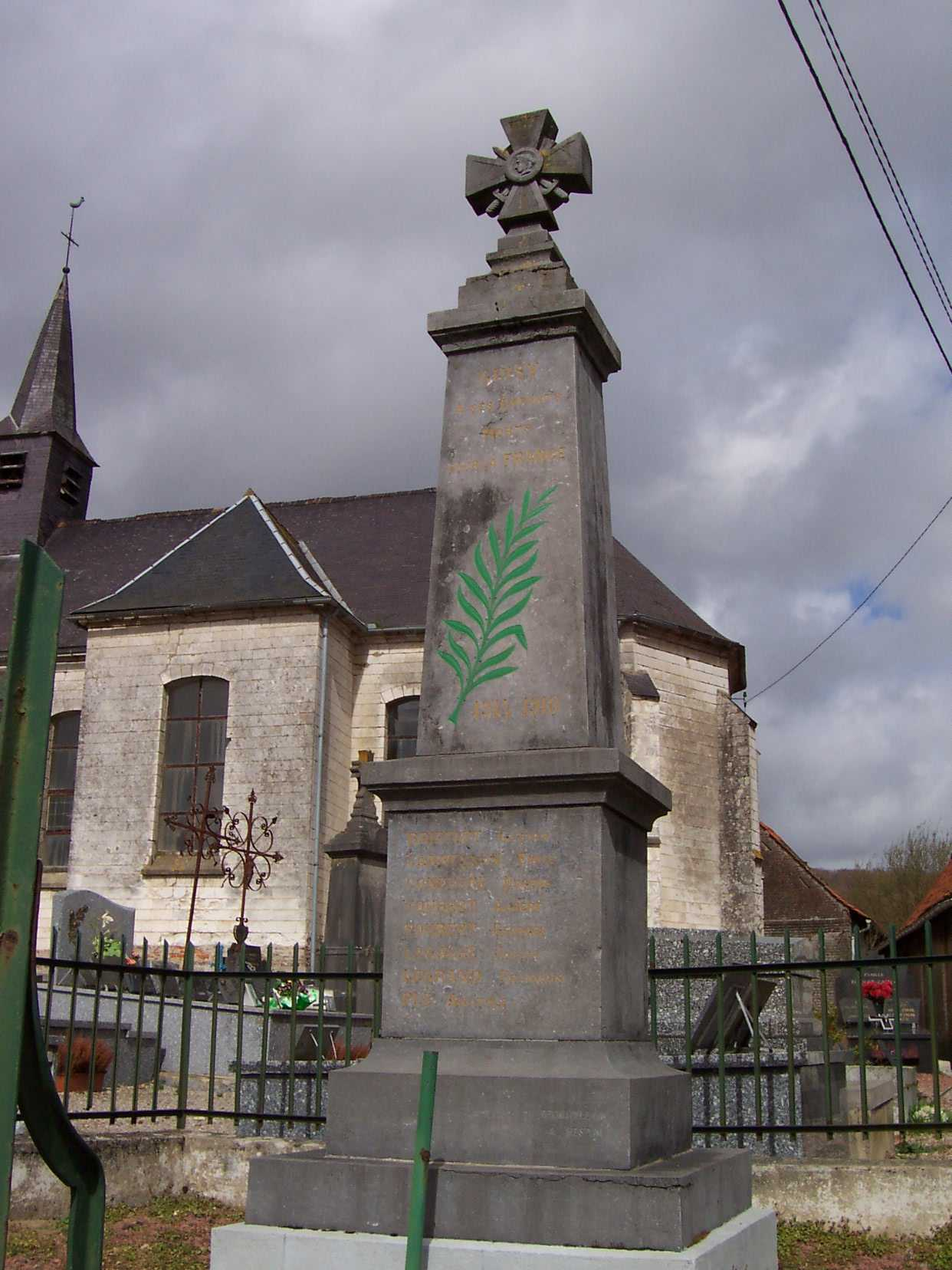
- War memorial at Guisy church

- Coat of arms
- Location of Guisy
- Location within France Location within Hauts-de-France
- Coordinates: 50°23′22″N 2°00′10″E
- Country: France
- Region: Hauts-de-France
- Department: Pas-de-Calais
- Arrondissement: Montreuil
- Canton: Auxi-le-Château
- Intercommunality: CC des 7 Vallées

Government
  - Mayor (2020–2026): Claude Colliez
- Area^{1}: 1.16 km^{2} (0.45 sq mi)
- Elevation: 20 m (66 ft)
- Highest elevation: 80 m (260 ft)
- Lowest elevation: 20 m (66 ft)
- Population (2023): 275
  - Density: 237/km^{2} (614/sq mi)
- Time zone: UTC+01:00 (CET)
  - Summer (DST): UTC+02:00 (CEST)
- INSEE/Postal code: 62398 /62140
- ^{1} French Land Register data, which excludes lakes, ponds, glaciers > 1 km^{2} (0.386 sq mi or 247 acres) and river estuaries.

Guisy (French pronunciation: [ɡizi]) is a commune in the Pas-de-Calais département in the Hauts-de-France region of France.

== Geography ==
A village situated some 10 miles (16 km) southeast of Montreuil-sur-Mer on the D113 road.

== Population ==
Historical population
| Year | Pop. | ±% p.a. |
|---|---|---|
| 1968 | 108 | — |
| 1975 | 154 | +5.20% |
| 1982 | 170 | +1.42% |
| 1990 | 218 | +3.16% |
| 1999 | 272 | +2.49% |
| 2007 | 305 | +1.44% |
| 2012 | 281 | −1.63% |
| 2017 | 270 | −0.80% |
| 2023 | 275 | +0.31% |
Source: INSEE

== Places of interest ==
Legend has it that during his two-year exile in France, Saint Thomas of Canterbury stayed in the commune.

The church of Saint Thomas of Canterbury dates from the eighteenth century. Its bell dates from 1679 and has been classified since 1908 as an objet historique by the Ministry of Culture. A 16th-century wooden statue of Saint Thomas was similarly classified in 1911 A painted wooden sculpture of Saint Joseph and the infant Jesus and an early-18th-century chalice are also listed by the Ministry of Culture.

In March 1974, the church was the victim of a major theft, with some of the stolen objects eventually being found in Belgium. In April 2015 plans were put forward for a €29,000 restoration of the church, including reinforcement of the framework of the belfry, its waterproofing and roof repairs. Repairs to the nave were also planned.

== See also ==
- Communes of the Pas-de-Calais department
