= Caumont, Pas-de-Calais =

Caumont
- Commune
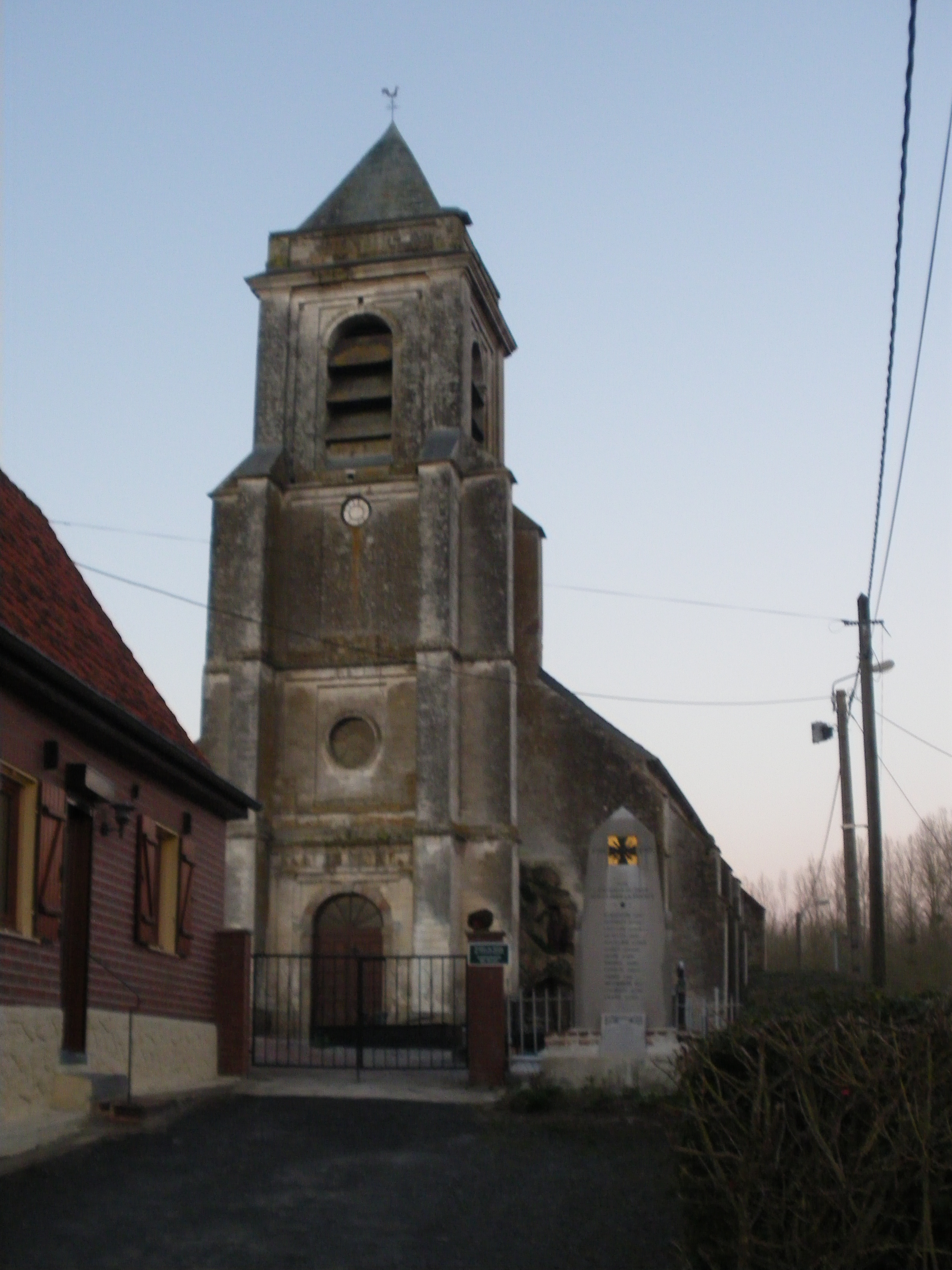
- The church of Caumont

- Coat of arms
- Location of Caumont
- Location within France Location within Hauts-de-France
- Coordinates: 50°20′32″N 1°59′52″E
- Country: France
- Region: Hauts-de-France
- Department: Pas-de-Calais
- Arrondissement: Montreuil
- Canton: Auxi-le-Château
- Intercommunality: CC des 7 Vallées

Government
  - Mayor (2020–2026): Éric Revillion
- Area^{1}: 9.44 km^{2} (3.64 sq mi)
- Highest elevation: 130 m (430 ft)
- Lowest elevation: 25 m (82 ft)
- Population (2023): 150
  - Density: 16/km^{2} (41/sq mi)
- Time zone: UTC+01:00 (CET)
  - Summer (DST): UTC+02:00 (CEST)
- INSEE/Postal code: 62219 /62140
- ^{1} French Land Register data, which excludes lakes, ponds, glaciers > 1 km^{2} (0.386 sq mi or 247 acres) and river estuaries.

Caumont (French pronunciation: [komɔ̃]) is a commune in the Pas-de-Calais department in the Hauts-de-France region of France. It is situated some 20 miles (32 km) southeast of Montreuil-sur-Mer on the D101 road.

== Population ==
Historical population
Year	Pop.	±% p.a.
1968	328	—
1975	290	−1.74%
1982	224	−3.62%
1990	200	−1.41%
1999	206	+0.33%
2007	188	−1.14%
2012	183	−0.54%
2017	162	−2.41%
2023	150	−1.27%
Source: INSEE

== See also ==
- Communes of the Pas-de-Calais department
