= Marconnelle =

- Commune
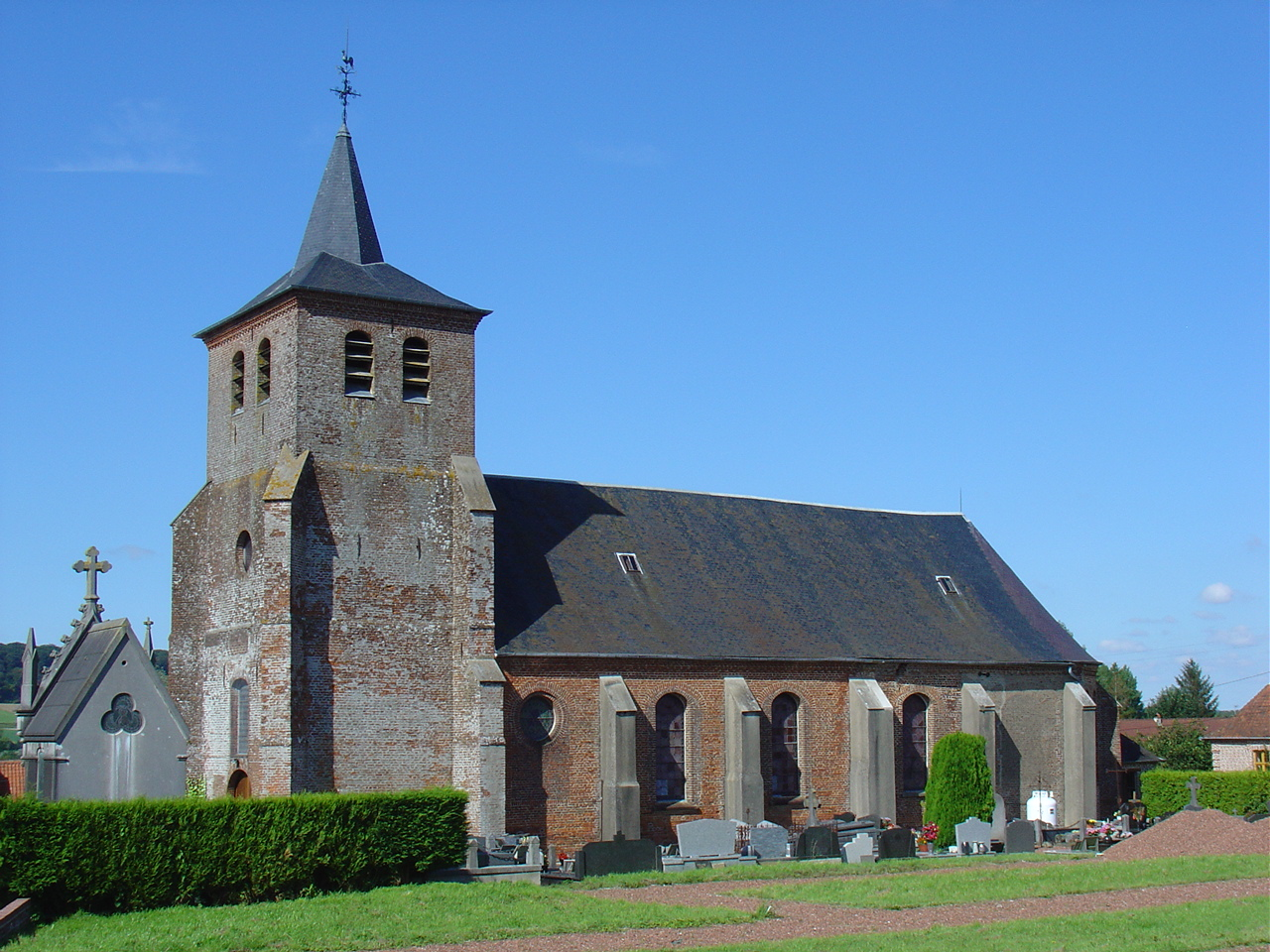
- The church of Marconnelle

- Coat of arms
- Location of Marconnelle
- Location within France Location within Hauts-de-France
- Coordinates: 50°22′30″N 2°02′15″E
- Country: France
- Region: Hauts-de-France
- Department: Pas-de-Calais
- Arrondissement: Montreuil
- Canton: Auxi-le-Château
- Intercommunality: CC des 7 Vallées

Government
  - Mayor (2020–2026): Claude Bacquet
- Area^{1}: 5.55 km^{2} (2.14 sq mi)
- Elevation: 81 m (266 ft)
- Highest elevation: 133 m (436 ft)
- Lowest elevation: 22 m (72 ft)
- Population (2023): 1,090
  - Density: 196/km^{2} (509/sq mi)
- Time zone: UTC+01:00 (CET)
  - Summer (DST): UTC+02:00 (CEST)
- INSEE/Postal code: 62550 /62140
- ^{1} French Land Register data, which excludes lakes, ponds, glaciers > 1 km^{2} (0.386 sq mi or 247 acres) and river estuaries.

Marconnelle (French pronunciation: [maʁkɔnɛl]) is a commune in the Pas-de-Calais department in the Hauts-de-France region of France, a suburb of Hesdin 13 miles (21 km) southeast of Montreuil-sur-Mer.

== Population ==
Historical population
Year	Pop.	±% p.a.
1968	986	—
1975	1,239	+3.32%
1982	1,489	+2.66%
1990	1,334	−1.36%
1999	1,312	−0.18%
2007	1,249	−0.61%
2012	1,181	−1.11%
2017	1,134	−0.81%
2023	1,090	−0.66%
Source: INSEE

== See also ==
- Communes of the Pas-de-Calais department
