= Beauvoir-Wavans =

- Commune
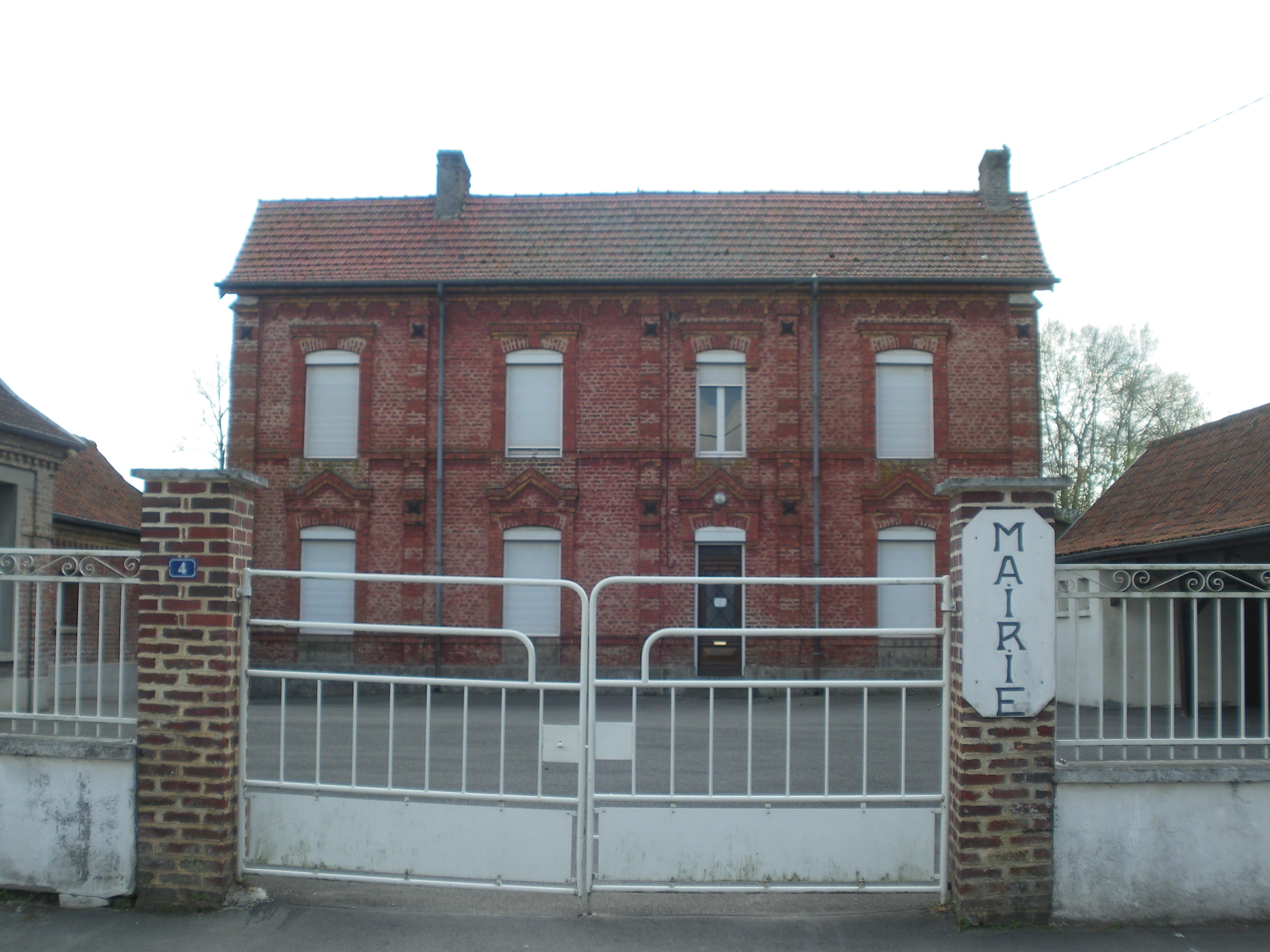
- The town hall of Beauvoir-Wavans

- Coat of arms
- Location of Beauvoir-Wavans
- Location within France Location within Hauts-de-France
- Coordinates: 50°13′07″N 2°09′47″E
- Country: France
- Region: Hauts-de-France
- Department: Pas-de-Calais
- Arrondissement: Arras
- Canton: Auxi-le-Château
- Intercommunality: CC du Ternois

Government
  - Mayor (2023–2026): Marc Fourdrinier
- Area^{1}: 9.49 km^{2} (3.66 sq mi)
- Elevation: 48 m (157 ft)
- Highest elevation: 128 m (420 ft)
- Lowest elevation: 32 m (105 ft)
- Population (2023): 355
  - Density: 37.4/km^{2} (96.9/sq mi)
- Time zone: UTC+01:00 (CET)
  - Summer (DST): UTC+02:00 (CEST)
- INSEE/Postal code: 62881 /62390
- ^{1} French Land Register data, which excludes lakes, ponds, glaciers > 1 km^{2} (0.386 sq mi or 247 acres) and river estuaries.

Beauvoir-Wavans is a commune in the Pas-de-Calais department in the Hauts-de-France region in northern France. It was formed in 1973 by the merger of the former communes Wavans-sur-l'Authie and Beauvoir-Rivière (previously in the Somme department).

== Geography ==
A village located 33 miles (52 km) southwest of Arras at the junction of the D117 with the D938 road.

== Population ==
Historical population
Year	Pop.	±% p.a.
1968	396	—
1975	392	−0.14%
1982	401	+0.32%
1990	409	+0.25%
1999	397	−0.33%
2007	390	−0.22%
2012	392	+0.10%
2017	380	−0.62%
2023	355	−1.13%
Source: INSEE

== Sights ==
- Two churches dedicated to St. Vaast, from the sixteenth century and the 17th century.
- The Château de Beauvoir-Rivière, built in 1780.
- The World War I cemetery.

== See also ==
- Communes of the Pas-de-Calais department
