= Nœux-lès-Auxi =

- Commune
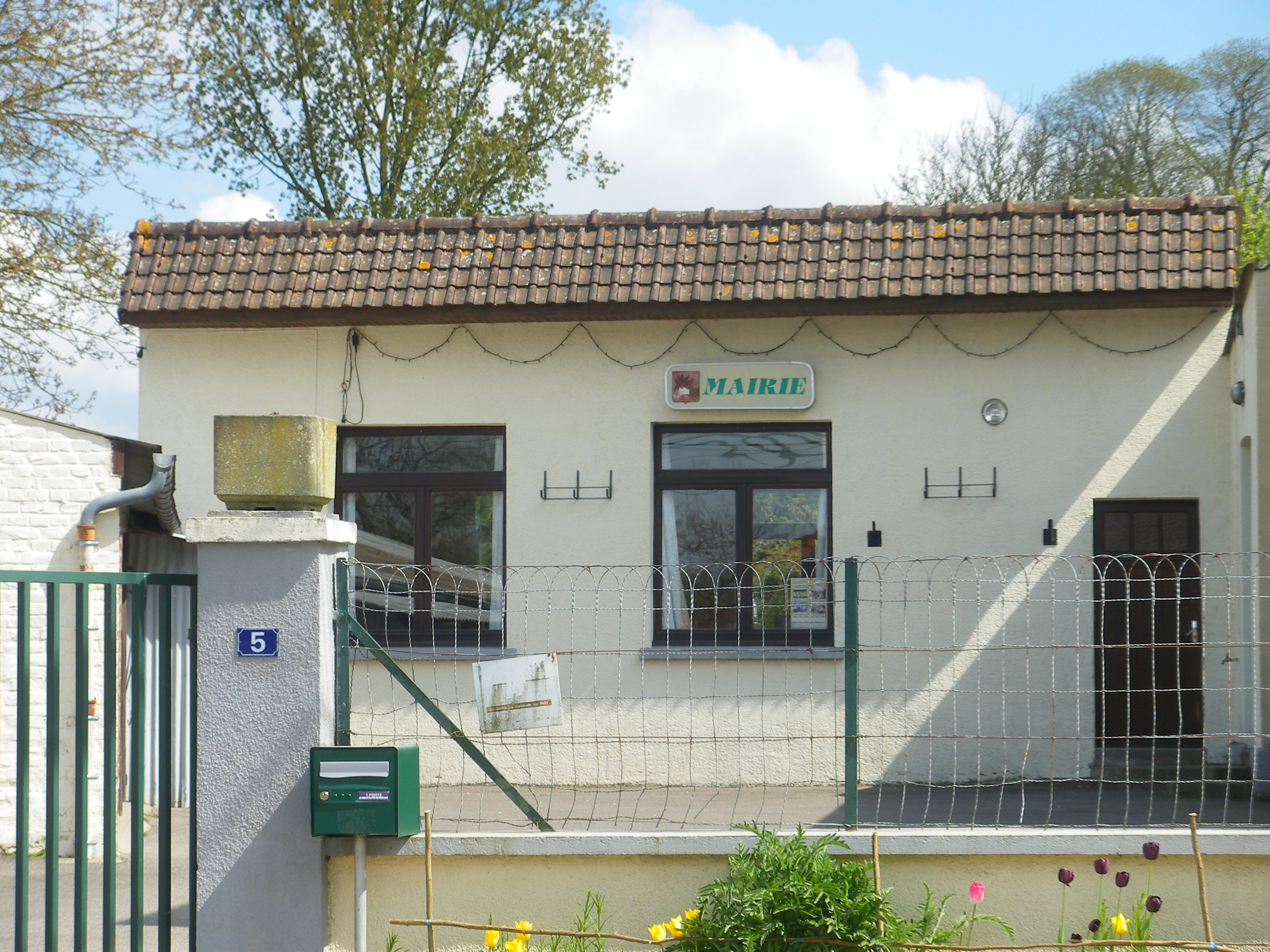
- The town hall of Nœux-lès-Auxi

- Coat of arms
- Location of Nœux-lès-Auxi
- Location within France Location within Hauts-de-France
- Coordinates: 50°14′11″N 2°10′31″E
- Country: France
- Region: Hauts-de-France
- Department: Pas-de-Calais
- Arrondissement: Arras
- Canton: Auxi-le-Château
- Intercommunality: CC Ternois

Government
  - Mayor (2020–2026): Daniel Melin
- Area^{1}: 6.26 km^{2} (2.42 sq mi)
- Elevation: 51 m (167 ft)
- Highest elevation: 140 m (460 ft)
- Lowest elevation: 42 m (138 ft)
- Population (2023): 186
  - Density: 29.7/km^{2} (77.0/sq mi)
- Time zone: UTC+01:00 (CET)
  - Summer (DST): UTC+02:00 (CEST)
- INSEE/Postal code: 62616 /62390
- ^{1} French Land Register data, which excludes lakes, ponds, glaciers > 1 km^{2} (0.386 sq mi or 247 acres) and river estuaries.

Nœux-lès-Auxi (French pronunciation: [nø lɛz‿oksi], literally Nœux near Auxi) is a commune in the Pas-de-Calais department in the Hauts-de-France region of France.

== Geography ==
Nœux-lès-Auxi is situated 31 miles (50 km) west of Arras, at the junction of the D17 and D117 roads.

== Population ==
Historical population
Year	Pop.	±% p.a.
1968	205	—
1975	160	−3.48%
1982	172	+1.04%
1990	186	+0.98%
1999	204	+1.03%
2007	168	−2.40%
2012	170	+0.24%
2017	179	+1.04%
2023	186	+0.64%
Source: INSEE

== Places of interest ==
- The seventeenth century church of St. Martin,
- A chateau, rebuilt in the 19th century.
- The miller's house, dating from the eighteenth century.

== See also ==
- Communes of the Pas-de-Calais department
