= Tollent =

- Commune
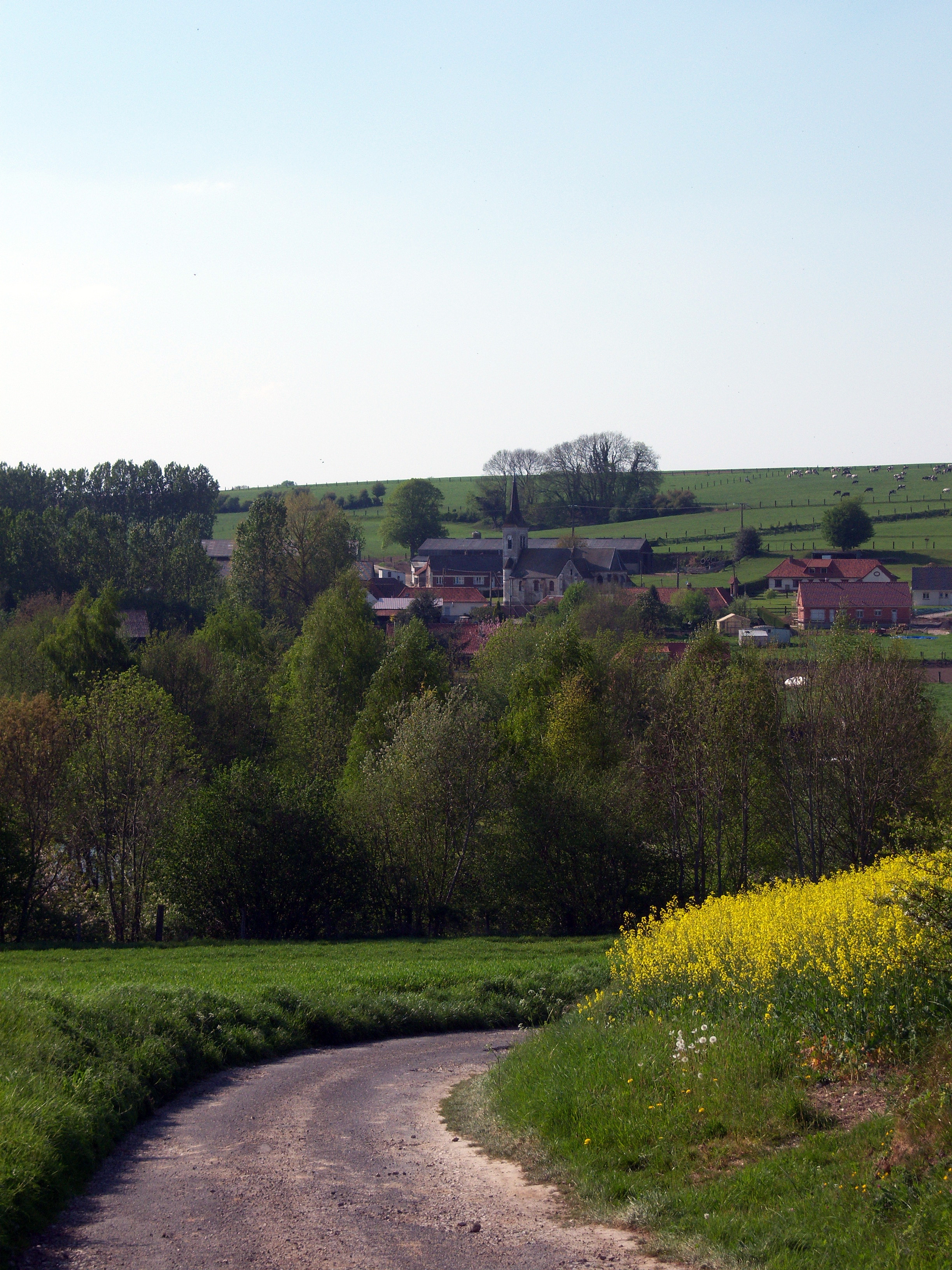
- A general view of Tollent

- Coat of arms
- Location of Tollent
- Location within France Location within Hauts-de-France
- Coordinates: 50°16′40″N 2°00′53″E
- Country: France
- Region: Hauts-de-France
- Department: Pas-de-Calais
- Arrondissement: Arras
- Canton: Auxi-le-Château
- Intercommunality: CC Ternois

Government
  - Mayor (2020–2026): Regis Bezu
- Area^{1}: 4.31 km^{2} (1.66 sq mi)
- Elevation: 34 m (112 ft)
- Highest elevation: 108 m (354 ft)
- Lowest elevation: 17 m (56 ft)
- Population (2023): 81
  - Density: 19/km^{2} (49/sq mi)
- Time zone: UTC+01:00 (CET)
  - Summer (DST): UTC+02:00 (CEST)
- INSEE/Postal code: 62822 /62390
- ^{1} French Land Register data, which excludes lakes, ponds, glaciers > 1 km^{2} (0.386 sq mi or 247 acres) and river estuaries.

Tollent (French pronunciation: [tɔlɑ̃]) is a commune in the Pas-de-Calais department in the Hauts-de-France region of France on the banks of the river Authie, 36 miles (58 km) west of Arras.

== Population ==
Historical population
Year	Pop.	±% p.a.
1968	148	—
1975	118	−3.18%
1982	86	−4.42%
1990	82	−0.59%
1999	77	−0.70%
2007	88	+1.68%
2012	92	+0.89%
2017	91	−0.22%
2023	81	−1.92%
Source: INSEE

== See also ==
- Communes of the Pas-de-Calais department
