= Villers-l'Hôpital =

Villers-l’Hôpital
- Commune
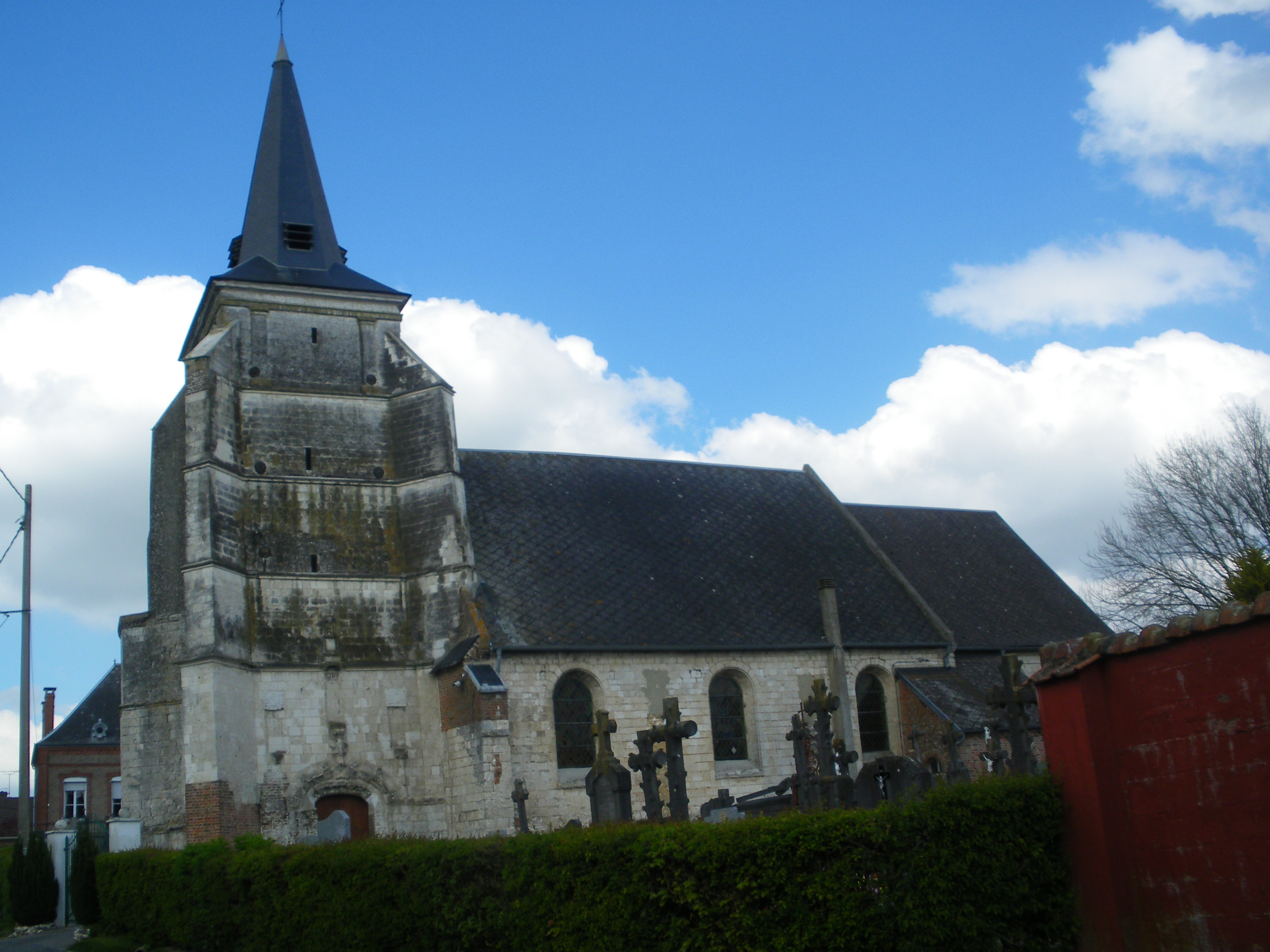
- The church of Villers-l'Hôpital
- Location of Villers-l’Hôpital
- Location within France Location within Hauts-de-France
- Coordinates: 50°13′43″N 2°12′50″E
- Country: France
- Region: Hauts-de-France
- Department: Pas-de-Calais
- Arrondissement: Arras
- Canton: Auxi-le-Château
- Intercommunality: CC Ternois

Government
  - Mayor (2020–2026): Dominique Rimbault
- Area^{1}: 8.4 km^{2} (3.2 sq mi)
- Elevation: 126 m (413 ft)
- Highest elevation: 146 m (479 ft)
- Lowest elevation: 63 m (207 ft)
- Population (2023): 255
  - Density: 30/km^{2} (79/sq mi)
- Time zone: UTC+01:00 (CET)
  - Summer (DST): UTC+02:00 (CEST)
- INSEE/Postal code: 62859 /62390
- ^{1} French Land Register data, which excludes lakes, ponds, glaciers > 1 km^{2} (0.386 sq mi or 247 acres) and river estuaries.

Villers-l’Hôpital (French pronunciation: [vilɛʁ lopital]) is a commune in the Pas-de-Calais department in the Hauts-de-France region of France.

== Geography ==
Villers-l'Hôpital is situated some 26 miles (42 km) southwest of Arras, at the junction of the D114 and D116 roads.

== Population ==
Historical population
Year	Pop.	±% p.a.
1968	267	—
1975	228	−2.23%
1982	279	+2.93%
1990	242	−1.76%
1999	266	+1.06%
2007	270	+0.19%
2012	263	−0.52%
2017	265	+0.15%
2023	255	−0.64%
Source: INSEE

== Places of interest ==
- The church of St.John, dating from the fifteenth century.

== See also ==
- Communes of the Pas-de-Calais department
