= Gennes-Ivergny =

- Commune
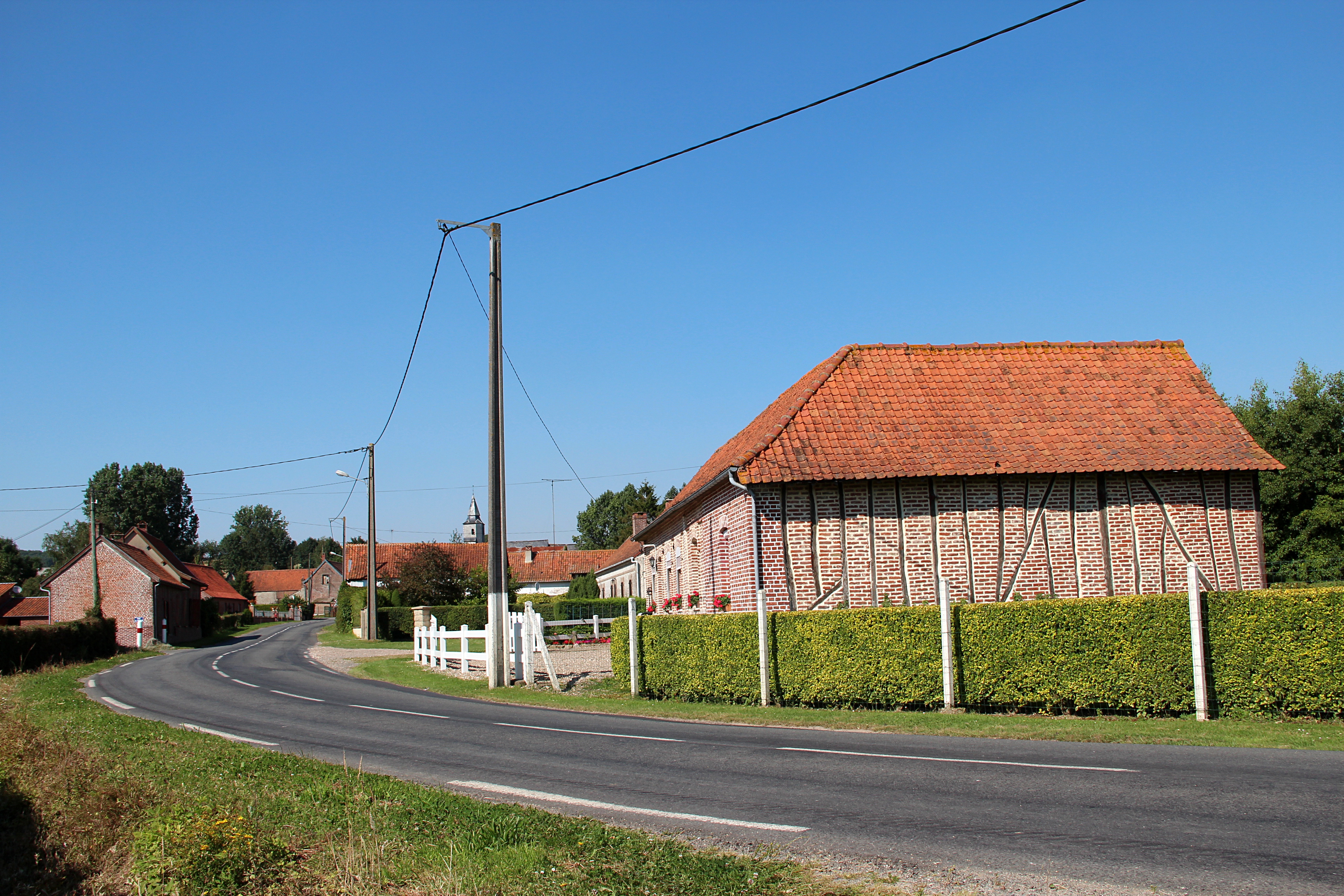
- A view within Gennes-Ivergny

- Coat of arms
- Location of Gennes-Ivergny
- Location within France Location within Hauts-de-France
- Coordinates: 50°15′50″N 2°02′52″E
- Country: France
- Region: Hauts-de-France
- Department: Pas-de-Calais
- Arrondissement: Arras
- Canton: Auxi-le-Château
- Intercommunality: CC Ternois

Government
  - Mayor (2020–2026): Bernard Henno
- Area^{1}: 10.98 km^{2} (4.24 sq mi)
- Elevation: 91 m (299 ft)
- Highest elevation: 132 m (433 ft)
- Lowest elevation: 22 m (72 ft)
- Population (2023): 122
  - Density: 11.1/km^{2} (28.8/sq mi)
- Time zone: UTC+01:00 (CET)
  - Summer (DST): UTC+02:00 (CEST)
- INSEE/Postal code: 62370 /62390
- ^{1} French Land Register data, which excludes lakes, ponds, glaciers > 1 km^{2} (0.386 sq mi or 247 acres) and river estuaries.

Gennes-Ivergny (French pronunciation: [ʒɛn ivɛʁɲi]; Picard: Gennes-Ivérgny) is a commune in the Pas-de-Calais department in the Hauts-de-France region of France.

== Geography ==
A small farming village situated on the north bank of the river Authie, the border with the Somme department, 32 miles (51 km) west of Arras, at the junction of the D115 and the D124 roads.

== Population ==
Historical population
Year	Pop.	±% p.a.
1968	179	—
1975	177	−0.16%
1982	162	−1.26%
1990	161	−0.08%
1999	141	−1.46%
2007	125	−1.49%
2012	127	+0.32%
2017	128	+0.16%
2023	122	−0.80%
Source: INSEE

== Places of interest ==
- The church of St.Louis, dating from the seventeenth century.
- The Commonwealth War Graves Commission cemetery.
- A sixteenth century manor house with a 5-sided tower.

The Manor of Gennes-Ivergny, also known as the Templar Manor,

The Manor of Gennes-Ivergny appears in records since 1294. It defends a ford on the River Authie. It became a strategic location during various conflicts from the 13th century to the present day, notably the Hundred Years' War against England. The owner at the time, Lord David d'Auxy, chamberlain to King Charles VI of France, died at Agincourt in 1415. The Spanish period, from 1556 to 1659, marked the border between the two powers, and its walls were marked by gunfire. At its height, in the 14th and 15th centuries, it featured two towers and drawbridges over a branch of the Authie River, serving as a moat. The largest tower was later demolished, the moat filled in, and the north wing was built in 1720. The building became a large farm. Listed as a historic monument in 1976, it has been completely renovated, restoring as many of its medieval features as possible. Today, it is a private family home.

Isabelle Turpin thesis 1994 and research done by Paul Majerus 2015

== See also ==
- Communes of the Pas-de-Calais department
