= La Loge, Pas-de-Calais =

La Loge
- Commune
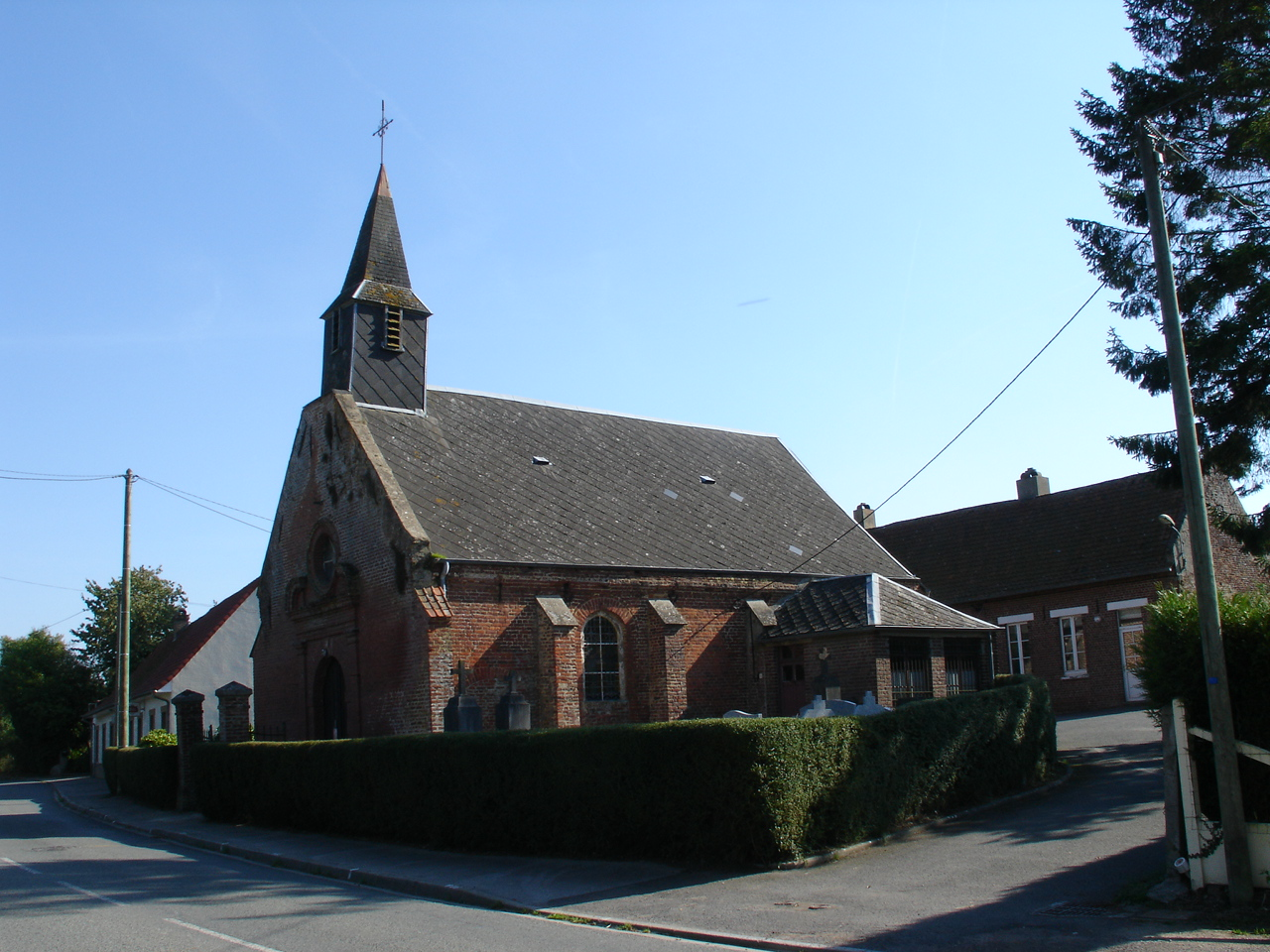
- The church of La Loge

- Coat of arms
- Location of La Loge
- Location within France Location within Hauts-de-France
- Coordinates: 50°24′28″N 2°02′03″E
- Country: France
- Region: Hauts-de-France
- Department: Pas-de-Calais
- Arrondissement: Montreuil
- Canton: Auxi-le-Château
- Intercommunality: CC des 7 Vallées

Government
  - Mayor (2020–2026): Joël Allexandre
- Area^{1}: 0.6 km^{2} (0.23 sq mi)
- Elevation: 108 m (354 ft)
- Highest elevation: 116 m (381 ft)
- Lowest elevation: 100 m (330 ft)
- Population (2023): 224
  - Density: 370/km^{2} (970/sq mi)
- Time zone: UTC+01:00 (CET)
  - Summer (DST): UTC+02:00 (CEST)
- INSEE/Postal code: 62521 /62140
- ^{1} French Land Register data, which excludes lakes, ponds, glaciers > 1 km^{2} (0.386 sq mi or 247 acres) and river estuaries.

La Loge (French pronunciation: [la lɔʒ]) is a commune in the Pas-de-Calais department in the Hauts-de-France region of France about 12 miles (19 km) southeast of Montreuil-sur-Mer at the edge of the forest of Hesdin.

== Population ==
Historical population
| Year | Pop. | ±% p.a. |
|---|---|---|
| 1968 | 171 | — |
| 1975 | 169 | −0.17% |
| 1982 | 159 | −0.87% |
| 1990 | 181 | +1.63% |
| 1999 | 185 | +0.24% |
| 2007 | 191 | +0.40% |
| 2012 | 188 | −0.32% |
| 2017 | 201 | +1.35% |
| 2023 | 224 | +1.82% |
Source: INSEE

== See also ==
- Communes of the Pas-de-Calais department
