= Willencourt =

- Commune
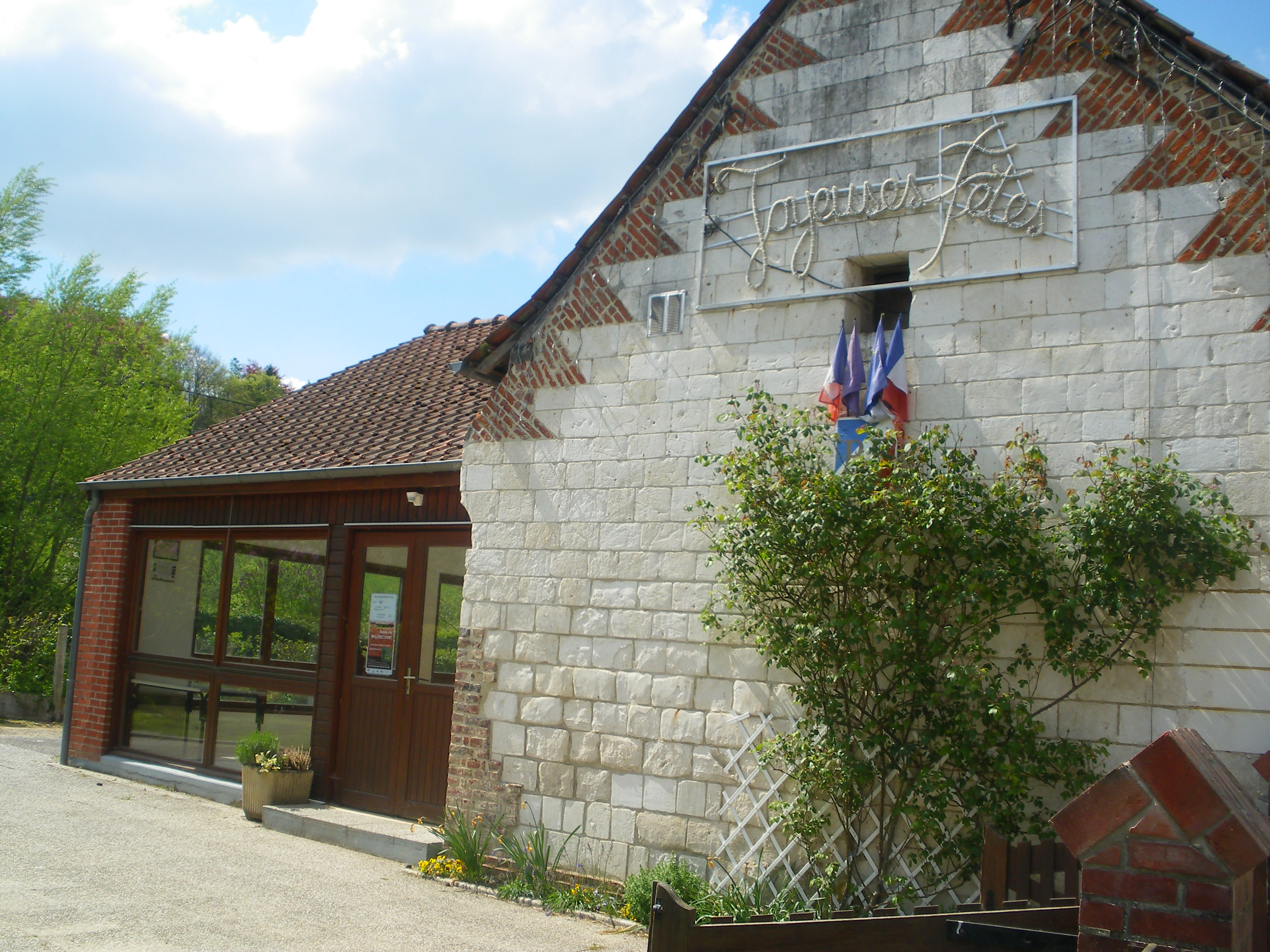
- The town hall of Willencourt

- Coat of arms
- Location of Willencourt
- Location within France Location within Hauts-de-France
- Coordinates: 50°14′28″N 2°05′24″E
- Country: France
- Region: Hauts-de-France
- Department: Pas-de-Calais
- Arrondissement: Arras
- Canton: Auxi-le-Château
- Intercommunality: Ternois

Government
  - Mayor (2020–2026): Yves Hostyn
- Area^{1}: 2.45 km^{2} (0.95 sq mi)
- Elevation: 27 m (89 ft)
- Highest elevation: 97 m (318 ft)
- Lowest elevation: 25 m (82 ft)
- Population (2023): 138
  - Density: 56.3/km^{2} (146/sq mi)
- Time zone: UTC+01:00 (CET)
  - Summer (DST): UTC+02:00 (CEST)
- INSEE/Postal code: 62891 /62390
- ^{1} French Land Register data, which excludes lakes, ponds, glaciers > 1 km^{2} (0.386 sq mi or 247 acres) and river estuaries.

Willencourt is a commune in the Pas-de-Calais department in the Hauts-de-France region of France.

== Geography ==
Willencourt is situated some 33 miles (53 km) west of Arras, at the junction of the D118 and the D118E roads, on the banks of the river Authie, the border with the department of the Somme.

== Population ==
Historical population
Year	Pop.	±% p.a.
1968	86	—
1975	129	+5.96%
1982	126	−0.34%
1990	140	+1.33%
1999	136	−0.32%
2007	146	+0.89%
2012	142	−0.55%
2017	134	−1.15%
2023	138	+0.49%
Source: INSEE

== Places of interest ==
- The church of St. Maurice, dating from the nineteenth century.
- A nineteenth century chateau.

== See also ==
- Communes of the Pas-de-Calais department
