= Fontaine-l'Étalon =

- Commune
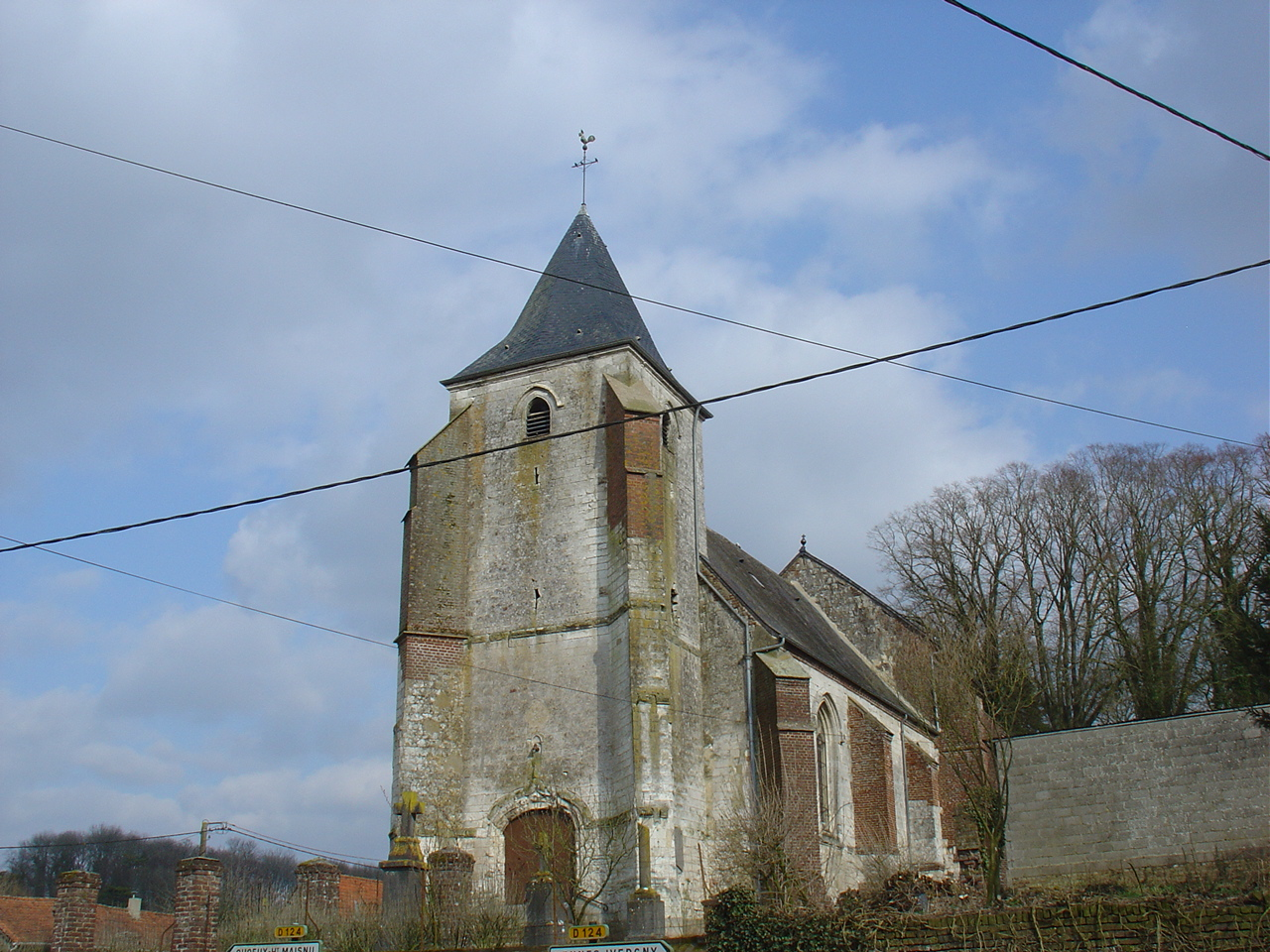
- The church of Fontaine l'Étalon

- Coat of arms
- Location of Fontaine-l'Étalon
- Location within France Location within Hauts-de-France
- Coordinates: 50°18′21″N 2°03′54″E
- Country: France
- Region: Hauts-de-France
- Department: Pas-de-Calais
- Arrondissement: Arras
- Canton: Auxi-le-Château
- Intercommunality: CC Ternois

Government
  - Mayor (2020–2026): Alain Trannin
- Area^{1}: 3.98 km^{2} (1.54 sq mi)
- Elevation: 102 m (335 ft)
- Highest elevation: 132 m (433 ft)
- Lowest elevation: 54 m (177 ft)
- Population (2023): 92
  - Density: 23/km^{2} (60/sq mi)
- Time zone: UTC+01:00 (CET)
  - Summer (DST): UTC+02:00 (CEST)
- INSEE/Postal code: 62345 /62390
- ^{1} French Land Register data, which excludes lakes, ponds, glaciers > 1 km^{2} (0.386 sq mi or 247 acres) and river estuaries.

Fontaine-l'Étalon (French pronunciation: [fɔ̃tɛn letalɔ̃]; Picard: Fontainne-l'Étalon) is a commune in the Pas-de-Calais department in the Hauts-de-France region of France.

== Geography ==
A small farming village situated 31 miles (50 km) west of Arras, at the junction of the D101 and the D124 roads.

== Population ==
Historical population
Year	Pop.	±% p.a.
1968	160	—
1975	143	−1.59%
1982	124	−2.02%
1990	124	+0.00%
1999	112	−1.12%
2007	123	+1.18%
2012	123	+0.00%
2017	102	−3.68%
2023	92	−1.71%
Source: INSEE

== Places of interest ==
- The church of St. Fermin, dating from the sixteenth century.
- The Commonwealth War Graves Commission cemetery.
- Traces of an old chateau.
- An old mill.

== See also ==
- Communes of the Pas-de-Calais department
