= Vaulx, Pas-de-Calais =

Vaulx
- Commune
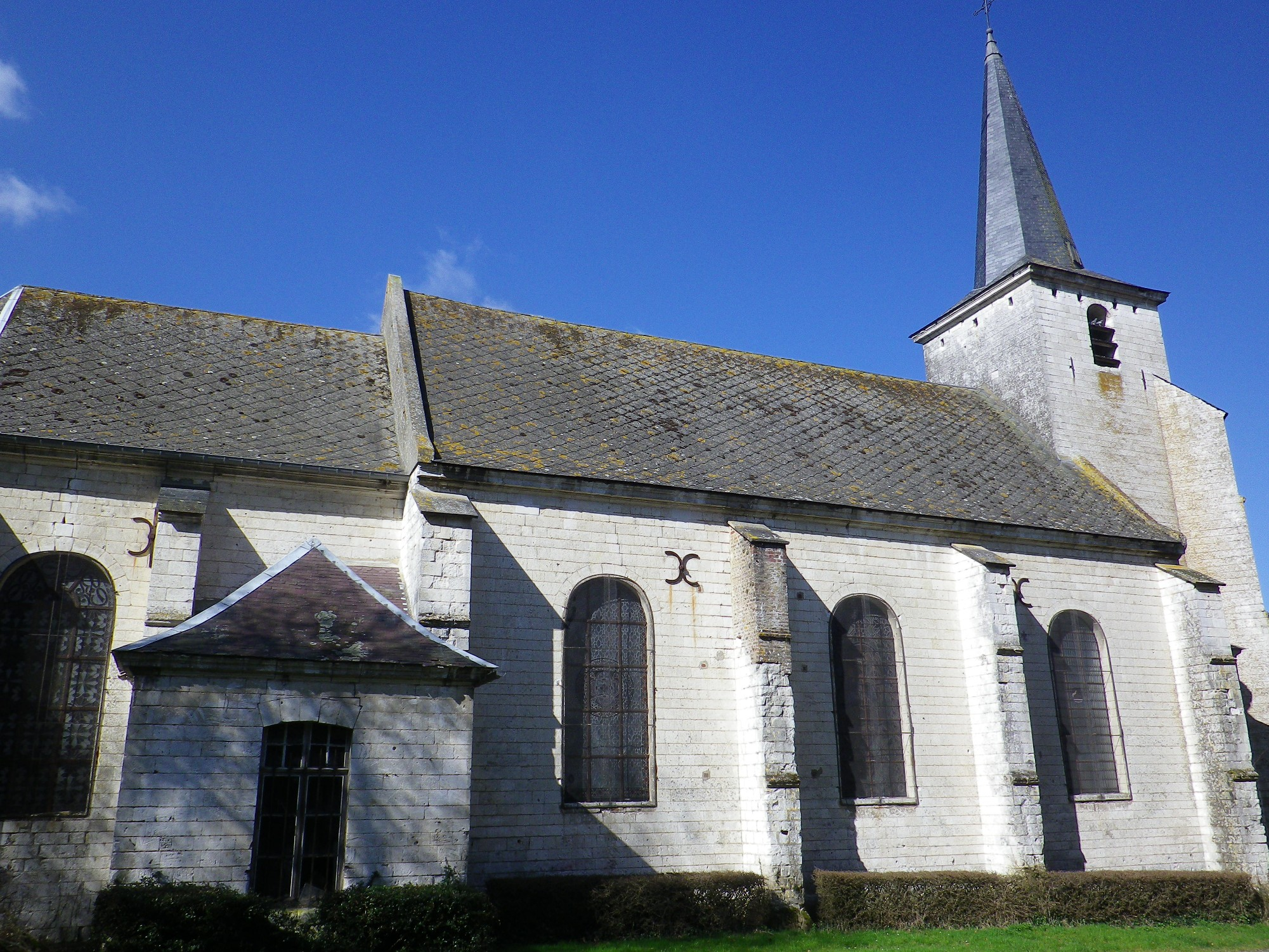
- The church of Vaulx
- Location of Vaulx
- Location within France Location within Hauts-de-France
- Coordinates: 50°16′06″N 2°05′52″E
- Country: France
- Region: Hauts-de-France
- Department: Pas-de-Calais
- Arrondissement: Arras
- Canton: Auxi-le-Château
- Intercommunality: CC Ternois

Government
  - Mayor (2020–2026): Claude Bruhier
- Area^{1}: 4.92 km^{2} (1.90 sq mi)
- Elevation: 93 m (305 ft)
- Highest elevation: 131 m (430 ft)
- Lowest elevation: 35 m (115 ft)
- Population (2023): 89
  - Density: 18/km^{2} (47/sq mi)
- Time zone: UTC+01:00 (CET)
  - Summer (DST): UTC+02:00 (CEST)
- INSEE/Postal code: 62838 /62390
- ^{1} French Land Register data, which excludes lakes, ponds, glaciers > 1 km^{2} (0.386 sq mi or 247 acres) and river estuaries.

Vaulx is a commune in the Pas-de-Calais department in the Hauts-de-France region of France 34 miles (55 km) west of Arras.

== Population ==
Historical population
Year	Pop.	±% p.a.
1968	129	—
1975	118	−1.27%
1982	103	−1.92%
1990	83	−2.66%
1999	83	+0.00%
2007	88	+0.73%
2012	91	+0.67%
2017	90	−0.22%
2023	89	−0.19%
Source: INSEE

== See also ==
- Communes of the Pas-de-Calais department
