= Canton of Auxi-le-Château =

Coordinates: 50°15′58″N 2°10′25″E

Auxi-le-Château
- Canton
- Location of Auxi-le-Château in the department
- Country: France
- Region: Hauts-de-France
- Department: Pas-de-Calais
- No. of communes: {{{nbcomm}}}
- Area: 613.15 km^{2} (236.74 sq mi)
- Population (2023): 34,234
  - Density: 55.833/km^{2} (144.61/sq mi)
- INSEE code: 62 06

The Canton of Auxi-le-Château is a canton situated in the department of the Pas-de-Calais and in the Hauts-de-France region of northern France.

== Composition ==
At the French canton reorganisation which came into effect in March 2015, the canton was expanded from 26 to 84 communes (4 of which merged into the new commune Hesdin-la-Forêt):

- Aix-en-Issart
- Aubin-Saint-Vaast
- Auchy-lès-Hesdin
- Auxi-le-Château
- Azincourt
- Béalencourt
- Beaurainville
- Beauvoir-Wavans
- Blangy-sur-Ternoise
- Blingel
- Boffles
- Boisjean
- Boubers-lès-Hesmond
- Bouin-Plumoison
- Brévillers
- Brimeux
- Buire-au-Bois
- Buire-le-Sec
- Campagne-lès-Hesdin
- Capelle-lès-Hesdin
- Caumont
- Cavron-Saint-Martin
- Chériennes
- Contes
- Douriez
- Éclimeux
- Fillièvres
- Fontaine-l'Étalon
- Fresnoy
- Galametz
- Gennes-Ivergny
- Gouy-Saint-André
- Grigny
- Guigny
- Guisy
- Haravesnes
- Hesdin-la-Forêt
- Hesmond
- Incourt
- Labroye
- Lespinoy
- La Loge
- Loison-sur-Créquoise
- Maintenay
- Maisoncelle
- Marant
- Marconnelle
- Marenla
- Maresquel-Ecquemicourt
- Marles-sur-Canche
- Mouriez
- Neulette
- Nœux-lès-Auxi
- Noyelles-lès-Humières
- Offin
- Le Parcq
- Le Ponchel
- Le Quesnoy-en-Artois
- Quœux-Haut-Maînil
- Raye-sur-Authie
- Regnauville
- Rollancourt
- Rougefay
- Roussent
- Saint-Denœux
- Saint-Georges
- Saint-Rémy-au-Bois
- Saulchoy
- Sempy
- Tollent
- Tortefontaine
- Tramecourt
- Vacqueriette-Erquières
- Vaulx
- Vieil-Hesdin
- Villers-l'Hôpital
- Wail
- Wambercourt
- Wamin
- Willeman
- Willencourt

== Population ==
Historical population
Year	Pop.	±% p.a.
2013	34,709	—
2018	34,500	−0.12%
Source: INSEE

== See also ==
- Cantons of Pas-de-Calais
- Communes of Pas-de-Calais
- Arrondissements of the Pas-de-Calais department
