= Quœux-Haut-Maînil =

- Commune
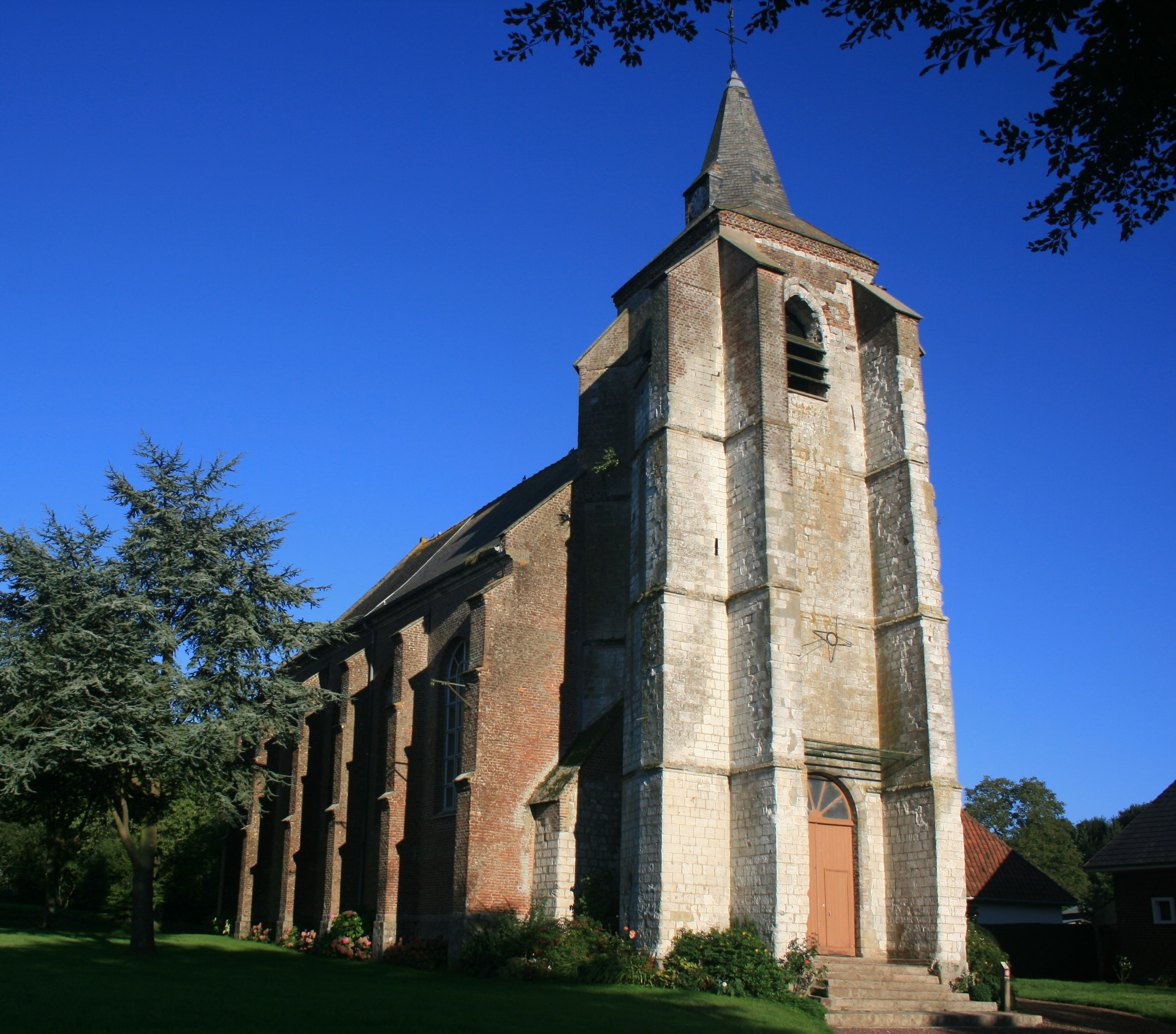
- The church of Quœux-Haut-Maînil

- Coat of arms
- Location of Quœux-Haut-Maînil
- Location within France Location within Hauts-de-France
- Coordinates: 50°18′06″N 2°06′42″E
- Country: France
- Region: Hauts-de-France
- Department: Pas-de-Calais
- Arrondissement: Arras
- Canton: Auxi-le-Château
- Intercommunality: CC Ternois

Government
  - Mayor (2020–2026): Fredy Tirmarche
- Area^{1}: 12.01 km^{2} (4.64 sq mi)
- Elevation: 131 m (430 ft)
- Highest elevation: 139 m (456 ft)
- Lowest elevation: 77 m (253 ft)
- Population (2023): 210
  - Density: 17/km^{2} (45/sq mi)
- Time zone: UTC+01:00 (CET)
  - Summer (DST): UTC+02:00 (CEST)
- INSEE/Postal code: 62683 /62390
- ^{1} French Land Register data, which excludes lakes, ponds, glaciers > 1 km^{2} (0.386 sq mi or 247 acres) and river estuaries.

Quœux-Haut-Maînil (French pronunciation: [kø o mɛnil]) is a commune in the Pas-de-Calais department in the Hauts-de-France region of France.

== Geography ==
Quœux-Haut-Maînil is situated 33 miles (53 km) west of Arras, at the junction of the D101 and D117 roads.

== Population ==
Historical population
Year	Pop.	±% p.a.
1968	334	—
1975	309	−1.11%
1982	328	+0.86%
1990	273	−2.27%
1999	262	−0.46%
2007	240	−1.09%
2012	246	+0.50%
2017	257	+0.88%
2023	210	−3.31%
Source: INSEE

== Places of interest ==
- The unusually large church of St.Jacques, dating from the fifteenth century.
- The church of St. Thomas.
- Traces of an old castle.

== See also ==
- Communes of the Pas-de-Calais department
