= Raye-sur-Authie =

- Commune
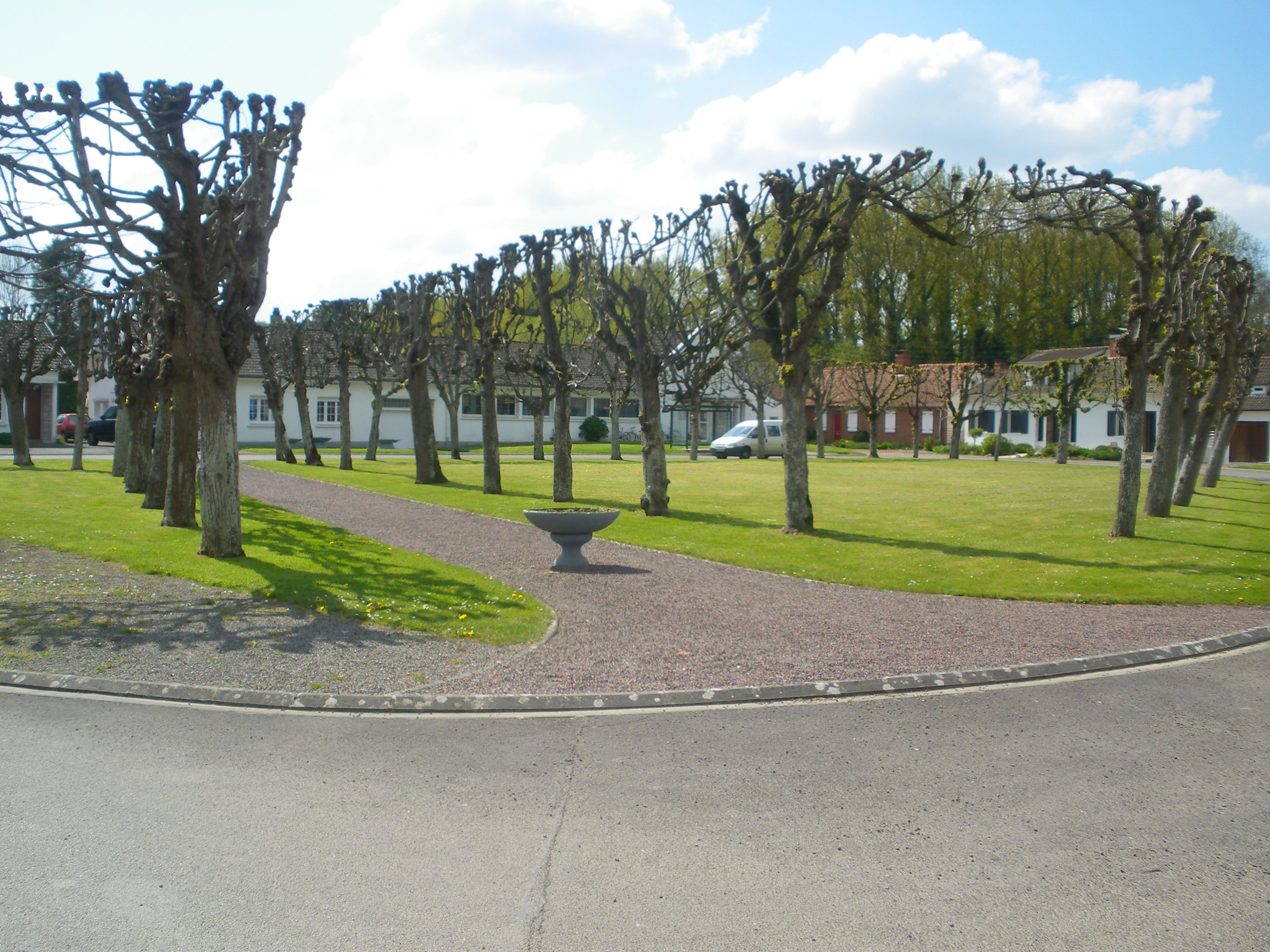
- The square of Raye-sur-Authie

- Coat of arms
- Location of Raye-sur-Authie
- Location within France Location within Hauts-de-France
- Coordinates: 50°17′55″N 1°56′57″E
- Country: France
- Region: Hauts-de-France
- Department: Pas-de-Calais
- Arrondissement: Montreuil
- Canton: Auxi-le-Château
- Intercommunality: CC des 7 Vallées

Government
  - Mayor (2020–2026): Monique Dufour
- Area^{1}: 5.89 km^{2} (2.27 sq mi)
- Elevation: 16 m (52 ft)
- Highest elevation: 101 m (331 ft)
- Lowest elevation: 12 m (39 ft)
- Population (2023): 227
  - Density: 38.5/km^{2} (99.8/sq mi)
- Time zone: UTC+01:00 (CET)
  - Summer (DST): UTC+02:00 (CEST)
- INSEE/Postal code: 62690 /62140
- ^{1} French Land Register data, which excludes lakes, ponds, glaciers > 1 km^{2} (0.386 sq mi or 247 acres) and river estuaries.

Raye-sur-Authie is a commune in the Pas-de-Calais department in the Hauts-de-France region of France 15 miles (24 km) southeast of Montreuil-sur-Mer, on the river Authie, the border with the Somme department.

== Population ==
Historical population
Year	Pop.	±% p.a.
1968	336	—
1975	317	−0.83%
1982	271	−2.21%
1990	259	−0.56%
1999	255	−0.17%
2007	232	−1.17%
2012	221	−0.97%
2017	250	+2.50%
2023	227	−1.60%
Source: INSEE

== See also ==
- Communes of the Pas-de-Calais department
