= Bouin-Plumoison =

- Commune
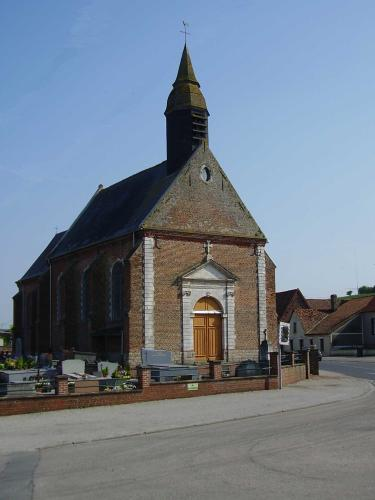
- The church of Bouin-Plumoison

- Coat of arms
- Location of Bouin-Plumoison
- Location within France Location within Hauts-de-France
- Coordinates: 50°22′54″N 1°59′32″E
- Country: France
- Region: Hauts-de-France
- Department: Pas-de-Calais
- Arrondissement: Montreuil
- Canton: Auxi-le-Château
- Intercommunality: CC des 7 Vallées

Government
  - Mayor (2020–2026): Pierre Liefhooghe
- Area^{1}: 6.22 km^{2} (2.40 sq mi)
- Elevation: 26 m (85 ft)
- Highest elevation: 128 m (420 ft)
- Lowest elevation: 17 m (56 ft)
- Population (2023): 511
  - Density: 82.2/km^{2} (213/sq mi)
- Time zone: UTC+01:00 (CET)
  - Summer (DST): UTC+02:00 (CEST)
- INSEE/Postal code: 62661 /62140
- ^{1} French Land Register data, which excludes lakes, ponds, glaciers > 1 km^{2} (0.386 sq mi or 247 acres) and river estuaries.

Bouin-Plumoison (French pronunciation: [bwɛ̃ plymwazɔ̃]) is a commune in the Pas-de-Calais department in the Hauts-de-France region in northern France.

== Geography ==
A small village situated some 2 miles (3 km) west of Hesdin on the D149 road.

== Population ==
Historical population
Year	Pop.	±% p.a.
1968	357	—
1975	392	+1.35%
1982	473	+2.72%
1990	481	+0.21%
1999	514	+0.74%
2007	461	−1.35%
2012	465	+0.17%
2017	494	+1.22%
2023	511	+0.57%
Source: INSEE

== See also ==
- Communes of the Pas-de-Calais department
