= Le Ponchel =

- Commune
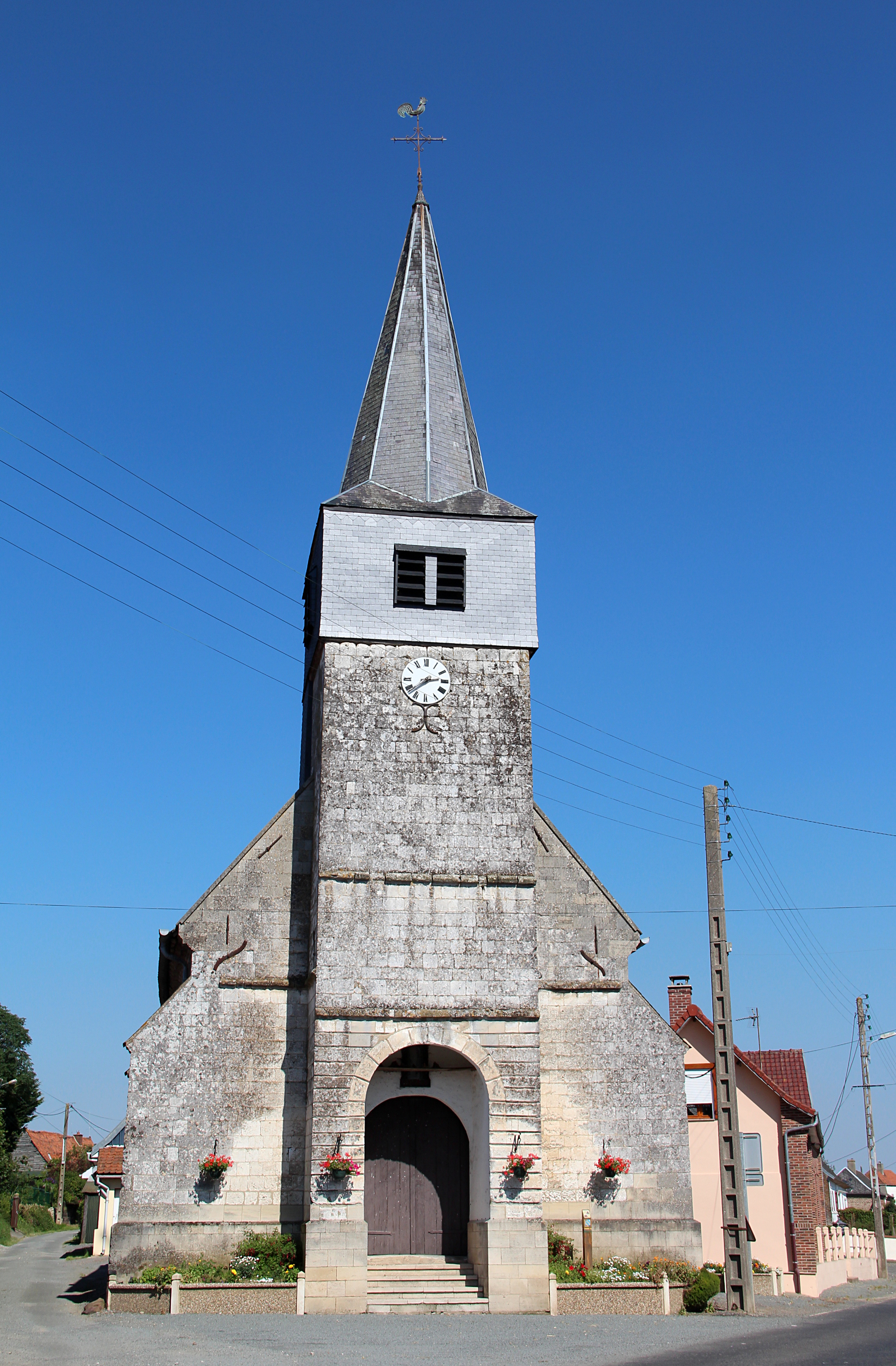
- The church of Le Ponchel

- Coat of arms
- Location of Le Ponchel
- Location within France Location within Hauts-de-France
- Coordinates: 50°15′28″N 2°04′30″E
- Country: France
- Region: Hauts-de-France
- Department: Pas-de-Calais
- Arrondissement: Arras
- Canton: Auxi-le-Château
- Intercommunality: CC Ternois

Government
  - Mayor (2020–2026): Jacqueline Dewarumetz
- Area^{1}: 4.68 km^{2} (1.81 sq mi)
- Elevation: 27 m (89 ft)
- Highest elevation: 116 m (381 ft)
- Lowest elevation: 22 m (72 ft)
- Population (2023): 216
  - Density: 46.2/km^{2} (120/sq mi)
- Time zone: UTC+01:00 (CET)
  - Summer (DST): UTC+02:00 (CEST)
- INSEE/Postal code: 62665 /62390
- ^{1} French Land Register data, which excludes lakes, ponds, glaciers > 1 km^{2} (0.386 sq mi or 247 acres) and river estuaries.

Le Ponchel (French pronunciation: [lə pɔ̃ʃɛl]; Picard: Ponché) is a commune in the Pas-de-Calais department in the Hauts-de-France region of France 34 miles (55 km) west of Arras on the banks of the Authie river, the border with the department of the Somme.

== Population ==
Historical population
Year	Pop.	±% p.a.
1968	230	—
1975	192	−2.55%
1982	193	+0.07%
1990	210	+1.06%
1999	213	+0.16%
2007	224	+0.63%
2012	220	−0.36%
2017	207	−1.21%
2023	216	+0.71%
Source: INSEE

== See also ==
- Communes of the Pas-de-Calais department
