= Haravesnes =

- Commune
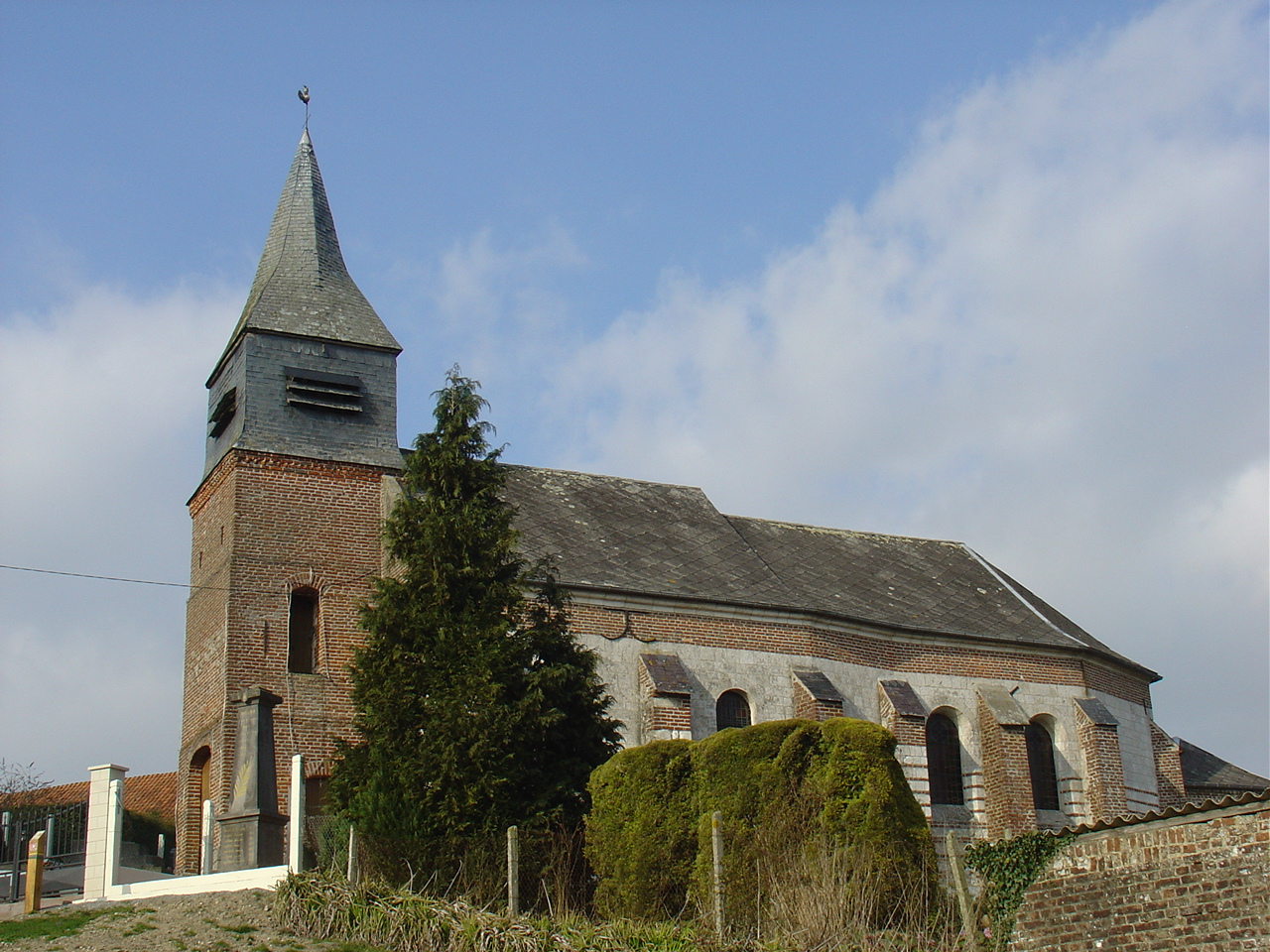
- The church of Haravesnes

- Coat of arms
- Location of Haravesnes
- Location within France Location within Hauts-de-France
- Coordinates: 50°17′16″N 2°07′51″E
- Country: France
- Region: Hauts-de-France
- Department: Pas-de-Calais
- Arrondissement: Arras
- Canton: Auxi-le-Château
- Intercommunality: CC Ternois

Government
  - Mayor (2020–2026): Didier Varlet
- Area^{1}: 2.4 km^{2} (0.93 sq mi)
- Elevation: 108 m (354 ft)
- Highest elevation: 139 m (456 ft)
- Lowest elevation: 62 m (203 ft)
- Population (2023): 51
  - Density: 21/km^{2} (55/sq mi)
- Time zone: UTC+01:00 (CET)
  - Summer (DST): UTC+02:00 (CEST)
- INSEE/Postal code: 62411 /62390
- ^{1} French Land Register data, which excludes lakes, ponds, glaciers > 1 km^{2} (0.386 sq mi or 247 acres) and river estuaries.

Haravesnes (French pronunciation: [aʁavɛn]) is a commune in the Pas-de-Calais department in the Hauts-de-France region of France 29 miles (47 km) west of Arras.

== Population ==
Historical population
Year	Pop.	±% p.a.
1968	80	—
1975	71	−1.69%
1982	59	−2.61%
1990	45	−3.33%
1999	36	−2.45%
2007	45	+2.83%
2012	49	+1.72%
2017	50	+0.40%
2023	51	+0.33%
Source: INSEE

== See also ==
- Communes of the Pas-de-Calais department
