= Boffles =

- Commune
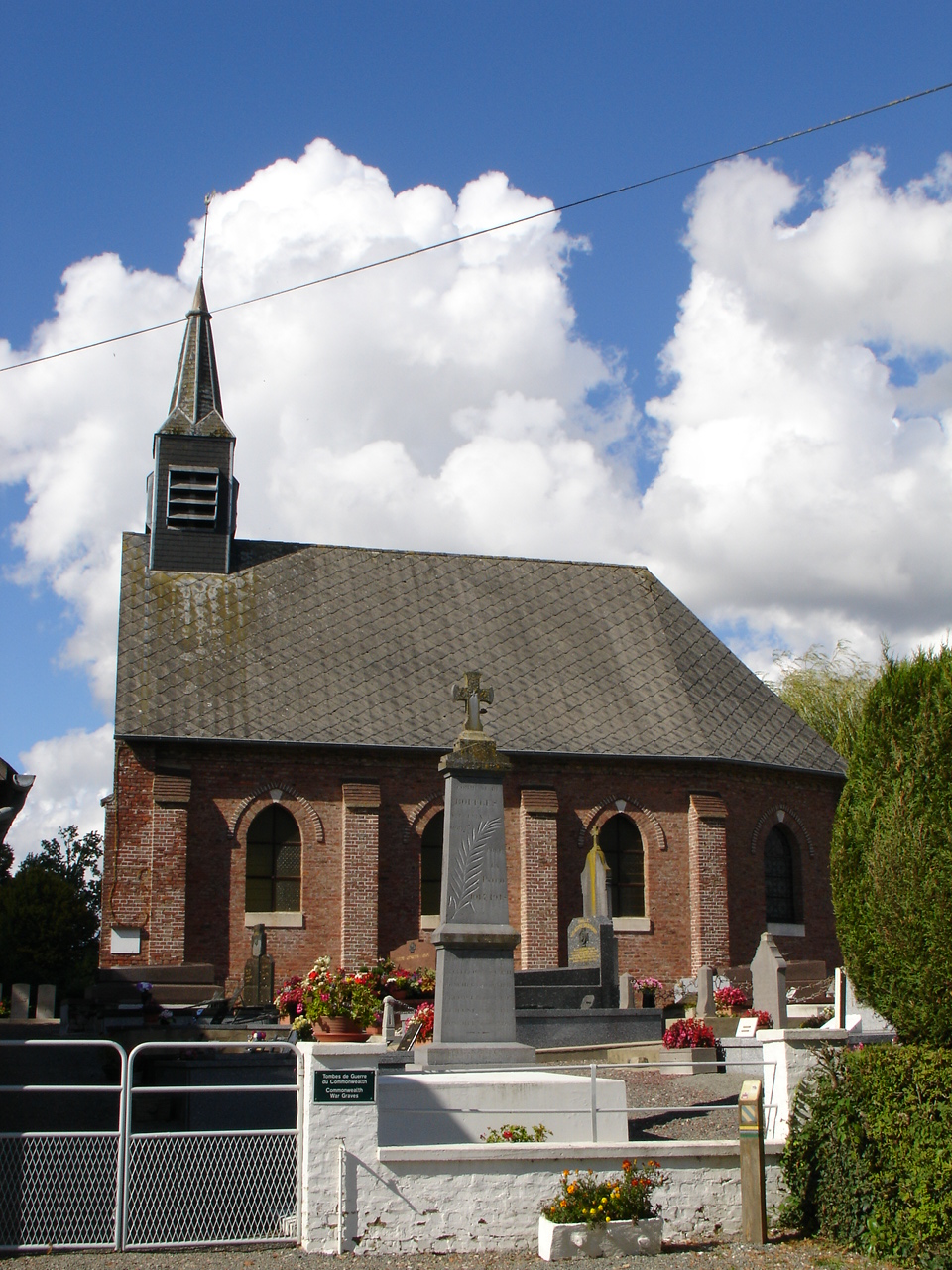
- The church of Boffles

- Coat of arms
- Location of Boffles
- Location within France Location within Hauts-de-France
- Coordinates: 50°15′18″N 2°12′12″E
- Country: France
- Region: Hauts-de-France
- Department: Pas-de-Calais
- Arrondissement: Arras
- Canton: Auxi-le-Château
- Intercommunality: CC Ternois

Government
  - Mayor (2020–2026): Raymond Croisel
- Area^{1}: 3.27 km^{2} (1.26 sq mi)
- Elevation: 123 m (404 ft)
- Highest elevation: 140 m (460 ft)
- Lowest elevation: 80 m (260 ft)
- Population (2023): 46
  - Density: 14/km^{2} (36/sq mi)
- Time zone: UTC+01:00 (CET)
  - Summer (DST): UTC+02:00 (CEST)
- INSEE/Postal code: 62143 /62390
- ^{1} French Land Register data, which excludes lakes, ponds, glaciers > 1 km^{2} (0.386 sq mi or 247 acres) and river estuaries.

Boffles (French pronunciation: [bɔfl]) is a commune in the Pas-de-Calais department in the Hauts-de-France region in northern France.

== Geography ==
Boffles is a small village located 25 miles (41 km) west of Arras on the D116 road. The market town of Auxi-le-Château lies 4 miles to the west and Frevent, 6 miles to the east. Auxi-le-Château has a weekly market, banks, supermarkets and a selection of shops. There are also several restaurants and bars serving local French cuisine.

The village is situated near a number of sights of the Pas-de-Calais and the Somme region, including a number of museums and battlefield sites relating to both first and second world wars.

The Picardy region and Paris are also accessible from the village.

Boffles has its own Maire, Raymond Croisel, Mairie at 21 Rue Marronniers and a church and records date to 1763.

As well as French residents, there are a number of English, Dutch and Brazilian people who live in the village.

The graves of four British soldiers killed during wartime can be seen in the churchyard.

There are a number of community and social gatherings throughout the year.

== Population ==
The inhabitants of Boffles are known as Bofflois in French.

Historical population
Year	Pop.	±% p.a.
1968	52	—
1975	56	+1.06%
1982	40	−4.69%
1990	41	+0.31%
1999	34	−2.06%
2007	46	+3.85%
2012	48	+0.85%
2017	50	+0.82%
2023	46	−1.38%
Source: INSEE

== Sights ==
- The church of St. Martin, dating from the nineteenth century.
- The Commonwealth War Graves Commission graves.
- An English speaking Gite Complex Le Petit Hameau
- Walks, countryside views and cycling opportunities.

== See also ==
- Communes of the Pas-de-Calais department
