= Buire-au-Bois =

- Commune
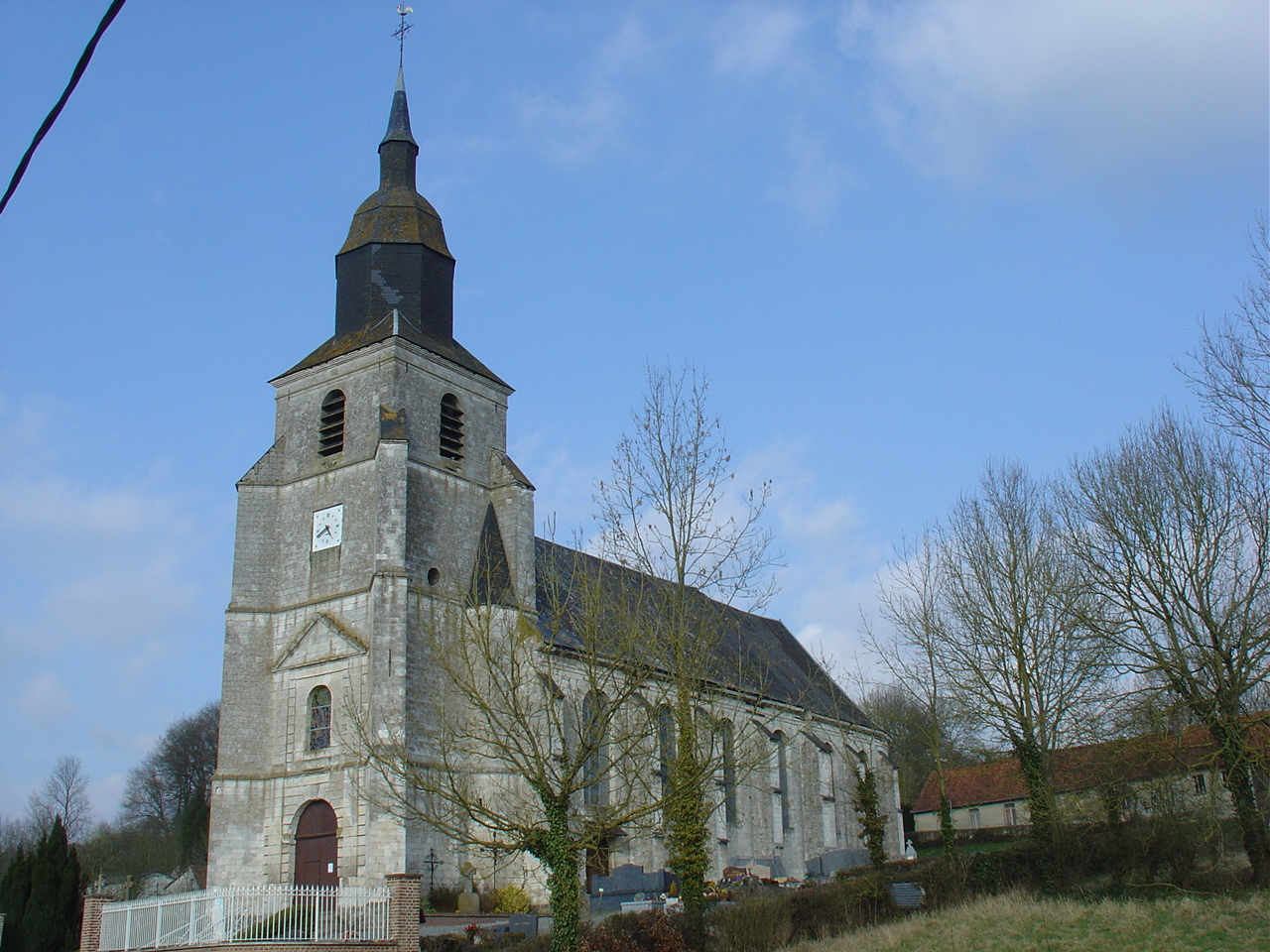
- The church of Buire-au-Bois

- Coat of arms
- Location of Buire-au-Bois
- Location within France Location within Hauts-de-France
- Coordinates: 50°15′47″N 2°09′11″E
- Country: France
- Region: Hauts-de-France
- Department: Pas-de-Calais
- Arrondissement: Arras
- Canton: Auxi-le-Château
- Intercommunality: CC Ternois

Government
  - Mayor (2020–2026): Thierry Bascour
- Area^{1}: 11.81 km^{2} (4.56 sq mi)
- Elevation: 75 m (246 ft)
- Highest elevation: 142 m (466 ft)
- Lowest elevation: 49 m (161 ft)
- Population (2023): 237
  - Density: 20.1/km^{2} (52.0/sq mi)
- Time zone: UTC+01:00 (CET)
  - Summer (DST): UTC+02:00 (CEST)
- INSEE/Postal code: 62182 /62390
- ^{1} French Land Register data, which excludes lakes, ponds, glaciers > 1 km^{2} (0.386 sq mi or 247 acres) and river estuaries.

Buire-au-Bois (French pronunciation: [bɥiʁ o bwa]) is a commune in the Pas-de-Calais department in the Hauts-de-France region in northern France.

== Geography ==
A small farming commune located 25 miles (40 km) west of Arras on the D117 road, at the junction with the D102.

Buire-au-Bois is a typical rural community, comprising the village itself and the hamlet of Bachimont. Through various reasons, such as the lack of employment, many young people have moved out of the area. Many houses are being bought and used by English and Dutch francophiles.

== Population ==
Historical population
Year	Pop.	±% p.a.
1968	308	—
1975	272	−1.76%
1982	244	−1.54%
1990	225	−1.01%
1999	210	−0.76%
2007	202	−0.48%
2012	219	+1.63%
2017	230	+0.98%
2023	237	+0.50%
Source: INSEE

== Sights ==
- The church of Notre-Dame, dating from the eighteenth century
- The eighteenth-century château.
- A seventeenth-century manor house.

== See also ==
- Communes of the Pas-de-Calais department
