= 103rd (Tyneside Irish) Brigade =

103rd Tyneside Irish Brigade 103rd Brigade
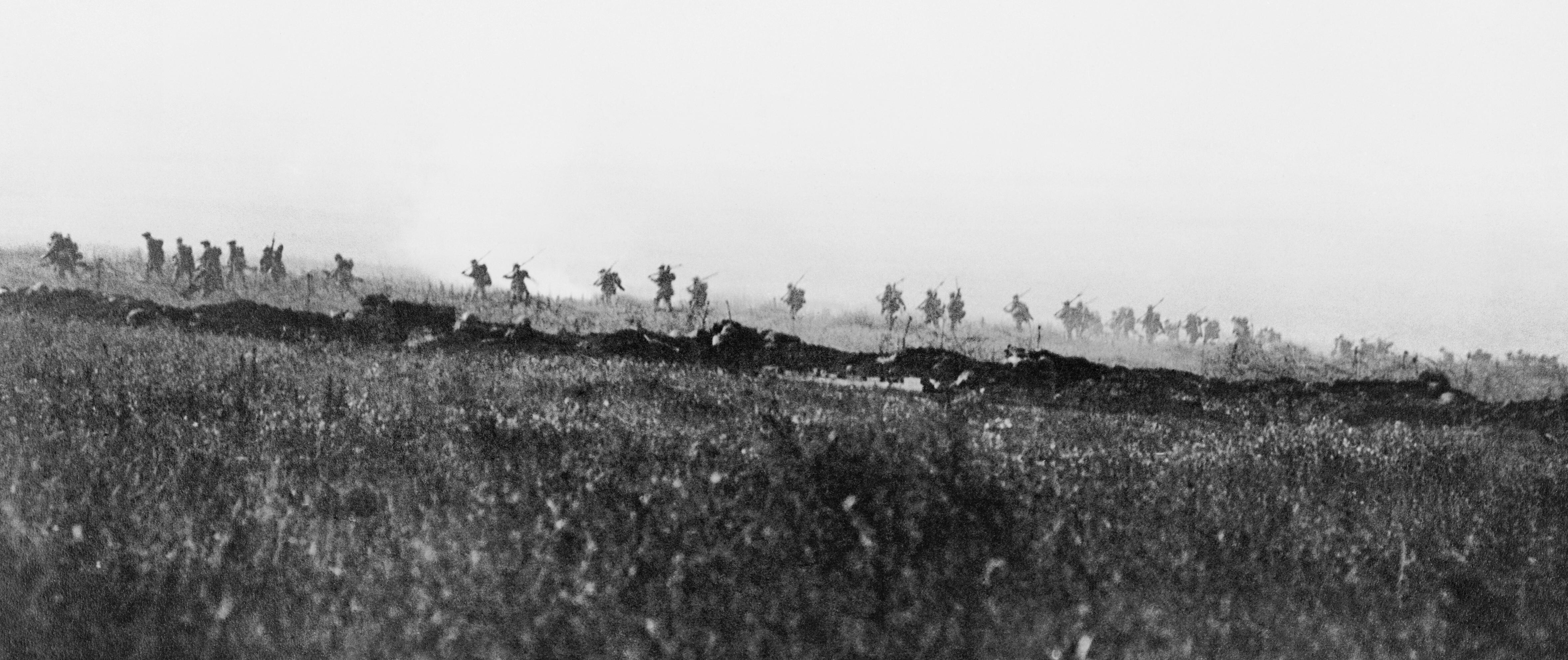
- A support company of the Tyneside Irish Brigade advancing on 1 July 1916
- Active: 1914 – 1918
- Country: United Kingdom
- Branch: British Army
- Type: Infantry
- Role: Line Infantry
- Size: Four New Army Battalions; Two Reserve Battalions

Commanders
- Notable commanders: Neville Cameron

The Tyneside Irish Brigade was a British First World War infantry brigade of Kitchener's Army, raised in 1914. Officially numbered the 103rd (Tyneside Irish) Brigade, it contained four Pals battalions from Newcastle upon Tyne, largely made up of men of Irish extraction. (Another Newcastle brigade — the 102nd (Tyneside Scottish) — contained Tynesiders with Scottish connections).

== History ==
The brigade's four battalions were known as the 1st to 4th Tyneside Irish. When taken over by the British Army, these became battalions of the Royal Northumberland Fusiliers:

- 24th Battalion, Northumberland Fusiliers (1st Tyneside Irish)
- 25th Battalion, Northumberland Fusiliers (2nd Tyneside Irish)
- 26th Battalion, Northumberland Fusiliers (3rd Tyneside Irish)
- 27th Battalion, Northumberland Fusiliers (4th Tyneside Irish)

The reserve battalions were the 30th and 34th (Reserve) Battalions, Northumberland Fusiliers (Tyneside Irish).

Along with the 101st and 102nd Brigades, the Tyneside Irish made up the 34th Division which arrived in France in January 1916 and first saw action in the Battle of the Somme that year. On the first day on the Somme, the 34th Division attacked astride the Albert-Bapaume road at La Boisselle. The brigade's task was to follow up the main attack by the 101st and 102nd Brigades and advance on a line from Pozières to Contalmaison.

Advancing at the same time as the main attack, the brigade started from the reserve trenches on the Tara-Usna Line. The four battalions, marching in extended line (from left to right; the 2nd, 3rd, 1st and 4th), advanced down into Avoca Valley and then up the other side to the British front-line trench. From there they had to cross no man's land, pass through the German front-line and advance to their objectives. However, the main attack was an almost complete failure and the Tyneside Irish were utterly exposed to the machine guns of the German defences. The brigade suffered heavy casualties even before its battalions reached the British front-line. Opposite La Boisselle the brigade was halted but on the right, elements of the 1st and 4th battalions were able to advance up 'Sausage Valley' and pass through the German front-line. Two small parties met up behind the German support trench and pushed on towards their objective of Contalmaison. Their effort was in vain as they were eventually killed or captured.

The 1st battalion suffered 620 casualties on 1 July (18 officers and 602 other ranks), its commander, Lieutenant Colonel L.M. Howard, was among the dead. The 4th battalion suffered 539 casualties (20 officers and 519 other ranks). The commanders of the 2nd and 3rd battalions were both wounded, as was the brigade commander, Brigadier General N.J.G. Cameron.

The brigade's losses on 1 July were so severe that on the 6th, it, along with the 102nd (Tyneside Scottish) Brigade, was transferred to the 37th Division, swapping with the 112th Brigade. The two brigades returned to the 34th Division on 22 August.

In February 1918 the 1st, 3rd and 4th Tyneside Irish battalions were disbanded and the remaining battalion, the 2nd, was transferred to the 116th Brigade of the 39th Division. From then on the Tyneside Irish Brigade ceased to exist and the brigade was simply the 103rd Brigade.
