= 34th Brigade (United Kingdom) =

Military unit

The 34th Brigade was a formation of the British Army. It was one of the New Army (or Kitchener's Army) brigades, and assigned to the 11th (Northern) Division. It served on the Western Front during the First World War.

== Formation ==
- 8th Battalion, Northumberland Fusiliers
- 9th Battalion, Lancashire Fusiliers (disbanded 21 February 1918)
- 5th Battalion, Dorsetshire Regiment (joined 18 January 1918)
- 11th Battalion, Manchester Regiment
- 34th Machine Gun Company (formed March 1916, moved into 11th MG Battalion 28 February 1918)
- 34th Trench Mortar Battery (joined July 1917)
