= Tyneside Scottish =

- Country: United Kingdom
- Branch: British Army
- Motto: Harder than Hammers
- March: Highland Laddie
- Battle honours: First World War * Somme 1916 * Albert 1916 * Arras 1917 * Scarpe 1917 * Alleux * St Quentin * Lys * Estaires; Second World War * Defence of Rauray

Tyneside Scottish is an honour title which has been held by a variety of British Army units since 1914. The Regiments which have held the title are the Northumberland Fusiliers, Durham Light Infantry, Black Watch and Royal Artillery. The Tyneside Scottish title is currently maintained by 204 (Tyneside Scottish) Battery Royal Artillery.

== History ==
=== First World War ===
The origins of the Tyneside Scottish are in the Kitchener's Army and the call to arms in the First World War. The Recruitment to the British Army during the First World War saw the raising of the Pals battalion. The Tyneside Scottish Committee was formed and raised four service Battalions of the Northumberland Fusiliers. These were the 20th (Service) Battalion (1st Tyneside Scottish), 21st (Service) Battalion (2nd Tyneside Scottish), 22nd (Service) Battalion (3rd Tyneside Scottish) and 23rd (Service) Battalion (4th Tyneside Scottish). They formed the 102nd (Tyneside Scottish) Brigade, part of the 34th Division. The 29th (Reserve) Battalion and the 33rd (Reserve) Battalion were formed from the depot companies of the Tyneside Scottish battalions.

The Brigade's first major action was the Battle of the Somme where it sustained a large number of casualties. The Brigade was subsequently brought up to strength and served at Armentiers, Battle of Arras, and the final battles of 1918. The Brigade was disbanded in 1918.

=== Second World War ===
In March 1939 the TA expanded and the 12th (Tyneside Scottish) Battalion, the Durham Light Infantry was authorised to be raised as the Tyneside Scottish. In February 1940 the battalion secured affiliation with a Scottish unit and became the 1st Battalion Tyneside Scottish, Black Watch (Royal Highland Regiment). The battalion deployed to France as part of as part of the British Expeditionary Force and were part of the Dunkirk evacuation. Following a period of Home Defence, 1st Tyneside Scottish joined the 49th (West Riding) Division and were sent to Iceland. Returning to England in 1942 another period of Home Defence preceded the Normandy landings in 1944. The battalion were engaged in Operation Martlet gaining the Battle Honour "Defence of Rauray". Following the Battle and subsequent actions in the Caen area, the battalion was reduced to cadre strength and subsequently placed in suspended animation.

=== Post-war ===
In January 1947 on the re-constitution of the Territorial Army, the honour title passed to the Royal Artillery. Initially the title was held by 670th Light Anti-Aircraft Regiment, RA (Tyneside Scottish), before passing to a Battery, 439th Light Anti-Aircraft Regiment, RA (based in Tynemouth) in March 1955. 439th Light Air Defence Regiment was one of four regiments that amalgamated to form 101st (Northumbrian) Regiment Royal Artillery in 1967. In 1974, the Tyneside Scottish title was adopted by 204 (Tyneside Scottish) Battery Royal Artillery, part of 101st (Northumbrian) Regiment Royal Artillery.

== Tyneside Scottish Memorials ==
The memorial to the Tyneside Scottish Brigade is situated at La Boiselle, Somme, where the Brigade sustained heavy casualties on first day of the Somme. The memorial, in the form of a seat also commemorates the losses of the Tyneside Irish. The memorial was unveiled in 1920 by Marshal Foch.

== Sources ==
- Hewitson, T L (2006). Weekend Warriors. Tempus Publishing. ISBN 0-7524-3756-9.
