= 34th Division (United Kingdom) =

Infantry division of the British Army during the First World War

- Formation patch of the 34th Division.
- Active: April 1915 – 1919
- Country: United Kingdom
- Branch: British Army
- Type: Infantry
- Size: Division
- Engagements: First World War

The 34th Division was an infantry division of the British Army that was raised in 1914, during the First World War. The division was raised from volunteers for Lord Kitchener's New Armies, originally made up of infantry battalions raised by public subscription or private patronage. The division was taken over by the War Office in September 1915. It served in France and Belgium in the trenches of the Western Front for the duration of the war.

== Unit history ==
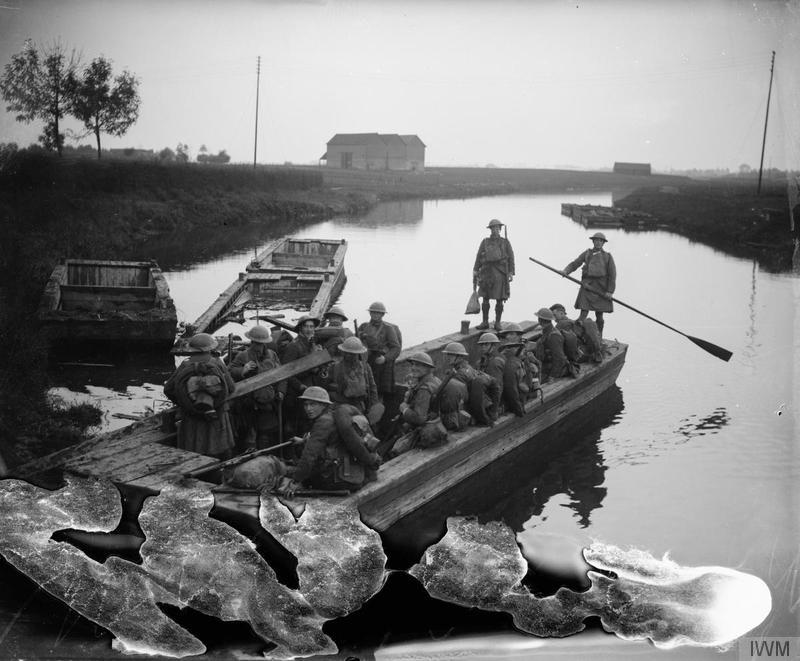
Troops of the 1st/5th Battalion, Argyll and Sutherland Highlanders, crossing the River Lys at Halluin in captured German pontoons, 18 October 1918.

The 34th Division was one of the six created for the Fourth New Army on 10 December 1914. The division was originally made up of Pals battalions, and two brigades of the Northumberland Fusiliers; the Tyneside Scottish and Tyneside Irish. Major-General Edward Ingouville-Williams, an experienced commander who had led an infantry brigade in action with the British Expeditionary Force (BEF) in the early months of the war, took command of the division in June 1915.

The division landed in France in January 1916.

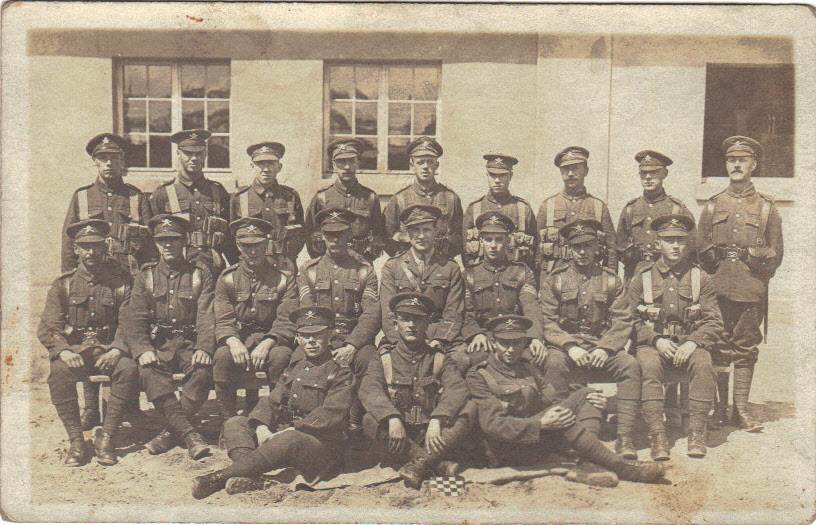
Members of the 34th Battalion, MGC, 1918.

The division's first major action was the attack at La Boisselle on the first day of the Battle of the Somme, which began on 1 July. The division suffered heavy casualties and many of the original Pals became casualties.

The division, now under Major General Lothian Nicholson after Ingouville-Williams was killed on the Somme, went on to suffer further losses at the Battle of the Lys in April 1918. It participated in the Second Battle of the Marne.

Immediately after arrival in France, in the first half of June 1918, the American Expeditionary Forces' 78th Division (less its artillery) detrained at Marquise and moves to the Lumbres Training Area where it was affiliated with the 34th Division.

== Order of Battle ==
The following units served with the division:

101st Brigade

- 15th (Service) Battalion, Royal Scots (1st Edinburgh) (left May 1918)
- 16th (Service) Battalion, Royal Scots (2nd Edinburgh), ('McCrae's Battalion') (left May 1918)
- 10th (Service) Battalion, Lincolnshire Regiment (Grimsby) ('Grimsby Chums') (transferred to 103rd Brigade February 1918)
- 11th (Service) Battalion, Suffolk Regiment (Cambridgeshire) (left May 1918)
- 101st Machine Gun Company (joined 27 April 1916, moved to 34th Battalion Machine Gun Corps (M.G.C.) 26 February 1918)
- 101st Trench Mortar Battery (joined 18 February 1916, broken up 16 May 1918)

After reorganisation in July 1918:

- 2/4th Battalion, Queen's (Royal West Surrey Regiment) (Territorial Force (T.F.)) (joined June 1918)
- 4th Battalion, Royal Sussex Regiment (T.F.) (joined June 1918)
- 2nd Battalion, Loyal North Lancashire Regiment (Regular) (joined June 1918)
- 101st Trench Mortar Battery (reformed 2 July 1918)

102nd (Tyneside Scottish) Brigade

- 20th (Service) Battalion, (1st Tyneside Scottish), Northumberland Fusiliers (disbanded February 1918)
- 21st (Service) Battalion, (2nd Tyneside Scottish), Northumberland Fusiliers (disbanded February 1918)
- 22nd (Service) Battalion, (3rd Tyneside Scottish), Northumberland Fusiliers (left June 1918)
- 23rd (Service) Battalion, (4th Tyneside Scottish), Northumberland Fusiliers (left June 1918)
- 25th (Service) Battalion, Northumberland Fusiliers (from February 1918 until June 1918)
- 25st (Service) Battalion, (2nd Tyneside Irish), Northumberland Fusiliers (joined February left June 1918)
- 1/4th (T.F.) Battalion, Lincolnshire Regiment (joined and left June 1918)
- 7/8th (Service) Battalion Royal Inniskilling Fusiliers (joined June left July 1918)
- 102nd Machine Gun Company (joined 27 April 1916, moved to 34th Battalion M.G.C. 26 February 1918)
- 102nd Trench Mortar Battery (joined 18 February 1916, broken up 16 May 1918)

After reorganisation in July 1918:

- 1/1st Battalion, Herefordshire Regiment (joined June 1918)
- 1/4th Battalion, Cheshire Regiment (joined July 1918)
- 1/7th Battalion, Cheshire Regiment (joined July 1918)
- 102nd Trench Mortar Battery (reformed 10 July 1918)

103rd (Tyneside Irish) Brigade

- 24th (Service) Battalion, (1st Tyneside Irish), Northumberland Fusiliers (merged with 27th Battalion to form 24/27th Battalion N.F. on 10 August 1917, disbanded February 1918)
- 25th (Service) Battalion, (2nd Tyneside Irish), Northumberland Fusiliers (left February 1918)
- 26th (Service) Battalion, (3rd Tyneside Irish), Northumberland Fusiliers (disbanded February 1918)
- 27th (Service) Battalion,(4th Tyneside Irish), Northumberland Fusiliers (merged with 27th Battalion to form 24/27th Battalion N.F. on 10 August 1917)
- 9th (Service) Battalion, the Northumberland Fusiliers (joined August 1917, left 26 May 1918)
- 1st Battalion, East Lancashire Regiment (joined February 1918 left May 1918)
- 10th (Service) Battalion (Grimsby Chums), Lincolnshire Regiment (transferred from 101st Brigade February 1918 left June 1918)
- 103rd Machine Gun Company (joined 27 April 1916, moved to 34th Battalion M.G.C. 26 February 1918)
- 103rd Trench Mortar Battery (joined 18 February 1916, broken up 16 May 1918)

After reorganisation in July 1918:

- 1/5th (Dumfries and Galloway) (T.F.) Battalion, King's Own Scottish Borderers (joined June 1918)
- 1/8th Battalion, (T.F.) Cameronians (Scottish Rifles) (joined June 1918)
- 1/5th (Renfrewshire) (T.F.) Battalion, Argyll & Sutherland Highlanders (joined June 1918)
- 103rd Trench Mortar Battery (reformed 1 July 1918)

On the First day on the Somme, the division had the largest number of casualties of the British divisions, the 102nd Brigade had 2,324 casualties and the 103rd Brigade incurred 1,968 losses. From 6 July – 22 August, the brigades were swapped with the 111th and 112th brigades of the 37th Division, which was holding the line on a quiet sector at Vimy Ridge.

Divisional Troops

- 18th (Service) Battalion, the Northumberland Fusiliers (joined as Divisional Pioneer Battalion July 1915, left June 1918)
- 2/4th (T.F.) Battalion, the Somerset Light Infantry (joined as Divisional Pioneer Battalion June 1918)

Thirteen other infantry battalions joined the Division for short periods during its reorganisation in mid 1918, all had left by July 1918)

- 19th Motor Machine Gun Battery (joined November 1915 left 6 February 1916)
- 240th Machine Gun Company (joined 18 July 1917, moved to 34th Battalion M.G.C. 26 February 1918)
- 34th Battalion M.G.C. (formed 26 February 1918 absorbing the brigade M.G. companies)
- Divisional Mounted Troops
  - E Squadron, North Irish Horse (left May 1916)
  - 34th Divisional Cyclist Company, Army Cyclist Corps (left 11 May 1916)
- 34th Divisional Train Army Service Corps
  - 229th, 230th, 231st and 232nd Companies.
- 44th Mobile Veterinary Section Army Veterinary Corps
- 231st Divisional Employment Company (joined 25 May 1917)

Royal Artillery

The Divisional artillery was placed under temporary command of 5th Division while the infantry was being reorganised in mid 1918.

- CLII Brigade, Royal Field Artillery (R.F.A.)
- CLX Brigade, R.F.A.
- CLXXV Brigade, R.F.A. (left 26 January 1917)
- CLXXVI (Howitzer) Brigade, R.F.A. (broken up 28 August 1916)
- 130th Heavy Battery Royal Garrison Artillery (R.G.A.) (raised with Division but moved independently to France)
- 516th Heavy Battery R.G.A. (joined CLXXV Brigade 7 October 1916)
- 34th (Nottingham) Divisional Ammunition Column R.F.A.
- V.34 Heavy Trench Mortar Battery, R.F.A. (formed by 16 August 1916; left for VI Corps 6 March 1918)
- X.34, Y.34 and Z.34 Medium Mortar Batteries, R.F.A. (formed by 18 June 1916; on 6 March 1918, Z broken up and distributed among X and Y batteries)

Royal Engineers

- 105th Field Company (left February 1915)
- 106th Field Company (left February 1915)
- 207th (Norfolk) Field Company (joined February 1915)
- 208th (Norfolk) Field Company (joined February 1915)
- 209th (Norfolk) Field Company (joined February 1915)
- 34th Divisional Signals Company

Royal Army Medical Corps

- 102nd Field Ambulance
- 103rd Field Ambulance
- 104th Field Ambulance
- 74th Sanitary Section (left 31 March 1917)

== Commanders ==
- Major-General Edward Ingouville-Williams 1915 – 22 July 1916
- Major-General Lothian Nicholson 22 July 1916 – March 1919

== See also ==
- List of British divisions in World War I
