= 37th Division (United Kingdom) =

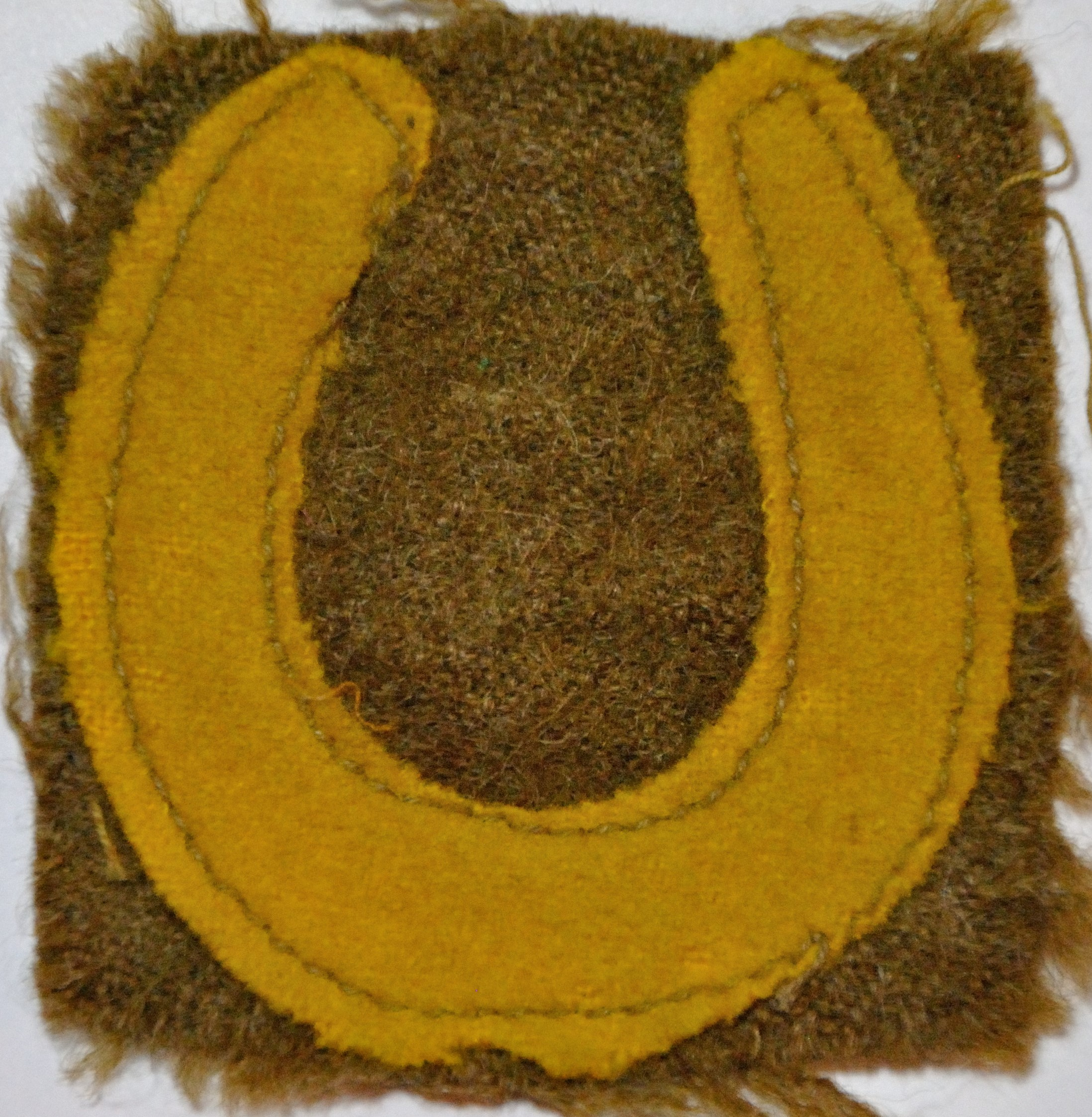
- Formation sign of the 37th Division.
- Active: March 1915 – March 1919
- Country: United Kingdom
- Branch: British Army
- Type: Infantry
- Size: Division
- Engagements: First World War: Battles of the Somme; Battle of the Ancre; Battle of Arras (1917); First Battle of the Scarpe; Monchy le Preux; Second Battle of the Scarpe; Battle of Arleux; Battles of Ypres; Battle of Pilckem Ridge; Battle of Menin Road; Battle of Polygon Wood; Battle of Broodseinde; Battle of Poelcapelle; First Battle of Passchendaele; First Battles of the Somme (1918); Battle of the Ancre (1918); Second Battles of the Somme (1918); Battle of Albert (1918); Battles of the Hindenburg Line; Battle of Havrincourt; Battle of the Canal du Nord; Battle of Cambrai; Pursuit to the Selle; The Final Advance in Picardy; Battle of the Selle; Battle of the Sambre

Commanders
- Notable commanders: Count Edward Gleichen

The 37th Division was an infantry division of the British Army, raised during the First World War. The divisional symbol was a gold horseshoe, open end up.

== History ==
Formed as part of the Sixth New Army (K6) - the last wave of such divisions organised under Field Marshal Lord Kitchener - the division was established at Andover, Hampshire, as the "44th Division" in mid-March 1915. Despite the success in raising the 10th (Irish) Division, delays in recruitment in southern Ireland saw the 44th Division take the place of the 16th (Irish) Division in the Second New Army. The 44th thus was redesignated as the "37th Division." This included a renumbering of its constituent brigades from the 131st, 132nd, and 133rd to the 110th, 111th, and 112th.

The division's three infantry brigades were composed of the following battalions; the 6th, 7th, 8th, and 9th Leicestershire Regiment in the 110th Brigade, the 10th and 13th Royal Fusiliers, 13th King's Royal Rifle Corps, and 13th Rifle Brigade in the 111th Brigade, and the 11th Royal Warwickshire Regiment, 6th Bedfordshire Regiment, 8th East Lancashire Regiment, and 10th Loyal North Lancashire Regiment in the 112th Brigade. The 9th North Staffordshire Regiment provided the divisional pioneer battalion. The divisional artillery had been raised for the original 31st and 32nd divisions, which were broken up before being completed. The 37th Division's field ambulances (48th, 49th, and 50th) joined from the 16th Division by June 1915.

As a result of pushing for a rapid deployment, using unallocated battalions from the first three waves of New Army battalions alongside groups of K6 officers and men, the division was diverse in experience and training within the New Army. By 12 April 1915, the division marshalled on Salisbury Plain and its newly appointed commander, Major-General Count Edward Gleichen of the Grenadier Guards, a former infantry brigade commander in the original British Expeditionary Force (BEF) of 1914, headquartered at Andover, Hampshire. Gleichen's experience included commanding the 15th Infantry Brigade in the 5th Division during the opening campaigns fought by the original BEF of 1914.

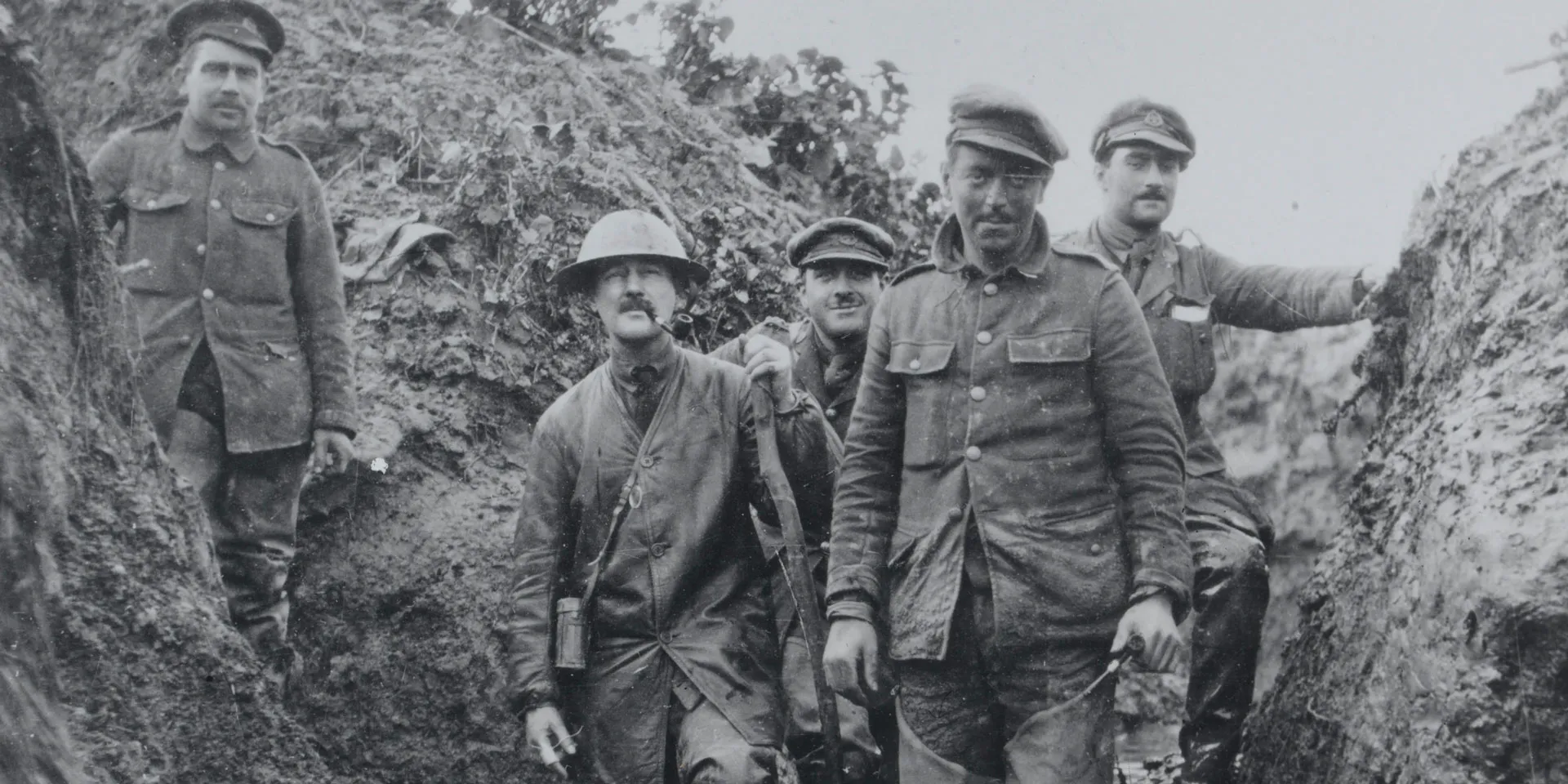
Tommies of the 8th (Service) Battalion, East Lancashire Regiment, in the front line at Foncquevilliers, France, 1915.

The division's unusual composition – the majority of higher-numbered New Army divisions were created from weakly officered Pals battalions and lacked any cadre of experienced soldiers – meant that its training at Cholderton in Hampshire proceeded rapidly, and the 37th Division moved to Saint-Omer in France in July 1915, months earlier than other divisions of the fourth and fifth New Armies. The division was to remain on the Western Front for the rest of the war.

The 37th Division, forming part of VII Corps of the Third Army, played no part in the diversionary Attack on the Gommecourt Salient staged by VII Corps on 1 July 1916, during the first day on the Somme (1 July 1916) which began the Battle of the Somme (1 July – 18 November). The perceived poor performance of some New Army divisions in the fighting and the many losses suffered by the 34th Division, led to changes in the organisation of the 37th Division in the first half of July. The 110th Brigade was posted to the 21st Division and the 63rd Brigade received in return. The 111th and 112th brigades were loaned to the 34th Division from 6 July to 22 August, to replace the 102nd (Tyneside Scottish) and 103rd (Tyneside Irish) Brigades. While under command of the 34th Division, the brigades took part in the Battle of Bazentin Ridge and the Battle of Pozières.

The division took part in the Battle of the Ancre, the final stage of the Battle of the Somme, under the command of V Corps in the Fifth Army in November 1916. By this time Count Gleichen had left the division and his replacement, Major General Scrase-Dickens, had fallen sick. Major General Hugh Bruce Williams (a Royal Engineers officer) had taken over and successfully commanded the division for the rest of the war.

By the year 1917, the division's brigades were rejoined as they wintered in the Artois sector.

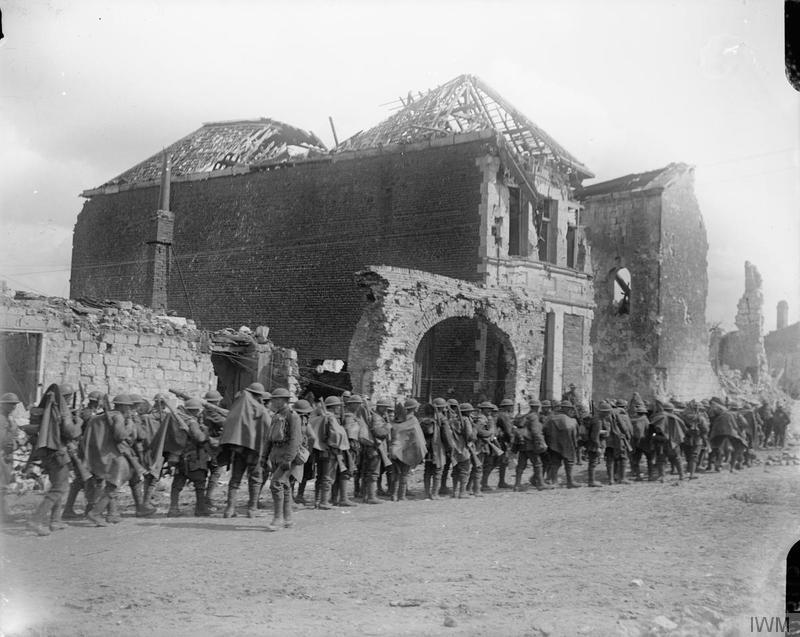
Troops of the 10th (Service) Battalion, Royal Fusiliers (Stockbrokers), halted in Arras, France, before going into action, 9 April 1917.

The division participated in the first three phases of the 1917 Battle of Arras, which began in April, capturing the village of Monchy-le-Preux during the First Battle of the Scarpe; a monument to the division stands at Monchy.

The 37th Division then fought in the Third Battle of Ypres, under the command of IX Corps of the Second Army, taking part in the Battle of the Menin Road Ridge, Battle of Polygon Wood, Battle of Broodseinde, Battle of Poelcappelle, the First Battle of Passchendaele and the Second Battle of Passchendaele from September to November 1917.

The division took little part in the fighting begun by the German Spring Offensive in March 1918, but did take part in the first counter-offensive, the April 1918 Battle of the Ancre, which included the world's first tank versus tank combat at Villers-Bretonneux. At this time the division was under the command of Third Army's IV Corps, and remained part of this formation for the rest of the war.

The division took part in the Hundred Days Offensive, fighting in the Battle of Amiens, the 1918 Second Battle of the Somme, the Battle of the Hindenburg Line, the Battle of the Selle and the Battle of the Sambre. The war came to an end on 11 November 1918.

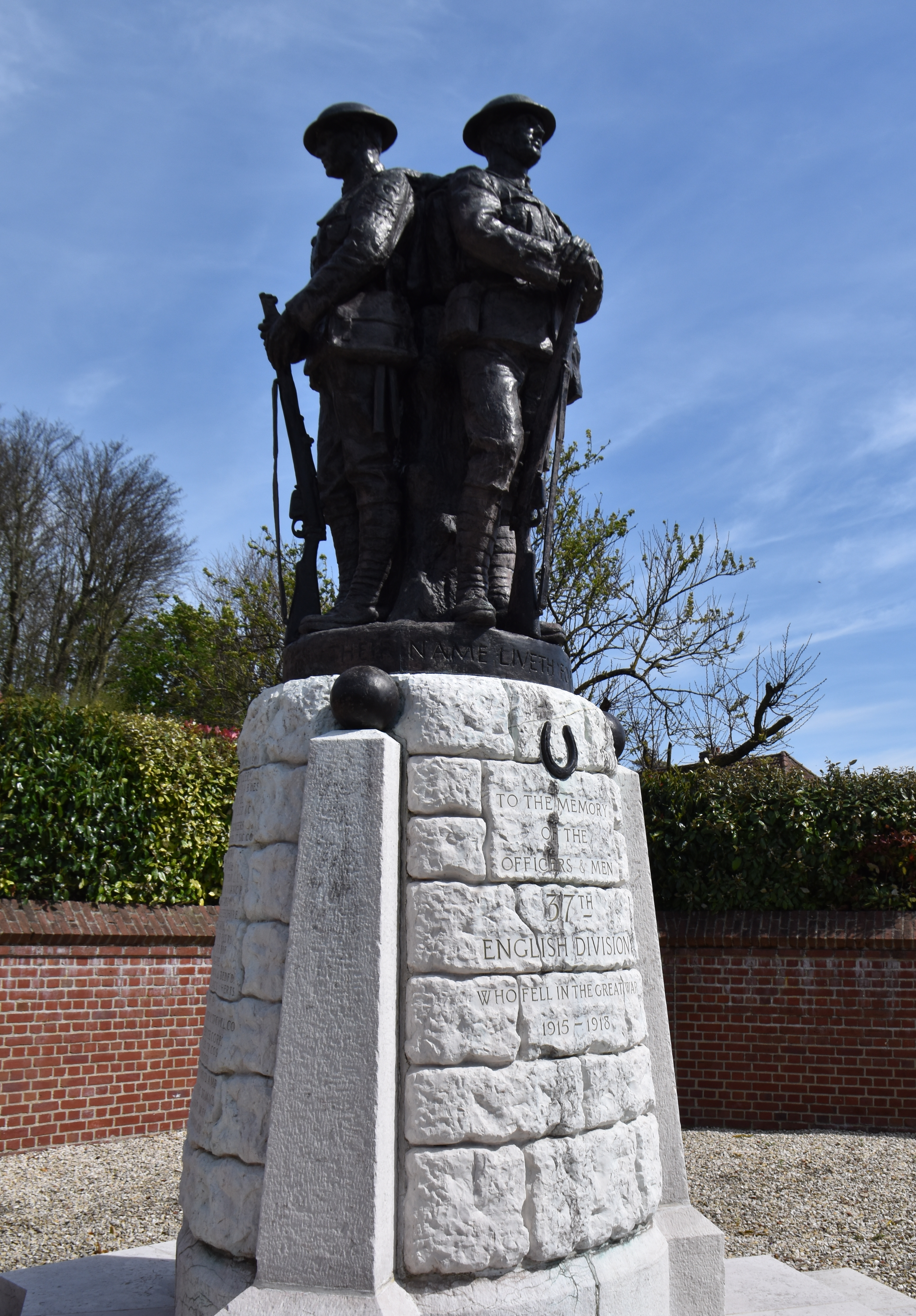
Monument to the 37th Division at Monchy-le-Preux, sculpted by Lady Feodora Gleichen, sister of Major General Lord Edward Gleichen.

Demobilization began on Boxing Day 1918 and the division had ceased to exist on 25 March 1919.

During its active service on the Western Front the division had suffered some 29,969 casualties, killed, wounded and missing.

Immediately following the war, the division compiled a souvenir publication in the form of a trench magazine entitled The Golden Horseshoe (1919). It featured poetry, prose, art, cartoons, and brief accounts of the division's service.

== Order of battle ==
The following units served with the division:

110th Brigade (The Leicester Tigers)

This brigade was exchanged with the 21st Division's 63rd Brigade on 8 July 1916

- 6th (Service) Battalion, Leicestershire Regiment
- 7th (Service) Battalion, Leicestershire Regiment
- 8th (Service) Battalion, Leicestershire Regiment
- 9th (Service) Battalion, Leicestershire Regiment
- 110th Machine Gun Company (joined 4 March 1916, moved to 37th Battalion M.G.C. February 1918)
- 110th Trench Mortar Battery (formed on 13 June 1916)

111th Brigade

This brigade was attached to 34th Division between 6 July and 22 August 1916

- 10th (Service) Battalion, Royal Fusiliers (Stockbrokers)
- 13th (Service) Battalion, Royal Fusiliers (moved to 112th Brigade 4 February 1918)
- 13th (Service) Battalion, King's Royal Rifle Corps
- 13th (Service) Battalion, Rifle Brigade
- 111th Machine Gun Company (joined 4 March 1916, moved to 37th Battalion M.G.C. 4 March 1918)
- 111th Trench Mortar Battery (formed 2 July 1916)

112th Brigade

This brigade was attached to 34th Division between 6 July and 22 August 1916

- 11th (Service) Battalion, Royal Warwickshire Regiment (disbanded 7 February 1918)
- 6th (Service) Battalion, Bedfordshire Regiment (reduced to cadre and bulk of personnel transferred to 1/1st Hertfordshires 21 May 1918)
- 8th (Service) Battalion, East Lancashire Regiment (disbanded 4 February 1918)
- 10th (Service) Battalion, Loyal North Lancashire Regiment (disbanded 4 February 1918)
- 112th Machine Gun Company (joined 4 March 1916, moved to 37th Battalion M.G.C. 4 March 1918)
- 112th Trench Mortar Battery (formed 1 July 1916)
- 13th (Service) Battalion, Royal Fusiliers (joined from 111th Brigade 4 February 1918)
- 1st Battalion, Essex Regiment (joined 4 February 1918)
- 1/1st (T.F.) Battalion, Hertfordshire Regiment (joined 11 May 1918)

63rd Brigade

This brigade joined from 21st Division in exchange for 110th Brigade on 8 July 1916

- 8th (Service) Battalion, Lincolnshire Regiment
- 8th (Service) Battalion, Somerset Light Infantry
- 4th (Service) Battalion, Middlesex Regiment
- 10th (Service) Battalion, York and Lancaster Regiment (disbanded 4 February 1918)
- 63rd Machine Gun Company (moved to 37th Battalion M.G.C. 4 March 1918)
- 63rd Trench Mortar Battery

Divisional Troops

- 9th (Service) Battalion, North Staffordshire Regiment Divisional Pioneer Battalion (was attached to 34th Division with 111th and 112th Brigades in 1916)
- 16th Motor Machine Gun Battery (joined 26 July 1915, left 9 May 1916)
- 247th Machine Gun Company (joined 19 July 1917, moved to 37th Battalion M.G.C. 4 March 1918)
- 37th Battalion M.G.C. (formed 4 March 1918)
- Divisional Mounted Troops
  - RHQ and B Sqn, Yorkshire Dragoons (left May 1916)
  - 37th Divisional Cyclist Company, Army Cyclist Corps (left 12 May 1916)
- 37th Divisional Train A.S.C.
  - 288th, 289th, 290th and 291st Companies.
- 28th Mobile Veterinary Section A.V.C.
- 234th Divisional Employment Company (joined 16 June 1917)

Divisional Artillery

- CXXIII Brigade, R.F.A.
- CXXIV Brigade, R.F.A.
- CXXV Brigade, R.F.A. (broken up 31 August 1916)
- CXVI (Howitzer) Brigade, R.F.A. (broken up January 1917)
- 37th Heavy Battery R.G.A. (raised with the Division but was broken up at home)
- 37th Divisional Ammunition Column R.F.A.
- V.37 Heavy Trench Mortar Battery, R.F.A. (formed 25 May 1916, left 6 February 1918)
- X.37, Y.37 and Z.37 Medium Mortar Batteries, R.F.A. (formed May 1916 with 4 x 6-inch weapons each; on 6 February 1918, Z.37 battery broken up, X.37 and Y.37 reorganised to have 6 x 6-inch weapons each)

Royal Engineers

- 152nd Field Company, R.E.
- 153rd Field Company, R.E.
- 154th Field Company R.E.
- 37th Divisional Signals Company R.E.S.S. (raised as 40th Divisional Signals Company, joined 17 June 1915)

Royal Army Medical Corps

- 48th Field Ambulance
- 49th Field Ambulance
- 50th Field Ambulance
- 37th Sanitary Section(left 20 April 1917)

== General officer commanding ==
- Major-General Lord Edward Gleichen (6 April 1915 – 22 October 1916)
- Major-General S. W. Scrase-Dickens (22 October – 9 November 1916 [invalided])
- Major-General Hugh Bruce Williams (9 November 1916 – 25 March 1919)

== Battle insignia ==
The practice of wearing battalion specific insignia (often called battle patches) in the B.E.F. began in mid 1915 with the arrival of units of Kitchener's Armies and was widespread after the Somme Battles of 1916. The patches shown were worn by the division during 1917 and 1918. There was an overall division scheme for the battle patches, colours for each brigade and shapes for each battalion. This division also identified the companies within each battalion with an oblong coloured red for A company, dark blue for B Coy, purple for C Coy and green for D Coy, which could be worn above or below the battalion patch, as shown below. The patches were worn on both sleeves.

In late 1917 or early 1918 the division sign of a yellow horseshoe was added above the other patches (except for the machine gun companies witch wore it below the battle patch).

63rd Brigade battle patches	From left to right, top row: 8th Lincolns, 8th S.L.I., 4th Middlesex and 10th York and Lancaster. The D.L.I. patches use regimental colours. Bottom row: 63rd Machine gun Company and 63rd Trench Mortar Battery. The 8th S.L.I. and 4th Middlesex also wore the patch on the back, below the collar, with the 4th Middlesex also wearing it in helmet covers.
111th Brigade WW1 patches	From left to right, top row: 10th, 13th Royal Fusiliers, 13th K.R.R.C., 13th Rifle Brigade. Bottom row: 111th Machine gun Company and 111th Trench Mortar Battery.
112th Brigade WW1 patches	From left to right, top row: 11th Royal Warwicks, 6th Bedfords, 8th East Lancs, 10th Loyals. Bottom row: 112h Machine gun Company and 112th Trench Mortar Battery.

== See also ==
- List of British divisions in World War I
