= 112th Brigade (United Kingdom) =

Military unit

The 112th Brigade was a formation of the British Army during the First World War. It was raised as part of the new army also known as Kitchener's Army and assigned to the 37th Division. The brigade was also attached to the 34th Division from July to August 1916.

== Formation ==
left to right, top row: 11th Royal Warwicks, 6th Bedfords, 8th East Lancs, 10th Loyals. Bottom row: 112h Machine gun Company and 112th Trench Mortar Battery.

This brigade was attached to 34th Division between 6 July and 22 August 1916.

- 11th (Service) Battalion, Royal Warwickshire Regiment (disbanded 7 February 1918)
- 6th (Service) Battalion, Bedfordshire Regiment (left 21 May 1918)
- 8th (Service) Battalion, East Lancashire Regiment (disbanded 4 February 1918)
- 10th (Service) Battalion, Loyal North Lancashire Regiment (disbanded 4 February 1918)
- 112th Machine Gun Company (joined 4 March 1916, moved to 37th Battalion M.G.C 4 March 1918)
- 112th Trench Mortar Battery (formed 1 July 1916)
- 13th (Service) Battalion, Royal Fusiliers (joined from 111th Brigade 4 February 1918)
- 1st Battalion, Essex Regiment (joined 4 February 1918)
- 1/1st Battalion, Hertfordshire Regiment (joined 11 May 1918)
