= 102nd (Tyneside Scottish) Brigade =

102nd Brigade Tyneside Scottish Brigade
- Active: 5 November 1914–10 April 1915; 27 April 1915–July 1919
- Country: United Kingdom
- Branch: New Army
- Type: Infantry
- Size: Brigade
- Part of: 34th Division
- Engagements: First day on the Somme; Battle of Arras; German spring offensive Battle of Soissons; Hundred Days Offensive

The 102nd Brigade was an infantry formation of the British Army during World War I. It was raised as part of 'Kitchener's Army' and assigned to the 34th Division. After the original formation was converted into a reserve brigade, the number was transferred to a brigade of 'Tyneside Scottish', four 'Pals battalions' of the Northumberland Fusiliers recruited from men of (mainly) Scottish birth or heritage working on Tyneside. The brigade landed in France at the end of 1915 and then served on the Western Front for the rest of the war. The brigade suffered appalling casualties on the First day of the Battle of the Somme. It recovered to participate in the Battle of Arras in 1917, but was virtually destroyed during the German spring offensive of 1918. It was reconstituted with different units in time to take part in the final battles of the war and the post-war occupation of the Rhineland.

== Original 102nd Brigade ==
Alfred Leete's recruitment poster for Kitchener's Army.

On 6 August 1914, less than 48 hours after Britain's declaration of war, Parliament sanctioned an increase of 500,000 men for the Regular British Army. The newly-appointed Secretary of State for War, Earl Kitchener of Khartoum, issued his famous call to arms: 'Your King and Country Need You', urging the first 100,000 volunteers to come forward. This group of six divisions with supporting arms became known as Kitchener's First New Army, or 'K1'. The K2 and K3 battalions, brigades and divisions followed soon afterwards. So far, the battalions had all been formed at the depots of their parent regiments, but recruits had also been flooding in to the Special Reserve (SR) battalions (the former Militia). These were deployed at their war stations in coastal defence where they were training and equipping reservists to provide reinforcement drafts to the Regular Army fighting overseas. The SR battalions were soon well above their establishment strength and on 8 October 1914 the War Office (WO) ordered each SR battalion to use the surplus to form a service battalion of the 4th New Army ('K4'). In November K4 battalions were organised into 18 brigades numbered from 89 to 106 and formed into the 30th–35th Divisions.

Initially, the K4 units remained in the coast defences alongside their parent SR battalions.

On 5 November 1914 four K4 battalions in the Portland Harbour Garrison were ordered to be formed into 102nd Brigade in 34th Division:

- 14th (Service) Battalion, Royal Scots, formed at Weymouth, Dorset
- 9th (Service) Battalion, King's Own Scottish Borderers, formed at Portland
- 7th (Service) Battalion, Dorset Regiment, formed at Weymouth
- 8th (Service) Battalion, Wiltshire Regiment, formed at Weymouth

On 2 November Brigadier-General R.B. Fell was appointed to command the brigade. The units began training for active service, but the lack of uniforms, weapons, equipment and instructors that had been experienced by the K1–K3 units was even greater for those of K4, and by April 1915 their training was still at an elementary stage. On 10 April 1915 the WO decided to convert the K4 battalions into reserve units, to provide drafts for the K1–K3 battalions in the same way that the SR was doing for the Regular battalions. The K4 divisions were broken up and the brigades were renumbered: 102nd Brigade became 14th Reserve Brigade.

== 102nd (Tyneside Scottish) Brigade ==
Formation sign of the 34th Division.

Meanwhile, the K5 units had been forming since late 1914. These were largely raised by local initiative rather than at regimental depots, and were known as 'Pals battalions'. The first six K5 divisions (37–42) and their constituent brigades were given the numbers of the disbanded K4 formations on 27 April 1915. Thus 123rd Brigade of 41st Division became the new 102nd Brigade in 34th Division. This brigade had been raised on Tyneside largely from Scots working in the mines and industry of the area, though many native 'Geordies' also joined. The request to the WO to form the brigade was originally turned down, but after a visit to Newcastle upon Tyne by Lord Haldane on 10 October 1915, permission was granted. The complete Tyneside Scottish Brigade of four battalions was raised by 16 November 1915 by Johnstone Wallace, Lord Mayor of Newcastle upon Tyne and a committee of Scotsmen. Reports of bodies of men and groups of miners marching 10 miles into the city to enlist are common. It was numbered as 123rd Bde on 10 December and the battalions were assigned to the local regiment, the Northumberland Fusiliers (NF):

- 20th (Service) Battalion, Northumberland Fusiliers (1st Tyneside Scottish), commanded by Lieutenant-Colonel C.H. Innes Hopkins (formerly of the Scottish Rifles)
- 21st (Service) Battalion, Northumberland Fusiliers (2nd Tyneside Scottish), commanded by Colonel V.M. Stockley (formerly of the Indian Cavalry)
- 22nd (Service) Battalion, Northumberland Fusiliers (3rd Tyneside Scottish), commanded by Lt-Col A.P.A. Elphinstone (formerly of the Indian Army)
- 23rd (Service) Battalion, Northumberland Fusiliers (4th Tyneside Scottish), commanded by Captain J.C. Campbell (5th Royal Irish Rifles (Special Reserve))

(The 29th (Reserve) Bn (Tyneside Scottish) was formed in July 1915 from the depot companies of the brigade to train reinforcements, and was expanded to form 33rd (Reserve) Bn (Tyneside Scottish) in addition in June 1916.)

The brigade was concentrated in hutments at Alnwick by March 1915 under the command of retired Brig-Gen Trevor Ternan brought back from the reserve. Training was hampered by the same lack of equipment as the other Kitchener formations, but 34th Division began to form in June 1915. Most of the division trained in North Yorkshire, but 102nd Bde remained at Alnwick until the end of August when the division concentrated on the Salisbury Plain Training Area for final battle training. Although many of the elderly 'dugout' officers were replaced by younger men, Boer War veteran Lt-Col Arthur Elphinstone (a former pupil of Monkton Combe School) continued to command the 3rd Tyneside Scottish. On 13 December the division was ordered to mobilise for service in Egypt, but these orders were rescinded on 26 December and instead the division embarked for France to join the British Expeditionary Force (BEF) fighting on the Western Front. Entrainment for the embarkation ports began on 7 January 1916 and on 15 January it completed its concentration round La Crosse, near Saint-Omer.

== Active service ==
34th Division went into reserve behind III Corps. Parties of all arms were then sent into the line with 8th and 23rd Divisions to learn the routines of Trench warfare. On 24 February the division took over its own sector of the front line. 208th (Norfolk) Field Company, Royal Engineers (RE), was attached to 102nd Bde, but the REs remained in their places in the line while the infantry brigades were rotated between line holding and reserve.

The brigade was joined by its support troops in early 1916:

- 102nd Brigade Machine Gun (MG) Company – formed at Grantham, disembarked at Le Havre on 26 April and joined next day
- 102nd Trench Mortar Battery (TMB) – formed by 17 June from:
  - A/102 TMB formed by 16 February, redesignated 102/1 TMB on 12 March
  - 102/2 TMB formed by 1 June

The TMBs were manned by troops drawn from the infantry battalions.

On 7 April 34th Division was relieved in the line and went to the Second Army training area behind St Omer. Early in May it proceeded by route march and train to Albert in the Somme sector, where it rejoined III Corps, which had moved south to prepare for the forthcoming 'Big Push' (the Battle of the Somme).

=== First day on the Somme ===
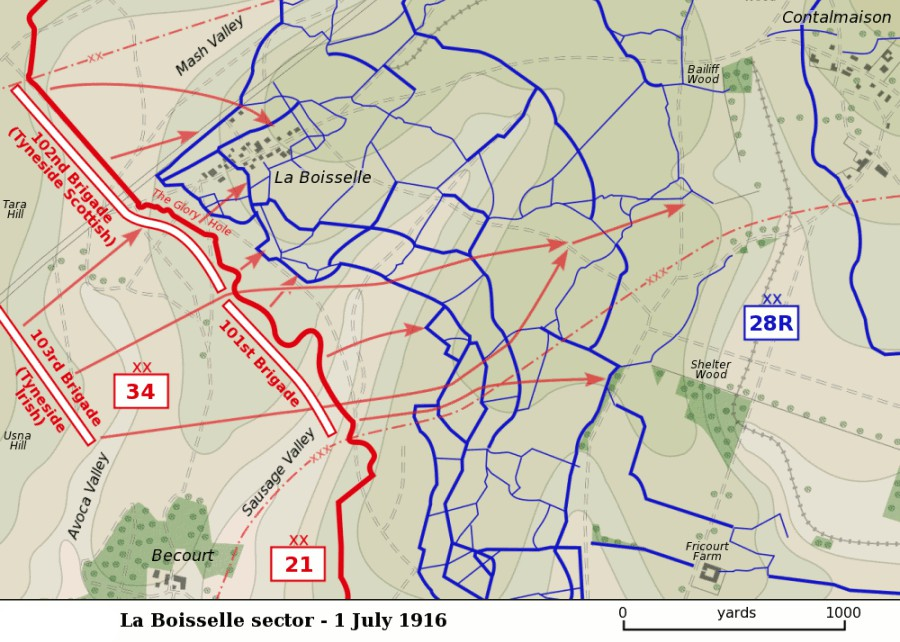
34th Division's attack on Sausage Valley, 1 July 1916.

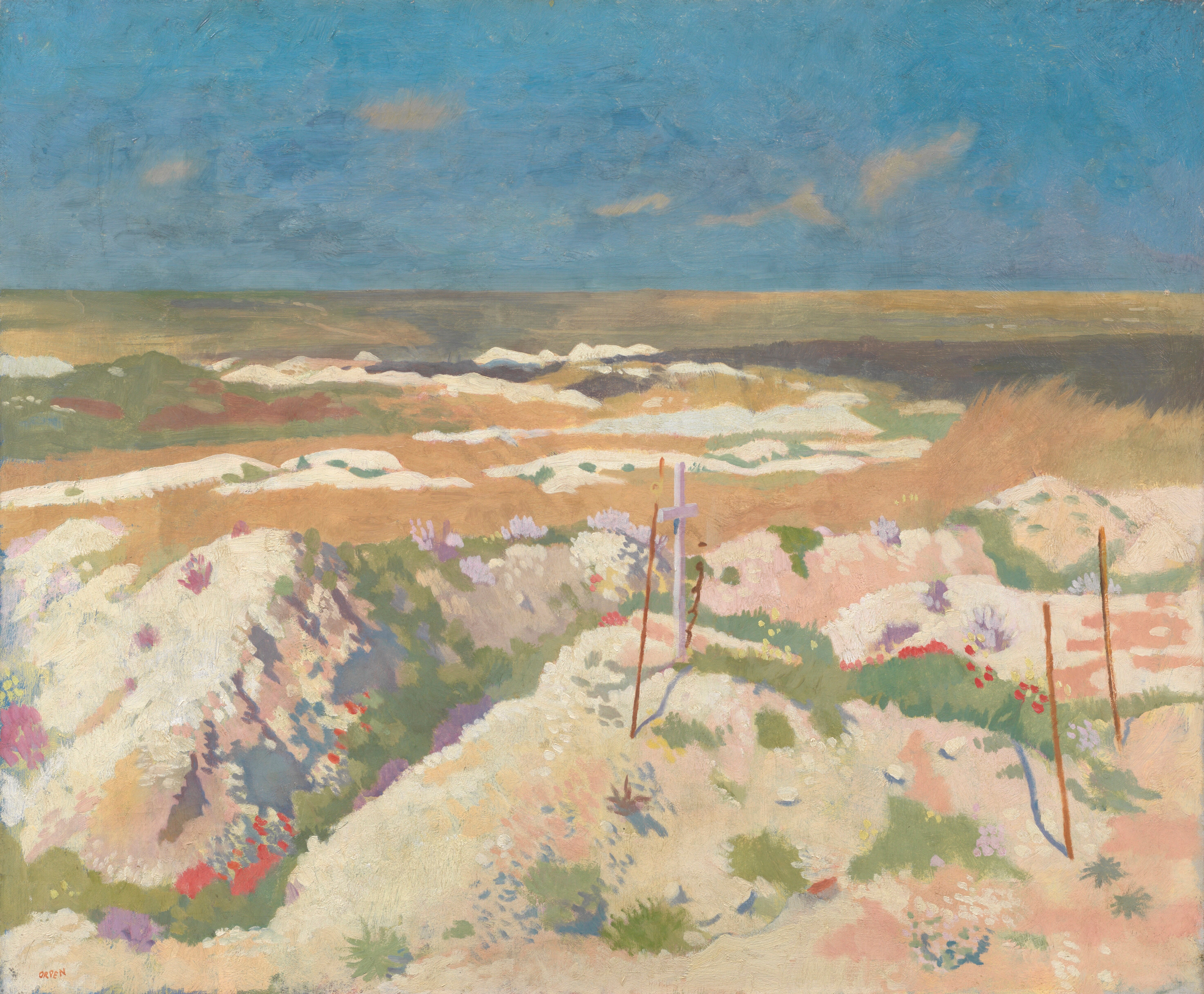
A Grave and a Mine Crater at La Boisselle, by William Orpen.

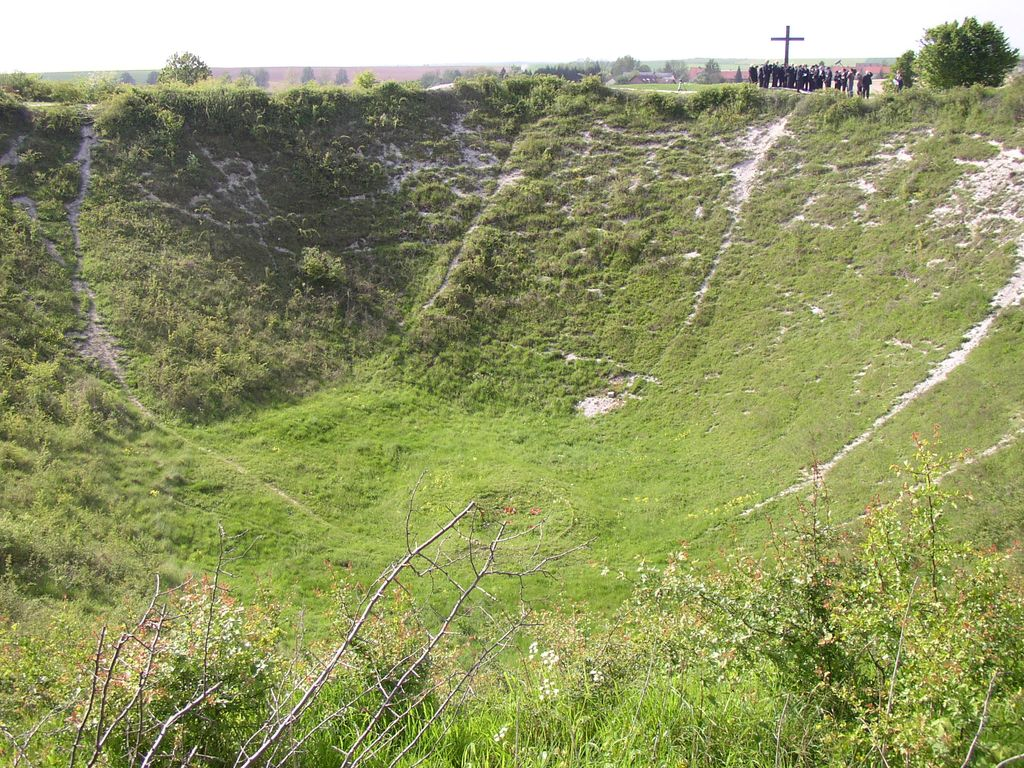
Lochnagar Crater, present day.

The First day on the Somme was the first offensive operation for 34th Division. Attacking on the right of III Corps, its objectives (recognised as being ambitious) were the Capture of La Boisselle situated on a spur, and then an advance of 3,500 yards (3,200 m) almost to Contalmaison, crossing six successive trench lines. The bombardment began on 25 June but bad weather hindered artillery observation so the bombardment was extended by two days and the attack was postponed until 1 July. The battalions moved into their assembly trenches between 05.00 and 07.00 as the artillery began their final bombardment. The plan was for 34th Division to attack with 102nd Bde on the left, 101st on the right, each brigade forming two columns. 102nd Brigade's columns were led by the 21st NF south and 20th NF north of the La Boisselle salient; a special force of 'bombers' from each battalion would turn inwards to clear the village itself. The attacking battalions were to be preceded by a creeping barrage. Each battalion was to advance in four waves, with special parties detailed to 'mop up' the captured trenches, and others to carry up supplies. This first line would be followed by the 22nd NF to the south and 23rd NF to the north. 103rd Brigade, starting from behind the British front line, would then pass through to capture the third objective. The infantry commanders had been dissatisfied with the results of the preliminary bombardment, so a special bombardment of La Boisselle village by Stokes mortars had been laid on, and other mortars laid a smoke screen on the village. Over preceding weeks 179th Tunnelling Company, RE, had placed huge mines under the flanking defences of La Boiselle, the Schwabenhöhe or Schwaben redoubt to the south (the Lochnagar mine), and the 'Y Sap' mine to the north. These mines were fired 2 minutes before Zero, at 07.28, obliterating sections of the German defences and creating very large craters.

At 07.30 the whole infantry of the division went 'over the top', the pipers of the Tyneside Scottish playing their men into action. The leading waves rose from their assembly trenches, the rear waves came down the Tara–Usna ridge behind. The However, the Germans were unsubdued by the bombardment or the mines, and came up from their deep dugouts as soon as the barrage moved off them. Their machine guns and rifles opened up before the British had got half way across the 200–800 yards (180–730 m) of No man's land. Within 10 minutes of Zero, 80 per cent of the leading British battalions were casualties. With the shortest distance to cross, 21st NF managed to overrun the trenches of the Schwabenhöhe and attempted to pass between La Boisselle and the Lochnagar crater, crossing two more trench lines. However, their right flank was exposed by the failure of 101st Bde's column attempting to advance up 'Sausage Valley'. In addition, the bombing parties made no progress into La Boisselle despite the trench mortar bombardment that had continued for 12 minutes beyond Zero. The defenders of the village were able to fire into the left flank of the column. Very heavy casualties were suffered here by 21st NF, by 22nd NF following, and then by the battalion of 103rd Bde. With the bombing party eliminated, and German reinforcements arriving, the group in the third line trench under Major Spencer Acklom of 21st NF were forced to withdraw to the second line and consolidated a position there by 08.00, with another party of men from 101st, 102nd and 103rd Bdes holding onto Lochnagar crater nearby. To the north of La Boisselle, along the side of 'Mash Valley', No man's land was much wider, and even less progress was made. Fired upon from La Boisselle and from Ovillers in the other side of the valley, 21st and 23rd NF were practically wiped out, their casualties strewn across No man's land. Apart from a few individuals, this column fell back to its starting line. During the rest of the day Acklom's party held off six counter-attacks, and by 15.00 the signallers had established a telephone line back to 102nd Bde HQ, by which time Acklom had gathered seven officers and about 200 other ranks (ORs). After dark Acklom established communications with the Lochnagar crater party, and together they improved their position. During the night the remnants of 102nd Bde were joined by 19th (Western) Division, some of them making their way up the tunnel used to dig the Lochnagar mine. Next day, 2 July, 19th (W) Division continued the attack on La Boisselle while Acklom held the crater with his party and some machine guns from 102nd MG Co later joined by some trench mortars. He reported his position secure at the end of 2 July, but his strength was down to five officers and 150 ORs. On 3 July he was able to extend his line rightwards with a mixed party from various battalions while 19th (W) Division completed the capture of La Boisselle. 34th Division was relieved from the line by 23rd Division during the night of 3/4 July.

The 34th Division suffered more infantry casualties than any other division on 1 July 1916, with the Tyneside Scottish Brigade suffering the worst losses of any brigade (the Tyneside Irish Brigade had the next worst):

- 20th NF (1st Tyneside Scottish): 16 officers and 337 ORs killed, 10 officers and 268 ORs wounded; total 631
- 21st NF (2nd Tyneside Scottish): 11 officers and 161 ORs killed, 10 officers and 296 ORs wounded; total 478
- 22nd NF (3rd Tyneside Scottish): 7 officers and 198 ORs killed, 1 officer missing, 14 officers and 319 ORs wounded; total 539
- 23rd NF (4th Tyneside Scottish): 9 officers and 178 ORs killed, 2 officers missing, 7 officers and 444 ORs wounded; total 640
- 102nd MG Co: 1 officer and 6 ORs killed, 5 officers and 24 ORs wounded; total 36

Lieutenant-Col Elphinstone and all the battalion commanders (or acting commanders) of the brigade were among the dead. The 4th Tyneside Scottish had suffered the third-heaviest casualties of any battalion engaged on 1 July.

When the Tyneside Scottish were first raised a request to wear kilts had been refused, though they did wear a Glengarry bonnet in place of the normal Peaked cap. After La Boisselle they were granted the right to wear a 3-inch tartan patch as a backing to their cap badge. One Geordie remarked, 'Man, we'll have to fight a hell of a lot of battles before we get our kilts'.

The casualties among 102nd and 103rd Bdes were so severe that on 6 July they were exchanged for two fresh brigades from 37th Division so that 34th Division could continue the offensive. 102nd and 103rd Brigades were temporarily amalgamated under the command of Brig-Gen Ternan and held the quiet line opposite Monchy-au-Bois and then the more active Vimy Ridge sector while being reinforced.

On 15 August 34th Division left the Somme and marched north to the Armentières sector, where it was rejoined on 22 August by 102nd Bde. It spent the rest of the year routinely holding the line at Bois-Grenier, with regular trench raids.

=== Arras ===
On 26 January 1917 the division was suddenly rushed from Armentières to go into reserve at Méteren in case the Germans attacked over the now-frozen marshes north of Boezinge. This did not happen, but the division underwent three weeks' training there for the forthcoming offensive before moving to the Arras sector to continue preparations. The First Battle of the Scarpe launched the Arras Offensive at 05.30 on 9 April. 34th Division was to assault three successive lines of German trenches, designated the Black, Blue and Brown lines, the Black being 80–150 yards (73–137 m) in front of the start line, the Brown about 500–600 yards (460–550 m) away. The attack by 102nd Bde went well: the defenders were shattered by the barrage (including an overhead machine gun barrage) and most of the survivors wee eager to surrender. 21st and 22nd NF captured the Blue Line on schedule and the advance was continued by 20th NF on the right and 23rd NF on the left. However, the failure of 103rd Bde meant that 24th NF's flank was 'in the air', and the battalion was delayed cutting through barbed wire and lost the protection of the creeping barrage. It had a stiff fight for the German support line, taking it by short rushes and losing 165 men in the process. Both 20th and 23rd NF had to dig in a little short of the final objective (the Green Line). Conditions on the bare uplands were bad, and there were deaths from exposure during the night. Next day 103rd Bde was still held up but 102nd Bde occupied the Green Line without difficulty. As the brigade secured its position over the following days amidst snowstorms it was subjected to heavy shelling. Large numbers of men also had to be evacuated sick because of the bad weather. 102nd Brigade moved back to billets on the night of 14/15 April.

Brigadier-Gen Ternan gave up the command of 102nd Bde and was replaced on 22 April 1917 by the younger Brig-Gen N.H.T. Thomson from the Seaforth Highlanders. The brigade returned to the line while the Second Battle of the Scarpe was being fought. The battalions were still weak after the recent fighting, and many of the replacements were poorly trained. On 25 April 34th Division relieved 51st (Highland) Division in the line, with orders to attack on 28 April (Battle of Arleux). For this operation 102nd Bfde was in divisional reserve, but loaned 20th NF to 101st Bde, which was tasked with attacking the village of Rœux. The assault was delivered at 04.25, and 20th NF took over the British front line once 101st Bde had gone forward. THe attack went badly and by nightfall 101st Bde – including 20th NF – had only 25 officers and 790 men left in the line. XVII Corps and 34th Division decided to make a surprise attack that night with 102nd Bde in an attempt to capture the chemical works at Rœux. 22nd NF would jump off from 103rd Bde's positions in Cawdor Trench and 23rd NF from 101st Bde's Corona Trench. No reconnaissance was possible, and 23rd NF could not get through the crowded communication trenches into position until an hour after the planned Zero hour, Unfortunately, orders to 22nd NF to delay the attack did not reach the battalion in time, and it jumped off as planned at 03.00, quickly ejecting the enemy from Calabar Trench. However, the battalion could make no further progress because the ground ahead was under machine gun fire from three side. 23rd NF, fatigued from its march, attacked at 04.00 up Corona trench, but was also stopped by machine gun fire. 34th Division was now so exhausted that it had to be relieved on 30 April/1 May.

=== Greenland Hill and Hargicourt ===
34th Division spent the rest of May resting and training, with 102nd Bde round Fienvillers. Reinforcements were scarce: consequently battalions of 34th Division were temporarily reduced from four to three companies. 34th Division went back into the line on 30 May, with 102nd Bde in divisional reserve. 102nd Brigade relieved 101st on 4/5 June and carried out an attack to capture some trenches on the slope of Greenland Hill. Although small-scale, this attack was supported by 164 field guns, numerous heavy guns, all three of the division's MG companies and all three TMBs. The assault was made with 20th NF, 21st NF and 22nd NF in line, with 23rd NF in support. Each assaulting battalion had all three companies in line, each in four waves. The first two waves were to capture and mop up the first objective ('Curly' and 'Charlie' trenches), the third and fourth to pass through and take the second objective ('Cod' and 'Cuthbert' trenches). 10th Lincolnshire Regiment from 101st Bde would provide carrying parties, and 103rd Bde would dig a new trench to link up the second objective with the existing front line. Zero was at 20.00, and the barrage crashed down on Curly and Charlie trenches for four minutes and when it lifted the stormers were immediately into the trenches. There was stubborn close-quarters fighting in a few places, but the first objective was cleared with the exception of a small part of 20th NF's area. The third and fourth waves quickly disengaged from the fighting and went on to the second objective close behind the barrage, and established themselves by midnight. At 22.00 the 18th NF (the divisional pioneer battalion) was already digging a communication trench across the old No man's land while the Lincolns carried up supplies and 208th Field Co, RE, helped to form strongpoints in the new front line. The enemy kept up a heavy barrage all night and made several bombing attacks but these were driven off by rifle grenades and rifle fire. The last German outpost in Curly trench was captured by 20th NF at 14.00 next day, supported by trench mortars, but the battalion still had to call down artillery fire to break up an enemy counter-attack that evening. After 55 hours' combat, 102nd Bde was relieved on 8 June.

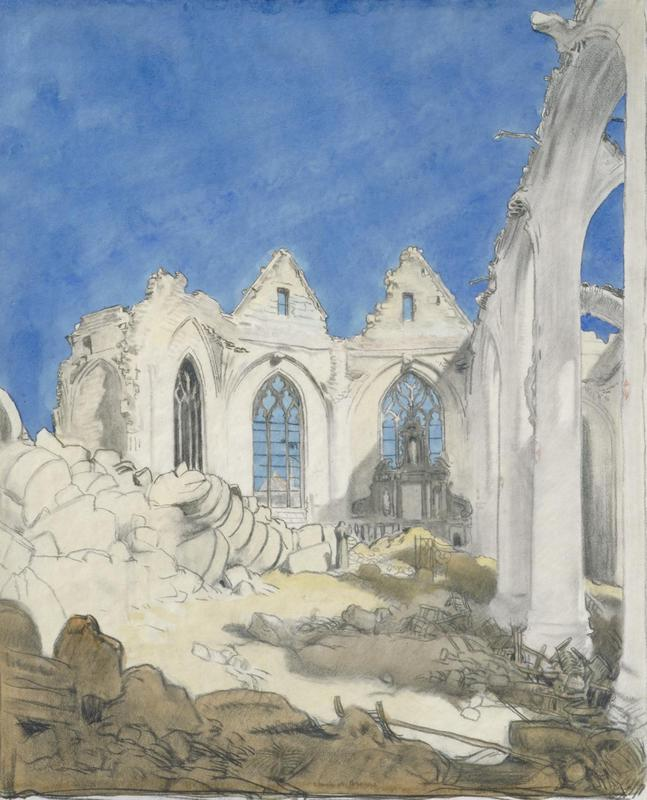
The Church, Péronne, by William Orpen, depicting the destruction carried out by German troops as they retreated to the Hindenburg Line in 1917.

34th Division spent the rest of June refitting and training the replacements it received, but these were not enough to replace all the losses. Then between 8 and 10 July the division moved to Péronne, with 102nd Bde moving into the Hargicourt sector. The area had been devastated by the Germans before they retreated to the Hindenburg Line earlier in the year, and much labour was required to repair roads and erect huts to replace the destroyed buildings. The front line consisted of a chain of posts rather than continuous trenches, and No man's land was unusually wide. At first the TMBs could not reach across No man's land, but they used some captured German 7.7 cm guns instead. Earl on 26 August, 101st Bde carried out a small attack assisted by 20th and 23rd NF from 102nd Bde and two mortars of 102nd TMB. It was a minor operation planned in great detail, one of a number of such attacks being carried out as diversions from that summer's main Ypres Offensive. The objectives were 'Malakoff Farm' and the adjoining trench system on Cologne Ridge in front of Hargicourt, about 2,000 yards (1,800 m) in front of the Hindenburg Line proper. The capture of these positions would reduce German observation over British positions. The attack was carefully rehearsed behind the lines where turf had been cut to represent the enemy trenches. 101st Brigade put all its battalions into the line, with 20th NF in reserve behind a railway embankment, while 23rd NF would send a company bombing up 'Rifle Pit Trench' to link up with the outer flank. Each of 101st Bde's four battalions was also loaned a company from 102nd Bde as a carrying party. The barrage came down at 04.30 on 26 August and lifted after four minutes then began to creep towards the enemy front line, followed by the infantry. 101st Brigade pushed through Malakoff Farm and the bombers of 23rd NF had no difficulty linking up with them. However, the following night 103rd Bde failed to complete the capture of the high ground of Cologne Ridge in front Fire directed from this position made the Hargicourt valley dangerous, so 102nd Bde carried out another small formal attack to complete its capture on 9–11 September. It had been taken out of the line to rehearse for this attack, returning on 7 September. Preparations on 8 September were hampered by enemy artillery fire but promptly at 23.45 21st and 23rd NF were formed up on their jumping off tapes in No man's land, about 350 yards (320 m) from the German trenches. Each battalion had two companies in the front line, each in four waves, the first to cross the first trench ('Farm' trench) and form a screen the other side, the second to mop up, and the third and fourth to consolidate. The other two companies were to carry up barbed wire and string it across the whole front, even if fighting was still going on in the trench. The guns opened up at 00.15 and the assaulting waves followed the creeping barrage. The right company of 21st NF lost direction in the mist, but the rest of the attack went well, the enemy fleeing. Brigadier-Gen Thomson then ordered 21st NF to bomb their way forward to join up with the new position, which was consolidated by 22nd NF, 20th Fd Co and the pioneers of 18th NF. German retaliatory fire was heavy, but the position was held. 21st NF attempted to expand their position that afternoon, but the Germans counter-attacked at the same time, and a confused fight ensued under bombardment by both sides. 102nd Brigade completed the capture of the last lengths of trench on 11 September, then handed a secure position over to 101st Bde and went back into divisional reserve. The brigades total casualties were 290 officers and 374 ORs, mostly caused by shellfire after the assault. 34th Division remained in this sector until the end of the month but there were only patrol actions and raids.

=== Ypres ===
Many of the reinforcements received at the end of September had minimal training, and it was claimed that some of them had never fired their rifles. 34th Division was now transferred north to the Ypres Salient where the offensive was continuing. After arriving on 9 October the division was employed to repair roads so that the advance could continue. 103rd Brigade took over part of the line across the Broembeek valley on 12 October, and was relieved by 102nd Bde on the night of 16/17 October. The troops were now existing in wrecked farms and captured pillboxes linked by duckboard tracks amidst a sea of flooded shellholes. On 19 October 101st Bde relieved the battalions of 102nd Bde in the front line and carried out a preliminary advance (the 'Action of 22 October 1917') north of Poelcapelle to protect the left flank of the projected main attack. A company of 20th NF held the line on the right of 101st Bde, standing fast and keeping the enemy under fire. To its right 102nd Bde attacked with 24th/27th NF borrowed from 103rd Bde. Two companies of 24th/27th NF stood fast, the other two pivoted, to keep touch with 18th (Eastern) Division's attack further right. Unlike, 101st Bde, which suffered badly, 102nd Bde's small operation went well, 24th/27th NF taking all its objectives, including a farm that had been overlooked by 18th (E) Division. The division was withdrawn on 24 October.

=== Winter 1917–18 ===
34th Division spent three months in a quieter sector to the south, then went into reserve in February 1918. By the beginning of 1918 the BEF was suffering a manpower crisis. Brigades were reduced from four to three battalions each, and the remainder were broken up to provide reinforcements for the others. In 34th Division the Tyneside Scottish and Tyneside Irish battalions were amalgamated to form a single 102nd Bde. The 1st and 2nd Tyneside Scottish were disbanded on 3 February and replaced by the 2nd Tyneside Irish from 103rd Bde. At the same time the brigade MG companies were concentrated into a divisional MG battalion. The composition of 102nd Bde therefore was:

- 22nd NF (3rd Tyneside Scottish)
- 23rd NF (4th Tyneside Scottish)
- 25th NF (2nd Tyneside Irish)
- 102nd TMB

=== German spring offensive ===
34th Division returned to the Arras sector in March 1918. The Germans were soon to launch their Spring offensive, and their plans in the Arras area were quite well known. The offensive began at 04.15 on 21 March with a massive bombardment, mainly on 102nd Bde on the division's right and the adjacent 59th (2nd North Midland) Division. The shelling cut telephone lines to the front line battalions and mist shrouded the enemy advance. About 10.00 the enemy broke through 59th (2nd NM) Division's left brigade, forcing back the adjacent company of 22nd NF, which had practised this manoeuvre and sent up signal rockets to inform the artillery that this had been done. A company of 25th NF was sent down from brigade reserve to help form a defensive flank, but the enemy advance was too fast. By noon the whole of 25th NF was trying to form a line facing south; about 14.00 A and B Companies and stragglers from other battalions were lining the railway embankment. However, the rest of the brigade was still in the front line, and Germans moving north were behind the battalion' HQs in a railway cutting in the support line ('Bunhill Row'). A signal party trying to restore communications to the HQs was briefly captured, but got away to warn them. The battalion HQs burned their papers and prepared for all-round defence with C Company of 34th MG Bn. At 17.00 Lt-Col Acklom was killed trying to break out with the HQ party of 22nd NF. The position being hopeless, and surrounded by wounded and gassed men, the other two battalion. commanders surrendered at 17.30, having prevented the Germans from rolling up the support line for hours. The companies in the front trench had fallen back slowly, using each communication trench in turn as a defence line (as 34th Division had planned). Finally a frontal attack on the original front line turned these positions, driving them back until the remnants of 22nd and 23rd NF formed a trench block in the support line at 'Queen's Lane'. This held up the advance for some time with rifle and Lewis gun fire, then about 15.30 they were pushed back until they joined up with the defensive flank formed by 101st Bde along 'Factory Avenue', where the companies of 25th NF had gathered. That night the survivors of 102nd Bde, together with a company of the 18th BF (Pioneers) and J Special Company, RE, were formed into a 500-strong composite battalion under the command of Maj H.S. Neaves, holding the line between the other two brigades. Brigadier-Gen Thomson established 102nd Bde HQ in the Sensée valley behind St Léger.

The following morning also dawned with mist, covering the German advance, which after a whoile succeeded in penetrating between 101st and 102nd Bdes, the 25th NF losing a few men surrounded and captured. 101st Brigade was forced back by heavy artillery fire, opening a wide gap that the 102nd Bde battalion was too small to fill, even with reinforcement from the pioneers of 18th NF and 207th and 209th Field Companies, RE. The enemy kept probing behind its flank, but at 13.30 three companies of 1st East Lancashire Regiment arrived from 103rd Bde. Together they held their own front in the 'Third System' trenches behind Henin Hill, but their left flank was forced further and further back as the enemy pushed through towards St Léger. Another group of men from 22nd and 23rd NF assisted 101st Bde on the other side of this salient. Late in the day 31st Division arrived to relieve 34th Division, which withdrew to the rear areas.

=== Battle of the Lys ===
34th Division was moved north to a quieter area to recuperate, occupying a line in the Houplines sector, in front of Armentières under First Army. The exhausted battalions had to absorb inexperienced reinforcements and improve the neglected defences. Unfortunately, this was the sector chosen for the next phase of the German spring offensive (the Battle of the Lys). It began with heavy mustard gas shelling of Armentières on 7/8 April, the gas drifting across the rear areas of the defences; 34th Division had over 900 gas casualties, mainly among 102nd Bde, the pioneers of 18th NF and sappers of 207th Fd Co, RE. On 8 April the brigade was reinforced by two companies from 15th Royal Scots with 101st Bde in reserve. The bombardment began at 04.00 on 9 April, but the attack did not at first affected 34th Division's front, being concentrated against its neighbours to the south, where it broke through 40th Division. Once again, the division was forced to form a defensive flank to the south, while 102nd Bde remained defending Armentières, with Brigade HQ in an old jute factory by the railway line. That night Houplines was heavily bombarded, but 102nd Bde was not attacked. However, the following afternoon it had to evacuate the town, which was now in a dangerous salient following the breakthrough to the south. The orders arrived at 11.45 and 102nd Bde got away without difficulty, crossing the River Lys by 18.30. After the bridges had been destroyed behind them, the troops of 102nd Bde took up position along the north bank of the river with B Company 34th MG Bn, linking up with Second Army to the north. However, 34th Division was still in a narrow salient around Nieppe, packed with troops from First and Second Armies, and no rations arrived that night. 102nd Brigade's position, supported by several companies of 34th MG Bn, formed the apex of the salient and came under attack at 05.30 on 11 April. The Germans made no attempt to attack the flanks of the salient, so this attack was probably only intended to pin 34th Division in its vulnerable position. A party penetrated into the houses at Pont-de-Nieppe, and when they began expanding outwards 102nd Bde fell back to the Nieppe Switch line, almost all of the rearguard, C Company, 22nd NF, and several MG teams being killed or captured. At 16.30 orders arrived for 34th Division to fall back up the Bailleul road towards Steenwerck. The brigadiers agreed to begin at 19.30, and by 01.00 on 12 April 102nd Bde and 88th Bde of 29th Division were holding a W-shaped front from Steenwerck station to Pont d'Achelles, with RE companies filling the gaps. 34th Division HQ now had six brigades under its command, and with good artillery support they mainly managed to maintain their positions throughout 12–13 April despite heavy onslaughts. 23rd NF held up the enemy on the De Seule–Neuve Eglise road, and 25th BF came up from reserve to help form a line facing north, but the whole battalion HQ staff of 22nd NF became casualties when it was hit by a single enemy shell.Late on 13 April 34th Division ordered them to continue in these positions, but the brigadiers on the spot disagreed, arguing that the pressure of four full German divisions was proving too much and a further stand would result in unnecessary casualties: 102nd and 88th Bdes were almost surrounded. They received permission to continue their preparations for withdrawal, and got away without interference. By now 102nd Bde was so reduced in numbers that it was taken out of the line and reorganised as a composite battalion under Lt-Col H.S. Neaves with a strength of 462 all ranks, 34th MG Bn with 10 guns, and 90 men from the Motor Machine Gun Company. 102nd Composite Bn remained in support during the bitter fighting of 14–15 April. Although Bailleul fell, and 34th Division's weak brigades were once again in the front line on 16 April, in shallow trenches without any wire, the German attack out of the town was crushed by massed artillery and small-arms fire. The fighting then died down on 34th Division's front, and on 21 April it was finally relieved by French troops.

== Reorganised 102nd Brigade ==
Until mid-May 34th Division was engaged in digging new defence lines in the rear (though the men were twice called on to 'stand to' and prepare to defend these positions during the Second Battle of Kemmel and Battle of the Scherpenberg when German breakthroughs of the French line looked possible). After the disasters of the German offensive, the BEF did not have sufficient reinforcements to return all its formations to full strength. The decision was made to reduce some divisions to Training Cadres (TC) to train US troops, with the hope that they could be rebuilt later. 34th Division was one of those selected, its battalions reduced to 10 officers and 45 ORs each, the remainder being posted to other units. On 21 May Brig-Gen E. Hilliam from 15th (Scottish) Division changed places with Brig-Gen Thomson and took command of 102nd Bde. The division also took temporary command of a large number of TCs from other divisions that were being reduced. Over the following weeks the division assisted in training the 28th, 78th and 80th US Divisions, each US brigade HQ being affiliated to a brigade of 34th Division, and each US battalion to a British battalion TC.

Meanwhile reinforcements were being urgently shipped to the Western Front from the Palestine campaign, and on 13 June 34th Division was informed that it would be reconstituted using these units. On 30 June–1 July three Territorial Force battalions from 53rd (Welsh) Division arrived at Proven to reform 102nd Bde:

- 1/4th Bn, Cheshire Regiment
- 1/7th Bn, Cheshire Regiment
- 1/1st Bn, Herefordshire Regiment
- 102nd TMB – reformed 10 July

Of the original battalions of the brigade converted to TCs, 22nd NF joined 16th Division, was reconstituted in England, and later returned to the Western Front for the last weeks of the war; the 23rd and 25th NF remained as TCs with 39th Division and later 197th Bde of 66th Division, preparing US and British troops for frontline service until the end of the war.

=== Soissons ===
As soon as this reorganisation was complete 34th Division was sent to reinforce the French sector of the front. When the Germans launched the last effort of their Spring Offensive on 15 July (the Second Battle of the Marne), the division was diverted and by the evening of 18 July was concentrated round Senlis. The infantry were then moved up by lorry and by 03.00 on 23 July had completed the relief of a French division in the front line. The 34th Division immediately joined in the French counter-attack (the Battle of the Soissonnais and the Ourcq) on 23 July. Two French corps attacked, and 34th Division's role was to link the two. At 07.15 the division was ordered to attack at 07.40. 102nd Brigade on the right received the order and attacked on time, but due to communication problems, 101st Bde on the right was late setting off (08.00) and was stopped in its tracks, while the French brigade on the left did not advance at all. 102nd Brigade advanced alone through high standing corn behind its creeping barrage, with 1/7th Cheshires on the right and 1/1st Herefords left (each with 8 Vickers guns from 34th MG Bn), and made about 1,200 yards (1,100 m) before being stopped by machine gun fire from three directions. It was ordered to consolidate the line it had gained, and remained there until relieved on 28 July. The division immediately moved during the night of 28/29 July to the Bois de la Baillette to attack Beugneux Ridge. For this attack 1/4th Cheshires was in corps reserve, the rest of 102nd Bde in divisional reserve. However, the attack got held up, and the divisional reserve (102nd Bde with an MG company and 2.4th Somerset Light Infantry (SLI)) was called forward to renew the attack. This coincided with a heavy German counter-attack against the French to the left, and the whole Allied line fell back; all three brigades of 34th Division were in line to hold this position. The division renewed its attack on 1 August; 102nd Bde HQ commanded the divisional reserve consisting of 1/7th Cheshires, 2/4th SLI, 34th MG Bn (less two companies) and the three RE companies. The other battalions of 102nd Bde had special tasks on either flank of the division. 1/1st Herefords were intended to capture some high ground to the south of 101st Bde, but could make no progress. 1/4th Cheshires reinforced the north flank of 103rd Bde; this move was successful and the battalion was able to hand over to French troops by 11.00. The enemy slipped away that night, and French troops passed through 34th Division on 2 August to pursue them. After the battle, the division entrained to return to the British front.

=== Hundred Days Offensive ===
The division then returned to British command to participate in the final advance of the Hundred Days Offensive. From 7 to 16 August it was refitting and training. It then went into the line in the Ypres sector on 21 August, with 102nd Bde in reserve. The Allied offensive had begun further south on 8 August, and the enemy had begun to give ground south of Ypres. It was planned that 102nd Bde would be attached to 41st Division to attack and recapture Kemmel Hill, but patrols from 34th Division were able to seize the feature without a formal attack. 102nd Brigade took over from 101st and 103rd Bdes on 2/3 September and 1/7th Cheshires were able to advance the line during the day. Next morning the battalion advanced behind a creeping barrage and by the end of the day 1/7th Cheshires and 1/1st Herefords had reached 'Peckham Farm' and 'Ulster Road' on the slopes of Messines Ridge. The division was then relieved and rested for two weeks.

34th Division attacked on the first day of the Fifth Battle of Ypres on 28 September. The morning attack by 101st and 103rd Bdes consisted of pushing forward strong patrols protected by smoke barrages. The advance continued that night, and by 08.30 next day 1/7th Cheshires were able to pass through and reach the Ypres–Comines Canal. Successful turning movements by neighbouring divisions meant that 34th Division was now squeezed out of the line.

A few days later the division took over holding a section of the line until the Battle of Courtrai on 14 October. 102nd Brigade formed the right of 34th Division's attack, with 1/4th Cheshires on the left, 1/7th Cheshires on the right, and 1/1st Herefords in the rear. The jumping-off line had to be carefully adjusted to conform to the barrage line, but all troops were in position by 04.25. The enemy was active with his artillery from 04.15, particularly gas shelling, and 1/4th Cheshires' battalion HQ was hit twice, with many casualties. The barrage came down at 05.32, then began creeping forwards when the attack began three minutes later. With morning fog, enemy gas, and a smoke barrage fired to mask the village of Geluwe, the visibility was no more than 5 m, and attacking infantry were led by compass, many of them holding the belt of the man at front. Casualties were caused by enemy outposts too far forward to be included in the barrage (the trench mortars had tried to deal with them), but thereafter progress to the first objective, the Black Line 1,500 yards (1,400 m) ahead, was straightforward, and prisoners were taken. After a pause at the Black Line, the attack was resumed at 06.18, with A and B Companies of 1/4th Cheshires making a rapid advance to Coucou and then probing ahead to the Menin Depot and the outskirts of Menin itself. The battalion took numerous prisoners, a field gun, and several machine guns. 1/7th Cheshires also reached the outskirts of Menin. 102nd Brigade consolidated this line (the Blue Line) behind a protective barrage while the remaining pillboxes and outposts were mopped up. Machine gun fire prevented patrols from entering Menin during the night while the enemy destroyed their stores there, but early on 15 October 1/4th Cheshires pushed through the town. Menin was quickly occupied by 102nd Bde, which established posts along the River Lys at the sites of 'Mongrel' and 'Marathon' bridges. 1/1st Herefords crossed over the ruins of Marathon Bridge and patrolled beyond the river on 15/16 June. The following night the brigade was relieved.

From now on, 34th Division operated as brigade groups, each infantry brigade accompanied by a field artillery brigade, an RE company and a company of 34th MG Bn. On 25 October 102nd took the lead for the Action at Ooteghem. Before the main attack, 1/7th Cheshires made a subsidiary attack at 03.00 to secure the crossings of the Bossuit–Courtrai Canal. It was supported by a barrage by all three field brigades of 34th Divisional Artillery and 34th MG Bn. The three companies sent forwards could not cross the canal because of machine gun fire, but A and C cleared Bossuit; B Company at Lock 4 was counter-attacked, losing heavily, but was able to cross at 15.00 when the main attack came abreast of it. The division's main attack was made at 09.05 by 1/4th Cheshires supported by 1/1st Herefords. The barrage was provided by 34th and 41st Divisional Artillery, with smoke barrages to cover the bridging operations and heavy batteries shelling the road and selected targets. Opposition was slight and the canal tunnel was cleared by 09.30 and the village of Moen by 15.00. 1/4th Cheshires then went forward, with 1/1st Herefords protecting its open flank, and as darkness fell it reached its objective at Autryve, close to the River Schelde, liberating Belgian civilians. In this final successful action the brigade's losses were only 87 (including 25 captured at Lock 4) and it took an equal number of prisoners. It was relieved on 27 October and did not take part in the Action at Tiegem on 31 October.

On 3 November 34th Division marched back to the Courtrai area where it was refitting and training in corps reserve when the Armistice with Germany came into force on 11 November 1918.

== Post-Armistice ==
34th Division was selected to form part of the occupation forces in Germany (the British Army of the Rhine, but first it moved to the Lessines area on 17 November to continue training. 'Pivotal' men needed at home such as miners began to be demobilised. It spent 19 December to 17 January 1919 around Namur and then entrained for the Rhine, completing its takeover of the right sector of the Cologne bridgehead on 29 January. In March 34th Division was reconstituted as Eastern Division and 102nd Bde had the following organisation:

- 7th Bn, Cheshire Regiment
- 25th (S) Bn, Northumberland Fusiliers (2nd Tyneside Irish) – reformed from cadre; left April 1919
- 51st (S) Bn, Bedfordshire Regiment
- 52nd (S) Bn, Bedfordshire Regiment
- 53rd (S) Bn, Bedfordshire Regiment – joined April 1919

Eastern Division and its brigades were disbanded in July 1919. 102nd Brigade was not reformed during World War II, although a new Tyneside Scottish was formed in 1939 as a battalion of the Durham Light Infantry, later affiliated to the Black Watch.

== Commanders ==
The following officers commanded 102nd Bde during its existence:

- Brig-Gen R.B. Fell, appointed to original 102nd Bde 29 November 1914
- Brig-Gen T.P.B. Ternan, appointed to 123rd Bde 28 December 1914
- Brig-Gen N.H.T. Thomson, from 22 April 1917
- Brig-Gen E. Hilliam, from 21 May 1918 to Armistice

== Memorials ==
A memorial was dedicated to the fallen of the Tyneside Scottish Brigade at La Boisselle. It was unveiled by Marshal Ferdinand Foch. There are memorials to 34th Division at La Boisselle and at Mont Noir (Zwarteberg) where it fought during the Battle of the Lys.
