= 111th Brigade (United Kingdom) =

Military unit

- Active: 10 December 1914–10 April 1915; 27 April 1915– 25 March 1919
- Allegiance: United Kingdom
- Branch: New Army
- Type: Infantry
- Size: Brigade
- Part of: 37th Division
- Engagements: Battle of the Somme; Battle of the Ancre; Battle of Arras; Third Battle of Ypres; German spring offensive Hundred Days Offensive

Commanders
- Notable commanders: Brig-Gen Reginald Barnes; Brig-Gen Sidney Goodall Francis

111th Brigade (111th Bde) was an infantry formation of the British Army during World War I. It was raised as part of 'Kitchener's Army' and was assigned to the 37th Division. After the original formations were renumbered, the numbers were transferred to a new brigade and division formed from unallocated 'Army Troops'. The brigade landed in France with 37th Division at the end of 1915 and then served on the Western Front for the rest of the war, seeing action at the Somme and the Ancre, at Arras and Ypres, during the German spring offensive and the final Hundred Days Offensive.

== Original 111th Brigade ==
Alfred Leete's recruitment poster for Kitchener's Army.

On 6 August 1914, less than 48 hours after Britain's declaration of war, Parliament sanctioned an increase of 500,000 men for the Regular British Army. The newly appointed Secretary of State for War, Earl Kitchener of Khartoum, issued his famous call to arms: 'Your King and Country Need You', urging the first 100,000 volunteers to come forward. This group of six divisions with supporting arms became known as Kitchener's First New Army, or 'K1'. The K2, K3 and K4 battalions, brigades and divisions followed soon afterwards. The flood of volunteers overwhelmed the ability of the army to absorb and organise them, and by the time the Fifth New Army (K5) was authorised on 10 December 1914, many of the units were already being organised as 'Pals battalions' under the auspices of mayors and corporations of towns up and down the country. The concept of a 'battalion of pals' serving together originated with the 'Stockbrokers Battalion' of the Royal Fusiliers raised in the City of London and was taken up enthusiastically by the Earl of Derby, a former soldier himself. 37th Division of K5 was recruited in Lancashire largely by his efforts; two of his brothers served in the division, and it was known as 'Lord Derby's Own', or more disparagingly as the 'Derby Family Retainers'.

The 37th Division authorised on 10 December 1914 consisted of 110th, 111th and 112th Brigades. 111th Brigade's original infantry units were 'Manchester Pals' battalions, which had been recruited by the Lord Mayor and City of Manchester from 28 August 1914:

- 16th (Service) Battalion, Manchester Regiment (1st City)
- 17th (Service) Battalion, Manchester Regiment (2nd City)
- 18th (Service) Battalion, Manchester Regiment (3rd City)
- 19th (Service) Battalion, Manchester Regiment (4th City)

The brigade carried out its initial training at Heaton Park, but was hampered by the same lack of equipment as the other Kitchener units. In April 1915 the War Office decided to convert the six K4 Divisions (30th–35th) into reserve units to supply reinforcements for the K1–K3 units. The first six K5 divisions (37–42) and their constituent brigades were then given the numbers of the disbanded K4 formations on 27 April 1915. Thus 111th Brigade of 37th Division became the new 90th Brigade in 30th Division. At the same time the 44th Division, formed in March 1915 for the Sixth New Army (K6), took up the vacant position as 37th Division, and its 132nd Brigade was renumbered 111th Brigade.

== New 111th Brigade ==
As authorised in March 1915, 44th (later 37th) Division consisted of 'spare' Kitchener battalions that had originally been assigned as 'Army Troops' for the New Armies (ie they were not assigned to a specific formation), and included the 'Stockbrokers', the original Pals Battalion. Its 132nd (later 111th) Brigade was organised as follows:

- 10th (Service) Battalion, Royal Fusiliers (Stockbrokers) – K2 battalion raised 21 August 1914 by the Lord Mayor and City of London, transferred March 1915 from Army Troops attached to 18th (Eastern) Division
- 13th (Service) Battalion, Royal Fusiliers (RF) – K3 battalion raised at Hounslow Barracks 13 September 1914, transferred March 1915 from Army Troops attached to 21st Division
- 13th (Service) Battalion, King's Royal Rifle Corps (KRRC) – K3 battalion raised at Peninsula Barracks, Winchester, 7 October 1914, transferred April 1915 from Army Troops attached to 21st Division
- 13th (Service) Battalion, Rifle Brigade (RB) – K3 battalion raised at Peninsula Barracks, Winchester, October 1914, transferred April 1915 from Army Troops attached to 21st Division

The brigade assembled around Salisbury Plain, with 10th RF and 13th KRRC at Windmill Hill, 13th RF at Ludgershall, and 13th RB at Andover. By the time they assembled, these battalions had all been in existence for some months and had already overcome the early difficulties of the Kitchener units: lack of uniforms, equipment, weapons and instructors. After three months' intensive training on Salisbury Plain, 37th Division was considered ready to join the British Expeditionary Force (BEF) on the Western Front. Advance parties left on 22 July, embarkation for Boulogne was carried out between 28 and 31 July, and by 2 August the division was concentrated around Tilques, near Saint-Omer.

== Service ==
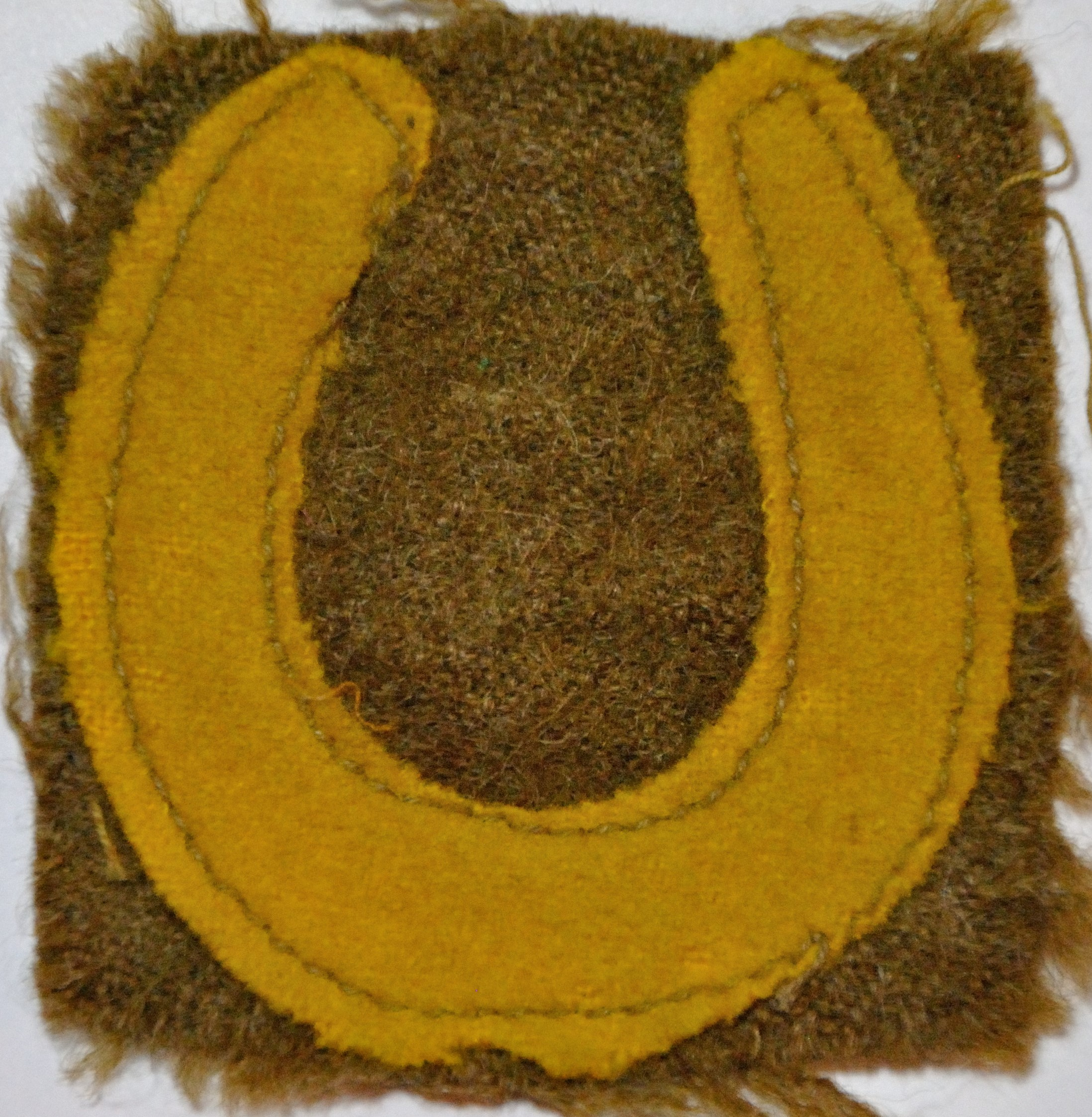
37th Division's 'gold horseshoe' insignia.

On arrival at the front the units of 37th Division were attached to those of 12th (Eastern) Division in the front line for instruction in trench warfare in the quiet sector near Armentières. At the end of August 37th Division entrained for Doullens and then marched to Foncquevillers in the Somme sector, where the BEF was taking over more of the line from French troops. The battalions took turns in the front line, and there was a steady trickle of casualties. From 23 to 27 September during the Battle of Loos the division was stationed at La Cauchie to act as reserve for the French Tenth Army's attack, but then returned to Foncquevillers and began alternating periods of trench holding with billets in Souastre through the autumn and winter. This routine continued until the end of January 1916, the trenches often being flooded during the winter. The battalions carried out a number of trench raids

In February the brigade went back into the line, taking over from the French some trenches at Le Gastineau, a few miles north of the Gommecourt Salient. It was quiet sector, apart from occasional artillery bombardments and raids. On 19 March 41st Division was withdrawn and marched back to the Doullens area to undergo a month's training. It then returned to billets in Humbercamps, just behind the line, where the usual working parties were supplied to the Royal Engineers (REs) until it took over the line again on 1 May.

At this time 111th Bde was joined by its auxiliary units:

- 111th Brigade Machine Gun (MG) Company, Machine Gun Corps – disembarked at Le Havre 25 February 1916 and joined 4 March
- 111th Trench Mortar Battery (TMB) – formed within the brigade as 111/1 and 111/2 by 3 May; combined into a single battery by 2 July; personnel seconded from the infantry battalions; equipped with 3-inch Stokes mortars

=== Somme ===
By June 1916 111th Bde had been in France almost a year and had still not participated in any major action, but the BEF was now preparing for that summer's 'Big Push' (the Battle of the Somme). The artillery bombardment began on 23 June and the assault was launched on 1 July. Initially, 37th Division was not involved. Then 111th Brigade was attached to 34th Division from 7 July as a temporary replacement for a brigade that had been shattered on the First day on the Somme. The fresh troops were immediately rushed to the front to assist with carrying and working parties. The trenches were exposed and badly battered by shellfire and the battalions suffered a steady toll of casualties. 13th RF was immediately assigned to an attack between Ovillers and Contalmaison. It was warned not to attack until ordered to do so, or until the flanking attacks were well ahead. By 08.25 the battalion had lost touch with brigade HQ, but the flanks had advanced so it moved forward out of touch with HQ or neighbours. It encountered little opposition and gained nearly 1,000 yards (910 m) to its objective. Next day the battalion was ordered to push on to the next line west of Contalmaison. In two days the battalion had pushed the line forward materially, captured a battery of field artillery, several machine guns and nearly 200 prisoners for casualties that were moderate by the standards of the Somme. 13th RB next went into action, attacking towards Pozières at 20.45 on 10 July after only 30 minutes' notice. It went 'over the top' into a storm of shrapnel shells and machine gun bullets, with the lines rapidly thinning. The leading companies got into the third line of enemy trenches opposite, but as the CO followed with the two support companies he received a message that the attack had been cancelled. He had to order his men to withdraw to their own trench through the curtain of enemy fire. The battalion lost roughly half its strength. It was relieved in the front line next morning by two companies of 10th RF. 111th Bde HQ, 13th KRRC and 10th RF now took over the left sector of 34th Division's front due east of La Boisselle.

The Battle of Bazentin Ridge was launched before dawn on 14 July: 112th Bde attacked Pozières at 08.30 the following morning (15 July), supported by 111th Bde advancing up 'Sausage Valley' The leading waves of 112th Bde were held up 400 yards (370 m) short of Pozières by machine gun fire and the valley became full of bunched up battalions, which began to fall back to the cover of a sunken road. 10th RF gave new impetus to 112th Bde's attack but although fighting went on round the village all day it was not taken and the attacking brigades fell back to the remaining trenches. On 31 July 10th RF went up in support of 101st Bde which attacked on 3 August as part of the Battle of Pozières Ridge; this attack was a failure. 111th Brigade spent early August digging and wiring new trenches in the High Wood area, suffering casualties from enemy shellfire. until it was relieved on 18 August. 111th and 112th Bdes rejoined their own division on 22 August. 37th Division moved to the Calonne sector, where it trained and held the line among the coal tips until the autumn.

=== Ancre ===
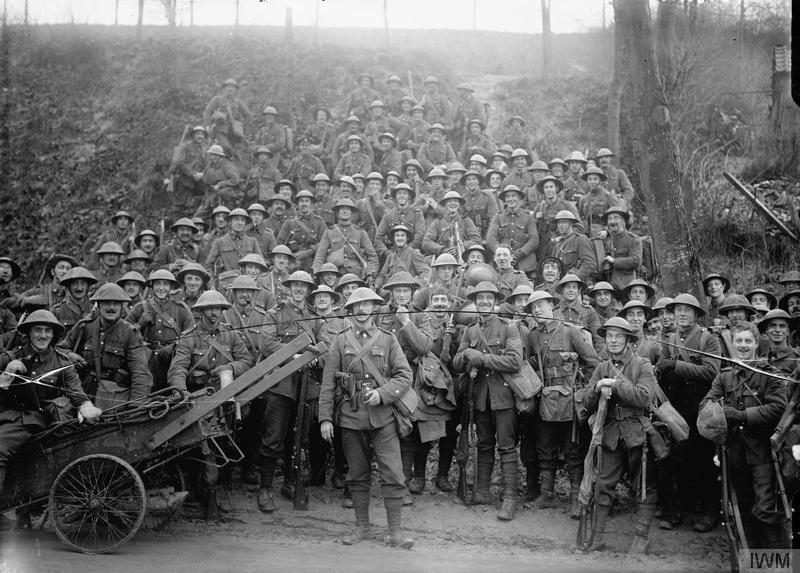
Troops of 10th Royal Fusiliers resting near St Pol on the march up to the trenches in November 1916.

On 17 October 37th Division marched back to the Somme, arriving at Puchevillers behind Albert on 22 October. Training here and at Hem-Hardinval was restricted by bad weather and the need to clear muddy roads. On 13 November 111th Bde moved up to the line and came under the command of 63rd (Royal Naval) Division for the Battle of the Ancre. Next day 10th RF advanced with the support of a tank to mop up a German redoubt that 63rd (RN) Division had bypassed the day before. It captured 270 Germans and released 60 British prisoners without a shot being fired, the tank terrifying the defenders. 13th RF and 13th RB then pushed on behind a Creeping barrage towards Beaucourt and the objective of 'Muck Trench' (so named from its muddy condition). After hard fighting the brigade achieved its objective by next morning but casualties were heavy. 37th Division took over command of the operations in this sector on 15 November. On 18 and 19 November 111th Bde attempted to get forward to a group of trenches known as the 'Triangle', but was driven back by rifle fire. It was relieved from Muck Trench that night and returned to Puchevillers.

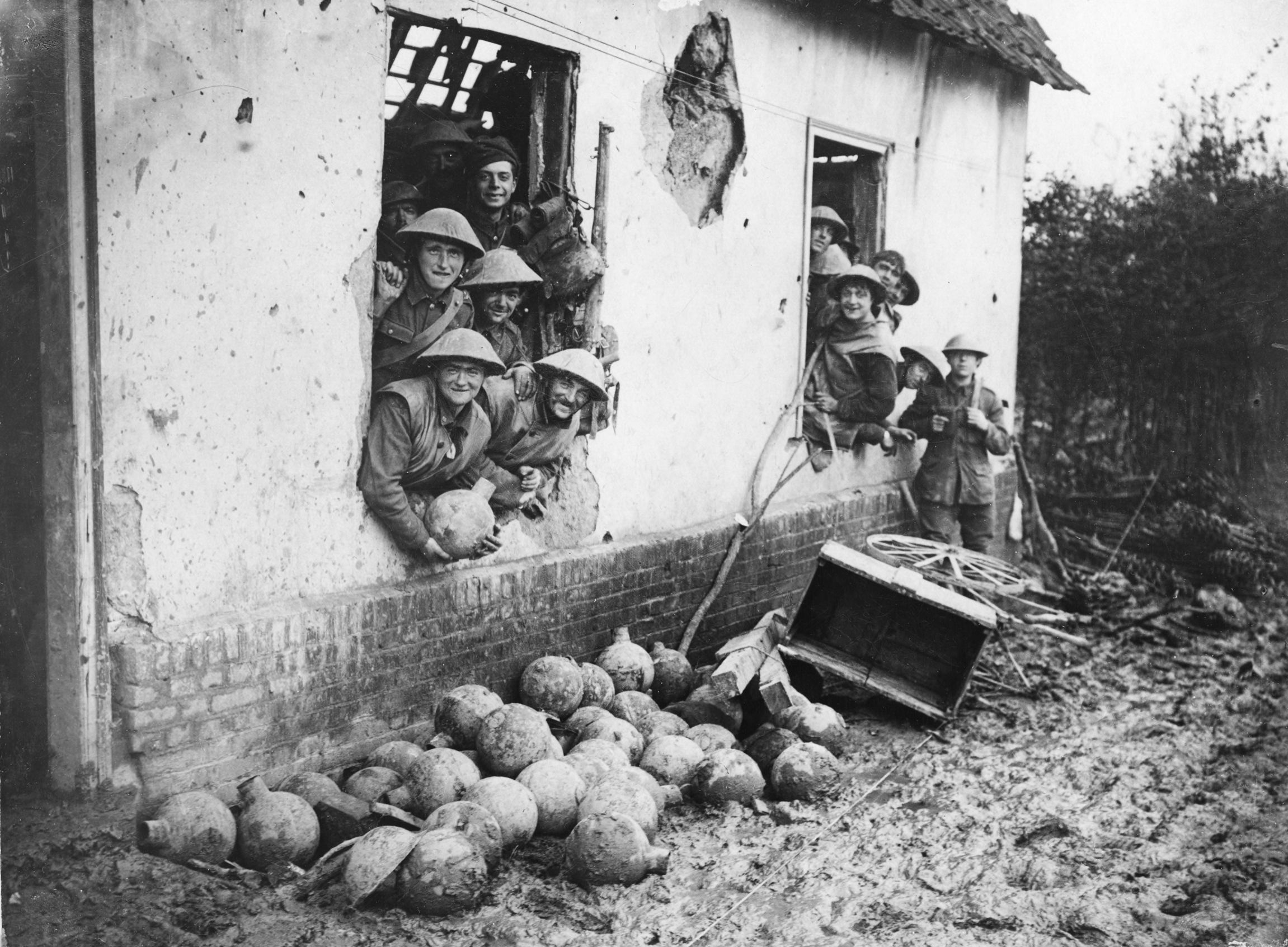
Men of 111th Brigade with trench mortar bombs at Beaumont-Hamel, France, late 1916.

37th Division marched northwards on 13 December, arriving in the trenches of the Neuve-Chapelle sector on 21 December. Here the battalions of 111th Bde began a routine of alternating trench duty with each other. The defences in this flooded sector consisted of breastworks rather than trenches, with a series of sentry posts connected by barbed wire. Meanwhile, the recent reinforcements were trained at nearby Calonne-sur-la-Lys. In early February the brigade shifted to the Hulluch sector, and in early March it marched to the divisional training area at Roëllecourt, west of Arras, where it trained in snowy weather for the forthcoming Battle of Arras.

=== Arras ===
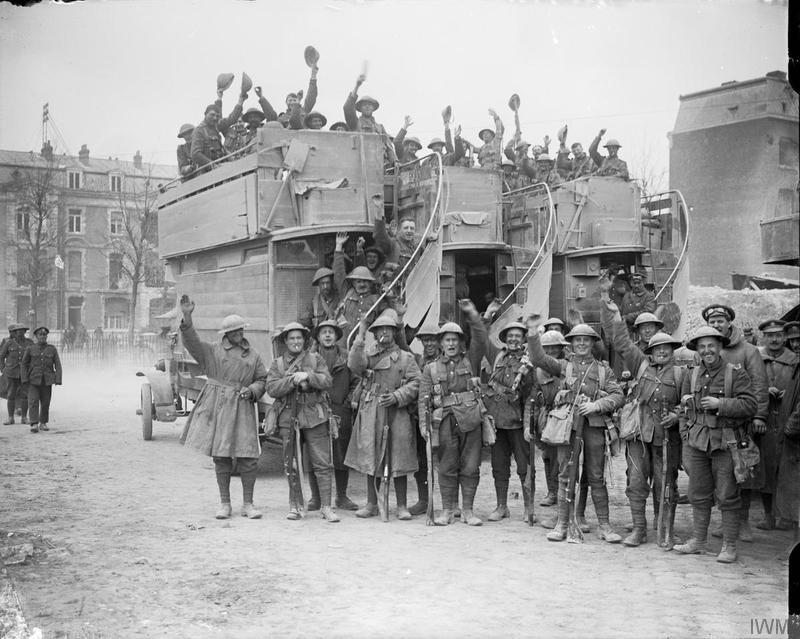
Men of 37th Division boarding London buses after coming out of the line following the capture of Monchy-le-Preux.

111th Brigade's (and Third Army's) objective for this attack was the village of Monchy-le-Preux on the high ground above the River Scarpe, and the operation was carefully rehearsed. The attack was to begin on 9 April after four days of bombardment, with the assaulting formations taking a succession of objectives, the Black, Blue and Brown lines. The fresh 37th Division waiting in the Arras suburbs would then pass through to capture the final (Green Line) objective, just beyond Monchy, but it was unclear whether this could be tackled on the first day. The assault went in at 05.30 and at 12.00 111th and 112th Bdes were ordered up to the Black Line. Then at 15.00 111th Bde followed 12th (Eastern) and 15th (Scottish) Divisions up Battery Valley, believing the Wancourt–Feuchy trenches (the Brown Line) to have already been captured. However, the brigade came under heavy machine gun fire from these trenches, and became mixed up with 12th (E) Division. At the time 37th Divisional Signal Company was unable to locate 111th Bde HQ and the brigade could not be redirected towards 15th (S) Division's more promising advance. Shortly after 18.30 15th (S) Division reported the Brown Line secured, and 111th Bde finally attacked across fresh snow as darkness approached. By now the enemy had recovered from the initial shock of the assault, and the British field artillery was still moving up and could provide little support. 111th Brigade was held up by uncut barbed wire and its supporting tank broke down; the opportunity to seize Monchy on the first day was lost. During the night the troops of 111th and 112th Bdes were disentangled from those of 12th (E) Division, but an attack by 10th and 13th RF failed to reach Monchy and they had to fall back and dig in about 500 yards (460 m) short of the village. An erroneous report that they were in Monchy led to the British cavalry being brought up to exploit a breakthrough, but they achieved nothing. The brigade tried again at 05.00 on 11 April, this time led by 13th RB and 13th KRRC with four tanks in support to suppress the machine guns. Progress up the slope was slow and casualties heavy, but the two battalions finally made their way to Monchy, followed by 10th RF, who stormed into the village itself about 11.00. The official historian described the capture of Monchy-le-Preux as 'one of the outstanding feats of the whole battle'. Although the remnant of 111th Bde was now weak, with very few officers, it was assisted in consolidating the village (in a snowstorm) by 63rd Bde of 37th Division and the cavalry.

111th Brigade returned to the front on 19 April in time for the Second Battle of the Scarpe, opening on 22 April. At Zero (04.45) the brigade attacked toward Gavrelle behind a Creeping barrage, with three battalions in line and 13th RB in reserve. While the brigade took its first and second objectives, 13th RB had to follow through a barrage of German heavy artillery, and the leading companies lost all their officers, some of the Lewis gun teams advancing with 63rd Bde by mistake. What was left of 13th RB then covered the open right flank of 13th KRRC as it consolidated the final objective along the sunken Plouvain–Gavrelle road. The enemy bombarded the position heavily, but 111th Bde strengthened it over the following days. At 04.25 next morning 111th Bde carried out the next assault, on the 'Whip Crossroads' south-east of Gavrelle, with 13th RB on the left and 13th RF on the right. By about 07.00 the objectives had been taken, the only part of the Battle of Arleux (or Gavrelle) that went to plan. The battalions were relieved early in the morning of 30 April.

=== Ypres ===
Over the following weeks the brigade alternately trained and held the trenches in the Arras sector. On 30 May 13th RB it was ordered to make a demonstration in conjunction with a neighbouring division, which proved costly for the battalion. On 23 June the brigade began a march north to the Ypres Salient. 37th Division was now in Second Army for the forthcoming Third Battle of Ypres. It went into the line south of Wytschaete at the end of June, providing working parties and suffering the usual shellfire. It spent the middle of July behind the lines training for the attack, then re-entered the line. The offensive began with the Battle of Pilckem Ridge on 31 July, in which Second Army played a minor role, advancing its line slightly, with 111th Bde supporting 63rd Bde. Later, 13th RB carried out a successful night raid, and on 6 August its patrols established observation posts in front of the line; the division was relieved that evening, then spent three more weeks training.

After 3 September the brigade did further tours of duty in the front and reserve lines and provided working parties, suffering some casualties from Mustard gas shelling and raids. The Germans put in several more attacks on 1 and 3 October to disrupt preparations for the Battle of Broodseinde planned for 4 October, and continued heavy shelling, which caused serious casualties. 111th Brigade's role in the battle was to form a defensive flank, with 13th RF swinging forward to seize some dugouts across the north of Gheluvelt Wood, supported by 13th KRRC and 10th RF. 13th RF followed its creeping barrage so closely that it avoided the prompt German counter-barrage. However, there was rifle and machine gun fire from a blockhouse and 'Lewis House' on the right, which had escaped the bombardment. 13th KRRC could do nothing against Lewis House, and as 13th RF swung forward it came more and more under its fire and had to dig in short of the objective. The battalions were then employed in roadmaking until going into rest billets near Hazebrouck on 26 October.

=== Winter 1917–18 ===
Although it spent the rest of the year in and out of the line in the Salient, 111th Bde was not engaged in any further attacks during the Ypres offensive, though it did carry out raids. By early 1918 the BEF was suffering a manpower crisis, and infantry brigades were reduced from four to three battalions each, many of the surplus units being disbanded to provide reinforcements to the remainder. This did not affect any of the battalions of 111th Bde, but three were disbanded from 112th Bde, and 13th RF was transferred on 4 February to help rebuild that formation. At the same time the brigades lost their MG companies, which were combined into a divisional MG battalion.

On 6 March 13 RB captured a prisoner who warned of an impending attack. It came at 06.30 on 8 March, when 13th KRRC was in the front line and 10th RF in support. The Germans shelled the trenches heavily, attacking and entering them about 14.00. Lieutenant-Col J.D. Waters (10th RF) took command of the brigade sector, and the two battalions' HQ details became involved in the fighting. 111th Bde then counter-attacked, 13th RB as support battalion carrying up ammunition and boxes of bombs, and the position was restored by next morning.

=== Spring Offensive ===
The Germans launched their Spring Offensive against Third and Fifth Armies on 21 March, achieving a near-breakthrough. Although heavily shelled, Second Army was not attacked and quickly despatched reinforcements south to help stem the enemy advance. 37th Division was sent by rail on 28 March, arriving at Hébuterne next day and beginning to take over part of the line near Gommecourt on 31 March/1 April. 37th Division came under attack on 5 April, on the final day of the offensive (the Battle of the Ancre), but the enemy attack was forestalled by 63rd Bde's attempt to recover Rossignol Wood with tank and artillery support. There was some confusion on 111th Bde's front, but the German attackers were soon bombed back out of the British trenches.

Although the first German offensive had ended in this sector, intermittent shelling, raiding, and bombing by aircraft continued throughout April and May. 111th Brigade took up positions at Bucquoy and Ablainzevelle on 24 April. The line occupied after the fighting had died down was poor for observation, and headquarters ordered 13th RB to carry out a minor operation to improve matters. This resulted in heavy fighting and the attempt was abandoned. On 11 May 10th RF at Foncquevillers was subjected to a saturation bombardment with high explosive and gas shells; most of Battalion HQ and hundreds of men were put out of action. After it was relieved there were rumours that the shattered 10th RF would be broken up, but the divisional commander disagreed and arranged for reinforcements to be drafted to it.

The battalions spent most of June refitting and training while in Corps Reserve in the Purple Line, or supporting French troops. In August they returned to the line in front of Bucquoy and Ablainzevelle, bivouacking at Souastre when not in the front line, though they were subject to night bombing attacks.

=== Hundred Days Offensive ===
The Allies launched their rolling Hundred Days Offensive on 8 August. On 19 August 37th Division moved up to take part in a dawn attack next day at Ablainzevelle. At 04.55 the creeping barrage began, and 111th Bde advancing through dense mist had little difficulty achieving its objectives. Two days later 37th Division attacked again at Achiet-le-Grand and Bihucourt. 111th Bde advanced at 11.00 with 13th KRRC and 13th RB in line, supported by tanks, then 10th RF passed through at 13.20 behind a fresh hour-long barrage and took Bihucourt despite strong opposition and an open flank where a neighbouring battalion had not kept up. The village suffered heavy gas shelling that night, but the garrison was stationed outside and only lost a few casualties. The German line now formed an acute salient, and at 04.00 on 24 August 13th RB was ordered to straighten this out by occupying the high ground north-east of Bihucourt. By 07.00 next morning this had been completed and the battalion was patrolling towards Favreuil to get in touch with the New Zealand Division which was attacking that village. By the evening the New Zealanders had still not captured Favreuil, so 111th Bde was ordered to assist them. Zero was set for 18.30 and the whole brigade was to attack. Just as the battalions were moving into their assembly area the Germans put down a barrage in front of the village and on the valley up which they were to advance; it was suspected that the divisional telegraph message ordering the attack had been intercepted. Nonetheless, the attack started punctually. Simultaneously, a large German force emerged from the village to counter-attack: the two forces met half-way and after a close-quarters fight the Germans gave up, some 400 surrendering. Although 13th KRRC was held up short of the village, 13th RB quickly entered the southern end and pushed through until it reached its objective, a trench 150 yards (140 m) east of the village. 13th KRRC and 10th RF formed a defensive flank, and after dark patrols from all three battalions cleared the northern half of the village. The brigade was relieved on the morning of 26 August and went back to huts in Logeast Wood where it remained until 3 September.

Following a period of training, 37th Division moved up to Havrincourt Wood for its next attack (the Battle of Havrincourt). After a day of reconnaissance, 111th Brigade led the division's assault on the Trescault Spur on 12 September. During the night the brigade had managed to establish outposts at the edge of the wood, despite enemy gas shelling, and jumped off from this line at 05.25, 13th RB on the right, 13th KRRC on the left, with 10th RF in support. The village of Trescault beneath the spur and a strongpoint east of it which were obstinately defended, but these were suppressed by crossfire, and by 09.00 the third objective had also been secured. The rest of the day was quiet, until the expected German counter-attack came at 18.00, preceded by a heavy bombardment. About 50 Germans advanced up 'Queen's Lane' and forced their way into 'Shaftesbury Avenue' about 1,300 yards (1,200 m) east of the village. They succeeded in destroying the 13th RB/13th KRRC liaison post at the junction of those trenches, but 13th KRRC counter-attacked and drove the intruders back towards 13th RB, and most of them were captured or killed in the crossfire or by the SOS barrage called down from the artillery. The enemy kept up a persistent bombardment, and next evening repeated the counter-attack of the previous day: a few got into 13th RB's trench but were thrown out and shot down when they became entangled in the wire.

The Allies carried out a series of coordinated attacks along the Western Front on 26–29 September, including an assault crossing of part of the Canal du Nord. On 30 September 111th Bde found that the German bridgehead at Banteux had been abandoned, and closed up to form an outpost line along the bank of the Escaut Canal. Attempts to push patrols across the canal were repelled, but on 5 October the enemy retreated and 13th KRRC and 13th RB crossed, pushing forward until they reached the enemy's Beaurevoir Line. The division assaulted this line as part of the Battle of Cambrai on 8 October. The guns opened up at 04.30 and at 05.10 the barrage started creeping forward, followed by the infantry. 37th Division gained all its objectives, and its advance now became a pursuit of the beaten enemy to the River Selle, but 111th Bde was withdrawn for rest at Bapaume.

The brigade was back in the line on 23 October for the second day of the BEF's next set-piece attack, the Battle of the Selle. After 5th Division had taken the first three objectives, including the village of Beaurain, 37th Division was to assemble 111th Bde behind a smoke barrage and then send it through at 08.00. The Germans defended Beaurain tenaciously, and 111th Bde's move was postponed. When it went forward at 10.00, with 13th KRRC and 13th RB in the lead, it reached its objective by 14.30 and patrols found Neuville and the railway embankment clear of the enemy as far as the River St George. Brigadier Francis held a battalion commanders' conference and decided to resume the advance at 17.15 from the river with an artillery barrage, but the companies were still closing up to the river when the barrage moved on from the far bank, and there was still strong opposition from the railway away to the right, which was holding up the neighbouring formation. The battalions could do little except form a defensive flank. The brigade made a few minor advances during the night to prepare a jumping off line from which 112th Bde continued the advance next morning. 111th Brigade went back to Neuville, then spent 10 days in 'very bad' billets at Beaurain.

The brigade was brought forward on the night of 3/4 November for the next operation, part of the Battle of the Sambre. 13th KRRC and 13th RB launched the assault at 05.30 and reached the Blue Line objective, where they mopped up the strongpoints. Heavy mist ruled out visual communication, and the runners had trouble getting through the barrages that the Germans laid behind the attacking battalions, but 10th RF passed through 13th KRRC to continue the attack through Louvignies and the brigade was on its final objective, the Blue Dotted Line, by 20.00. It was 111th Brigade's last battle.

Early on 5 November 5th Division passed through and took over from the 37th, which concentrated south of Le Quesnoy. On 11 November the division moved to Caudry, and during the march the men were told that the Armistice with Germany had come into force at 11.00, bringing hostilities to an end.

=== Post-Armistice ===
The units of 37th Division were now employed in training, education and recreation. On 1 December it began a long move to an area north of Charleroi, but during bad weather from 2 to 14 December it was billeted north of Le Quesnoy until the march could resume. On 20 December it settled into its final billets. Duties included guarding the supply railhead at Rœux. Demobilisation began in late December and continued in the new year. 37th Division and its brigades ceased to exist on 25 March.

111th Brigade was not reformed during World War II.

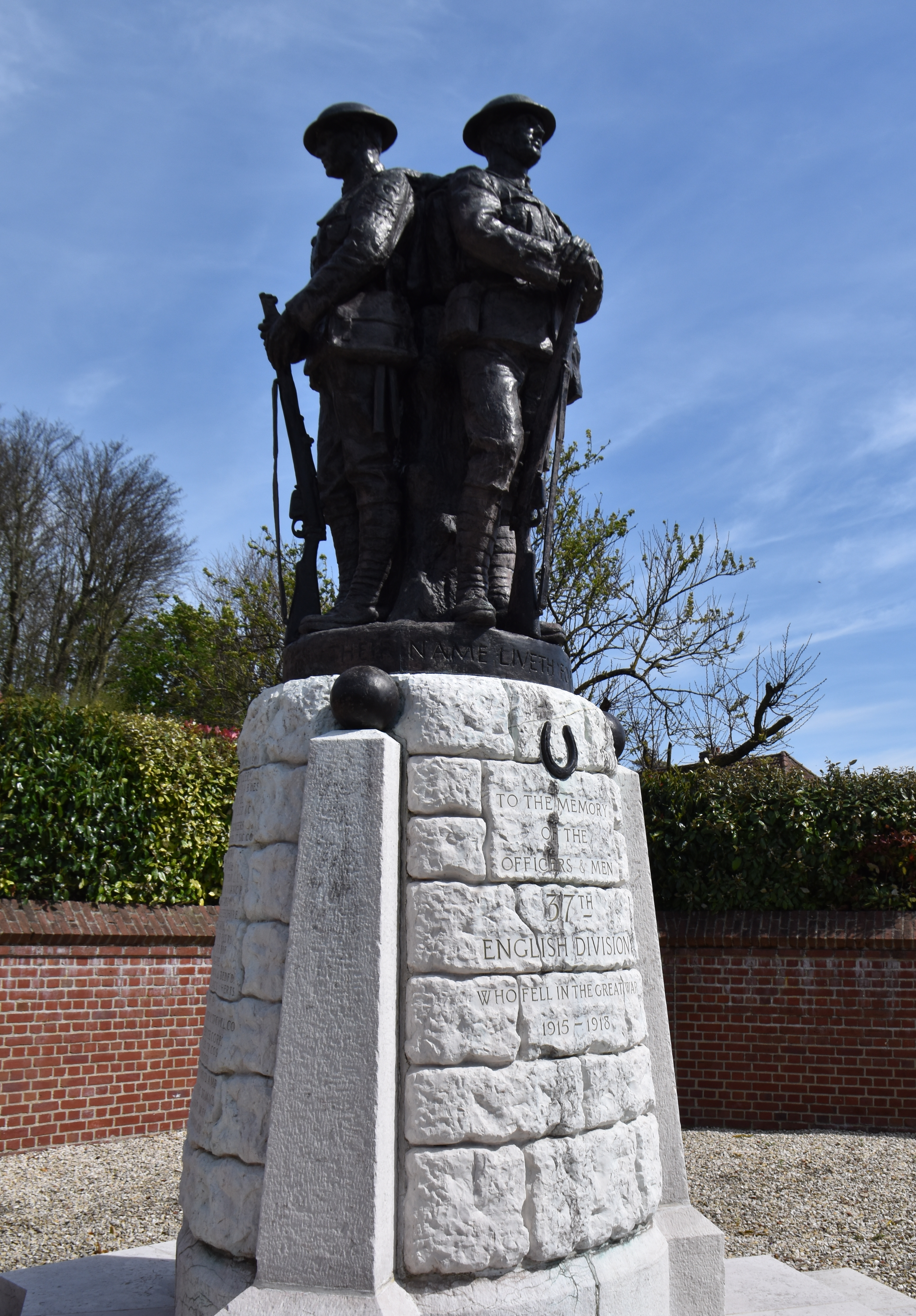
Monument to the 37th Division at Monchy-le-Preux.

== Commanders ==
The following officers commanded 111th Bde:

- Brigadier-General H.C.E. Westropp, appointed to original 111th Bde 30 December 1914
- Brig-Gen Reginald Barnes, appointed to original 132nd Bde 9 April 1915
- Lt-Col W.W. Seymour, acting from 22 November 1916
- Brig-Gen C.W. Compton, appointed 26 November 1916
- Brig-Gen Sidney Goodall Francis, appointed 19 October 1917

== Memorials ==
37th Division's memorial is at Monchy-le-Preux, scene of its greatest success. It was sculpted by Lady Feodora Gleichen, sister of the divisional commander, Maj-Gen Lord Edward Gleichen.

== Insignia ==
37th Division's formation sign was originally a gold horseshoe pointing downwards; in November 1916 this was changed to point upwards. In 1916 the Division adopted a system of 'battle patches' on the upper arm to identify individual units and subunits. These were based on colours to identify brigades (111th Bde's signs were blue), geometric shapes for battalions, and horizontal stripes to indicate companies. These were worn on both sleeves. From late Summer 1917 or early 1918 the gold horseshoe was worn above the other flashes. In 1917 these flashes were:

Top row, left to right: 10th, 13th Royal Fusiliers, 13th KRRC, 13th Rifle Brigade; bottom row: 111th MG Company and 111th TMB.

* 10th RF: a circle below the company stripe

- 13th RF: a horizontal rectangle above the company stripe
- 13th KRRC: a square below the company stripe worn on the base of the shoulder strap
- 13th RB: an equilateral triangle below the company stripe
- 111th MG Company: a diagonal cross above the divisional badge
- 111th TMB: a shell shape below the divisional badge
  For each battalion the company stripes were: red for A Company, dark blue for B, purple for C and green for D.
