= 13th (Service) Battalion, King's Royal Rifle Corps =

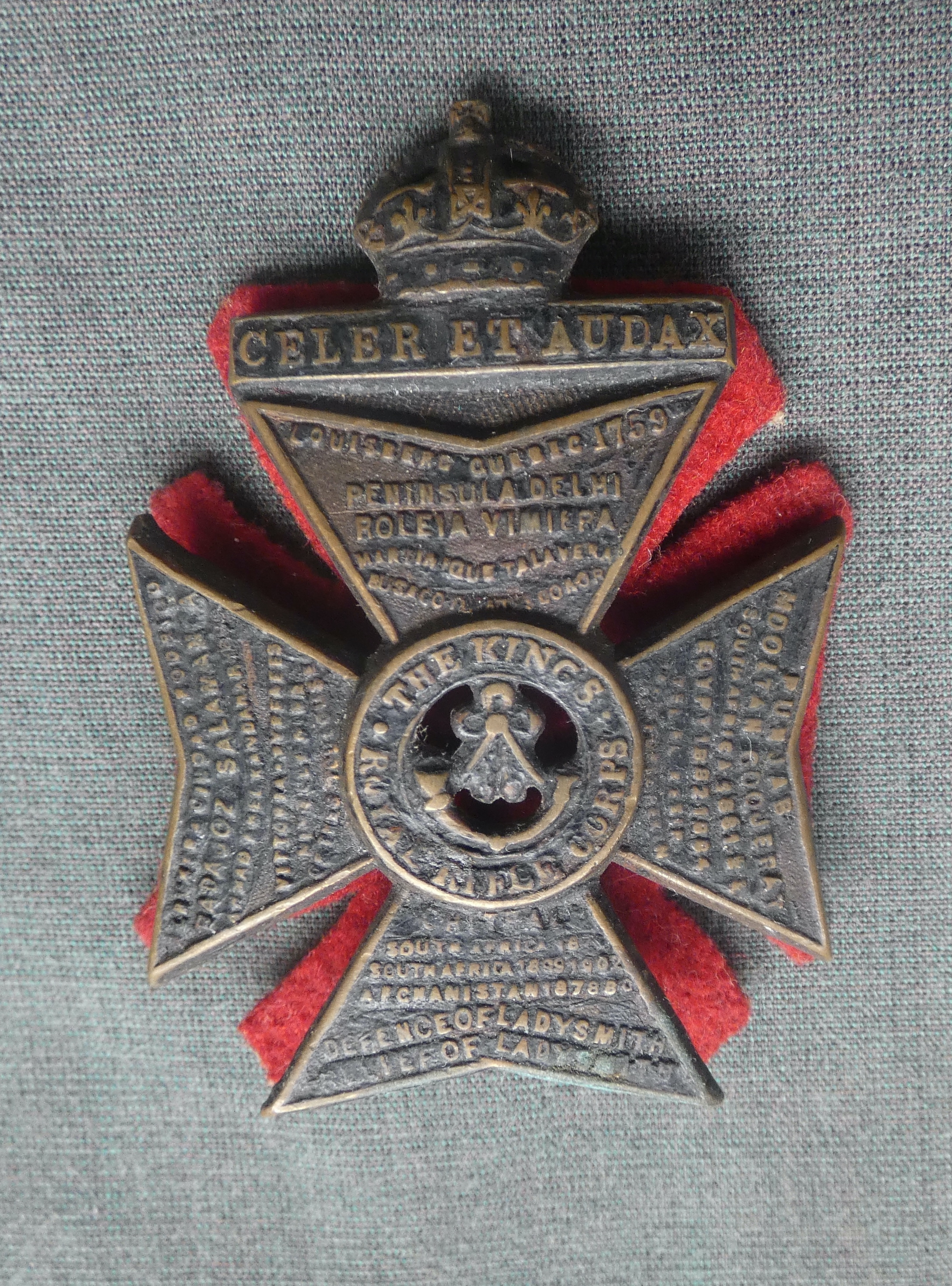
- Cap badge of the King's Royal Rifle Corps
- Active: 7 October 1914–20 February 1920
- Allegiance: United Kingdom
- Branch: New Army
- Role: Infantry
- Size: One Battalion
- Part of: 37th Division
- Engagements: Battle of the Somme; Battle of the Ancre; Battle of Arras; Third Battle of Ypres; German spring offensive Hundred Days Offensive

Commanders
- Notable commanders: Lt-Col Arnold Strode-Jackson

The 13th (Service) Battalion, King's Royal Rifle Corps, (13th KRRC) was an infantry unit recruited as part of 'Kitchener's Army' in World War I. It served on the Western Front from July 1915 until the Armistice, seeing action at the Somme and the Ancre, at Arras and Ypres, against the German spring offensive, and in the victorious Hundred Days Offensive. It was finally disbanded on the Rhine in August 1920.

== Recruitment and training ==
Alfred Leete's recruitment poster for Kitchener's Army.

On 6 August 1914, less than 48 hours after Britain's declaration of war, Parliament sanctioned an increase of 500,000 men for the Regular British Army. The newly appointed Secretary of State for War, Earl Kitchener of Khartoum, issued his famous call to arms: 'Your King and Country Need You', urging the first 100,000 volunteers to come forward. Men flooded into the recruiting offices and the 'first hundred thousand' were enlisted within days. This group of six divisions with supporting arms became known as Kitchener's First New Army, or 'K1'. K2 and K3 followed shortly afterwards.

13th (Service) Battalion was formed as part of K3 at the Kings Royal Rifle Corps' regimental depot at Peninsula Barracks, Winchester, on 7 October 1914. It was designated as 'Army Troops', ie not assigned to a specific formation, but it was attached to 21st Division. After initial training at the crowded barracks at Winchester, the new battalion went by rail to 21st Division's tented camp at Halton Park, near Wendover in Buckinghamshire. In November the battalion moved out of tents into billets in nearby Amersham and Great Missenden.

In April 1915 it moved to Windmill Hill on Salisbury Plain to join the new 37th Division. As authorised in March, 37th Division consisted of Kitchener battalions that had originally been allocated as Army Troops to the New Armies. 13th KRRC was assigned to 111th Brigade in the new division; the brigade also included 10th (Stockbrokers) and 13th Battalions, Royal Fusiliers (RF), and 13th Bn Rifle Brigade (RB). By the time the division assembled, all its units had been training for some months, and it soon began final battle training.

In July orders arrived for the division to move to France to join the British Expeditionary Force (BEF) on the Western Front. 13th KRRC landed at Boulogne on 3 July 1915 under the command of Lieutenant-Colonel Richard Chester-Master, a retired KRRC officer who had been Commandant-General of the British South Africa Police and was Chief Constable of Gloucestershire. By 2 August the division had completed its concentration by rail around Tilques, near Saint-Omer. It then began marching towards the front, where it went into billets in the rear area.

== Service ==
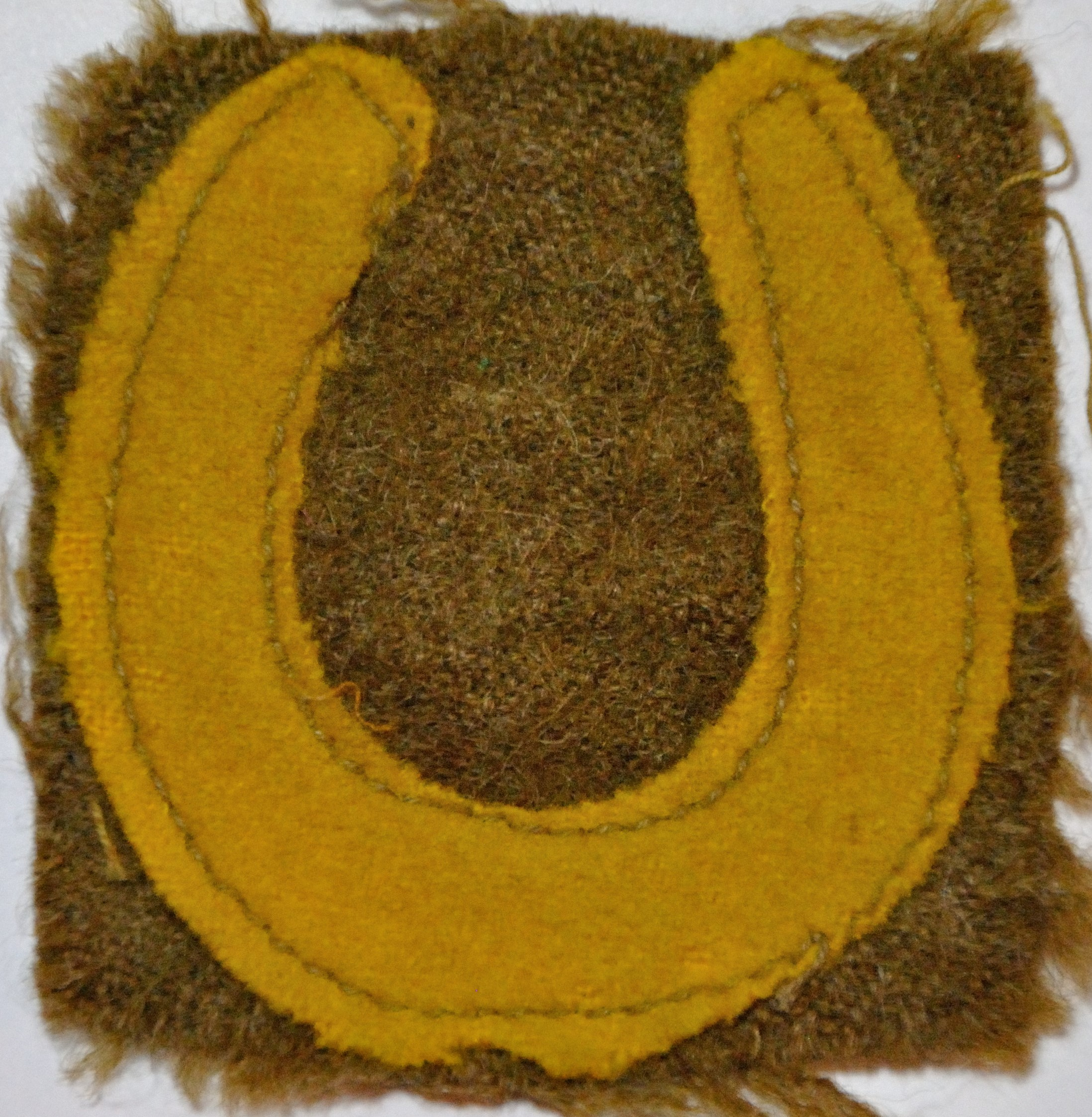
37th Division's 'gold horseshoe' insignia.

The battalions of 111th Bde began providing working parties and then in mid-August went up by companies to be attached to units of 12th (Eastern) Division near Armentières for their introduction to trench warfare. On 25 August they marched to Godewaersvelde and entrained for Doullens where the division took over a section of the Somme front from the French. The battalions of 111st Bde carried out their first spells in the trenches near Hannescamps, from the beginning of September, suffering a few casualties: 13th KRRC relieved 13th RB in the front line on 10 September. When not in the front line the battalions provided working parties. On the evening of 24 September the brigade was moved a few miles north and next day waited in full fighting order in case it was called upon to join in the Battle of Loos that began that day. However, it was not employed, and a few days later it returned to its previous trenches. The battalions settled into a routine of six days in the line, six in reserve and 12 at rest (though often providing working parties). When in the from line, they occasionally mounted trench raids, and there was a trickle of casualties. This routine continued until the end of January 1916, the trenches often being flooded during the winter.

In February the brigade went back into the line, taking over from the French some trenches at Le Gastineau, a few miles north of the Gommecourt Salient. Duty here was six days in the front line and six out of it; 13th KRRC and 10th RF took turns to man the line in their sector. It was quiet sector, apart from occasional artillery bombardments and raids, though the uneven nature of the ground meant that snipers could find good vantage points on the higher ground. On 19 March 41st Division was withdrawn and marched back to the Doullens area to undergo a month's training. It then returned to billets in Humbercamps, just behind the line, where the usual working parties were supplied to the REs until it took over the line again on 1 May. A working party of 13th KRRC heavily shelled one night while digging a new front line trench.

=== Somme ===
13th KRRC had been in France almost a year and had still not participated in any major action, but the BEF was now preparing for that summer's 'Big Push' (the Battle of the Somme). The artillery bombardment began on 23 June and 111th Bde supplied working parties to carry forward gas cylinders for release when the assault was launched on 1 July. Initially, 37th Division was not involved. Then 111th Bde was attached to 34th Division from 7 July as a temporary replacement for a brigade that had been shattered on the First day on the Somme. The fresh troops were immediately rushed to the front to assist with carrying and working parties. 13th RB and 13th RF went up to the line first, then on 10 July 111th Bde HQ, 13th KRRC and 10th RF took over the left sector of 34th Division's front due east of La Boisselle. The trenches were exposed and badly battered by shellfire and 13th RB suffered serious casualties in an attack towards Pozières. The Battle of Bazentin Ridge was launched before dawn on 14 July: 112th Bde attacked Pozières at 08.30 the following morning (15 July), supported by 111th Bde advancing up 'Sausage Valley' The leading waves of 112th Bde were held up 400 yards (370 m) short of Pozières by machine gun fire and the valley became full of bunched up battalions, which began to fall back to the cover of a sunken road. 10th RF gave new impetus to 112th Bde's attack but although fighting went on round the village all day it was not taken and the attacking brigades fell back to the remaining trenches. The brigades remained in the front and support lines until they were relieved on 18 August and rejoined their own division on 22 August.

37th Division moved to the Calonne sector, where it trained and held the line among the coal tips until the autumn. 13th KRRC usually alternated with 10th RF in the front trench, providing working parties when not in the line.

=== Ancre ===
On 17 October 37th Division began a long march back to the Somme, arriving at Puchevillers behind Albert on 22 October. Training here and at Hem-Hardinval was restricted by bad weather and the need to clear muddy roads. On 13 November 111th Bde moved up and came under the command of 63rd (Royal Naval) Division for the continuation of the Battle of the Ancre. It went into the line after dark and 13th KRRC was immediately sent up to extend 190th Bde's position on 63rd (RN) Division's second objective. The battalion's bombing and scout sections made room for this by bombing the enemy out of their trench, extending the line left as far as the next communication trench, 'Redoubt Alley' and capturing 50 Germans in the process. C and D Companies then took over the front line, with A and B in support.

Next day 10th RF mopped up a German redoubt that 63rd (RN) Division had bypassed the day before, then the rest of 111th Bde pushed on to Beaucourt and towards the objective of 'Muck Trench' (so named from its muddy condition). A number of casualties were caused by the British shrapnel barrage: just before the attack went in, a runner arrived at 13th KRRC's Battalion HQ from C Company reporting that all its three officers had become casualties: the battalion Lewis gun officer went up and commanded the company during the attack. 13th KRRC advanced on the right to take Beaucourt village: as it advanced through the village the enemy kept emerging from dugouts where they had been sheltering from the bombardment. These parties were engaged by the battalion bombers and forced to surrender – two officers and 40 men from one dugout alone. By 08.00 the battalion had taken the village, digging in beyond it under the command of the only remaining company commander. The rest of the brigade took Muck Trench without much opposition.

37th Division took over command of the sector on 15 November, and that night 10th RF was sent up to relieve 13th KRRC, discovering and capturing a party of Germans still in the trenches when they arrived. At dawn 10th RF attacked a group of trenches known as the 'Triangle', but was driven back by rifle fire. The two battalions were then ordered to occupy Muck Trench and Railway Trench and establish a chain of strongpoints. Although they reached Muck Trench it was under shellfire and the strongpoints could not be established in daylight; eventually two posts were set up after dark with the assistance of 152nd Field Company, Royal Engineers. At 06.10 on 18 November 111th Bde made another attempt on the Triangle in cooperation with an attack by the neighbouring 32nd Division. At Zero hour 13th KRRC pushed patrols north of Much Trench, meeting only slight opposition in Railway Trench, while 10th RF tried to secure the junction with 32nd Division, which had been held up. Strong patrols during the night also failed to enter the Triangle due to lack of promised artillery support. 10th RF made one last attack on 19 November, but nothing was gained. 111th Brigade was finally relieved from Muck Trench that night and returned to Puchevillers.

After two weeks' training at Puchevillers, where it absorbed poorly trained reinforcements, 111th Bde marched northwards on 13 December, arriving in the trenches of the Neuve-Chapelle sector on 21 December. Here its battalions began a routine of alternating trench duty, the recent reinforcements being trained at Calonne. In early February the brigade shifted to the Hulluch sector, and then. in early March to the divisional training area at Roëllecourt, west of Arras, where it prepared in snowy weather for the forthcoming Battle of Arras.

=== Arras ===
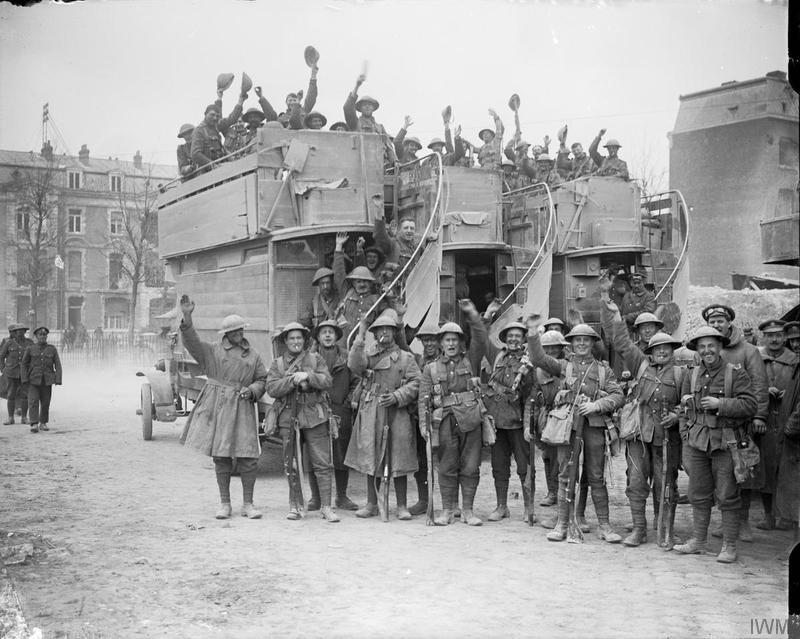
Men of 37th Division boarding London buses after coming out of the line following the capture of Monchy-le-Preux.

111th Brigade's (and Third Army's) objective for this attack was the village of Monchy-le-Preux on the high ground above the River Scarpe, and the operation was carefully rehearsed. The attack was to begin on 9 April after four days of bombardment, with the assaulting formations taking a succession of objectives, the Black, Blue and Brown lines. The fresh 37th Division waiting in the Arras suburbs would then pass through to capture the final (Green Line) objective, just beyond Monchy, but it was unclear whether this could be tackled on the first day. The assault went in at 05.30 and at 12.00 111th and 112th Bdes were ordered up to the Black Line. Then at 15.00 111th Bde followed 12th (Eastern) and 15th (Scottish) Divisions up Battery Valley, believing the Wancourt–Feuchy trenches (the Brown Line) to have already been captured. However, the brigade came under heavy machine gun fire from these trenches. It was not until 18.37 that 15th (S) Division reported the Brown Line secured, and 111th Bde attacked as darkness approached. By now the enemy had recovered from the initial shock of the assault, and the British field artillery was still moving up. 111th Brigade was held up by uncut barbed wire and its supporting tank broke down; the opportunity to seize Monchy on the first day was lost. During the night the troops of 111th and 112th Bdes were disentangled from those of 12th (E) Division, and were ordered to carry out their attack next morning once the rest of the Wancourt–Feuchy trenches had been captured. 37th Division's other brigade (63rd) was already through the gap and holding Orange Hill, so it led the attack. 111th Brigade followed and launched its assault about 12.00 in a snowstorm from the northern slope of Orange Hill, with 10th and 13th RF in the lead and 13th KRRC in support. The field artillery had been unable to advance across the captured ground (although the heavy guns were bombarding Monchy) but the attackers advanced rapidly despite the lack of support. However, the machine gun fire from the village and from the north side of the river brought 10th and 13th RF to a halt about 500 yards (460 m) short of Monchy. An erroneous report that they were in Monchy led to the British cavalry being brought up to exploit a breakthrough, but they achieved nothing. The brigade tried again at 05.00 on 11 April, this time with four tanks in support to suppress the machine guns. Progress was slow and casualties heavy, but 13th KRRC on the right and 13th RB on the left finally made their way to Monchy, followed by 10th RF, who stormed into the village itself about 11.00. The Lewis gun teams pushed out beyond the village took a heavy toll of the retreating defenders. The official historian described the capture of Monchy-le-Preux as 'one of the outstanding feats of the whole battle'. Although the remnant of 111th Bde was now weak, with very few officers, it was assisted in consolidating the village (in a snowstorm) by 63rd Bde and the cavalry. From a battle strength of 20 officers and 400 men in the rifle companies, 13th KRRC had lost 3 officers and 26 other ranks (ORs) killed or died of wounds, 10 officers and 162 ORs wounded and 24 missing.

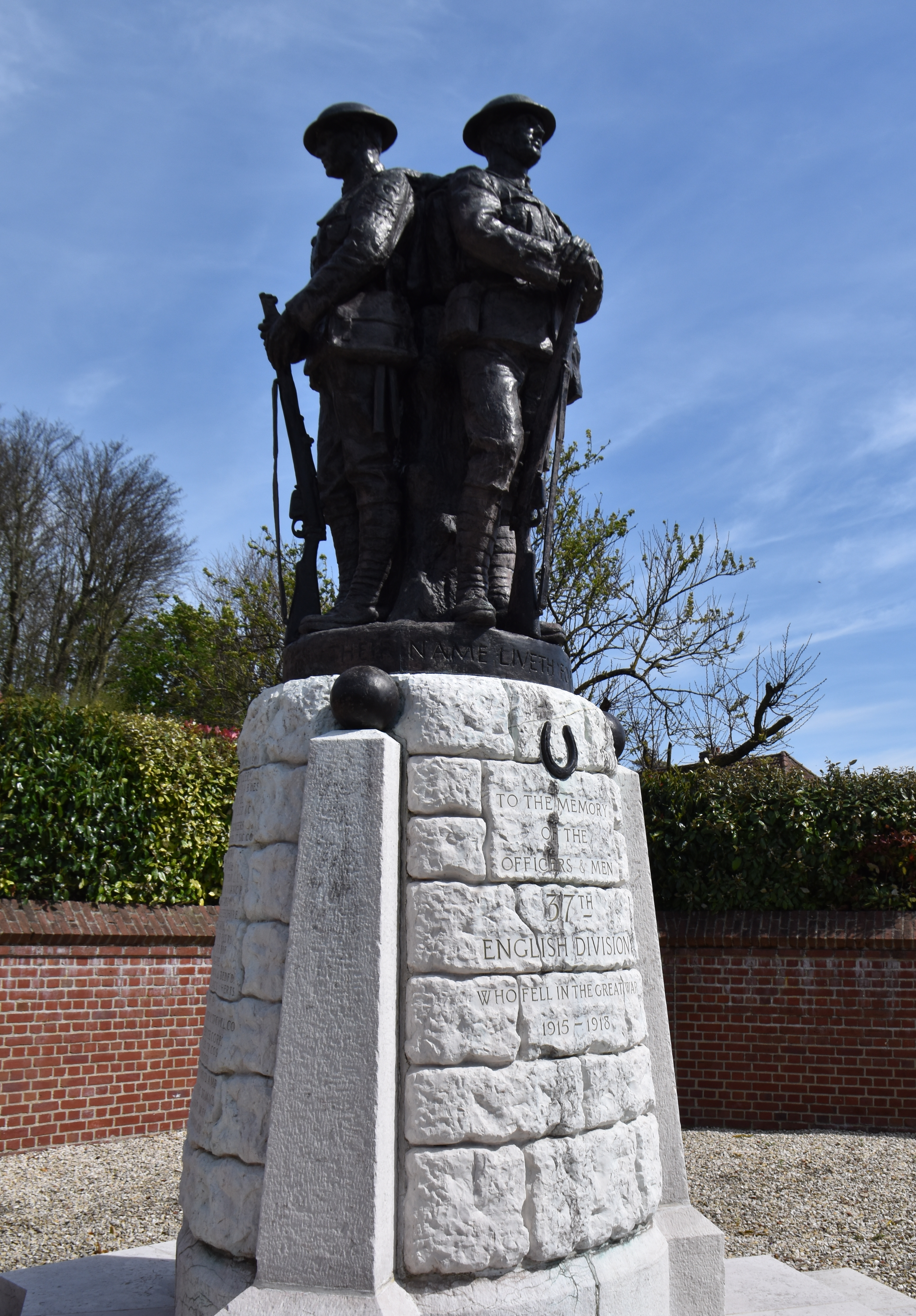
Monument to the 37th Division at Monchy-le-Preux.

111th Brigade returned to the front on 19 April in time for the Second Battle of the Scarpe, opening on 22 April. At Zero (04.45) the brigade started behind a Creeping barrage. 10th and 13th RF captured their first and second objectives, and established themselves in Cuba Trench about 200 yards (180 m) beyond the Rœux–Gavrelle road but could get no further, while 13th KRRC on the left fought its way up to the final objective, the Plouvain–Gavrelle road 800 yards (730 m) further on. Later 13th RB came up from brigade reserve to connect the right of 13th KRRC with the left of 13th RF and protect 13th KRRC's flank from snipers. After this success, the Germans bombarded Cuba Trench heavily, but 111th Bde consolidated it over the following days, with a company of the divisional pioneer battalion, 9th North Staffordshire Regiment helping 13th KRRC to dig in and hold the trench connecting the two roads. At 04.25 on the morning of 28 April 13th RF and 13th KRRC carried out the next assault, on the 'Whip Crossroads' south-east of Gavrelle the only part of the Battle of Arleux (or Gavrelle) that went to plan.

=== Ypres ===
Over the following weeks the battalion alternately trained and held the trenches in the Arras sector. Then on 23 June it began a march north to the Ypres Salient, where 37th Division was to join Second Army for the forthcoming Third Battle of Ypres. It went into the line south of Wyteschaete at the end of June, suffering the usual shellfire. It spent the middle of July behind the lines training for the attack, then re-entered the line. The offensive began with the Battle of Pilckem Ridge on 31 July, in which Second Army played a minor role, advancing its line slightly, with 111th Bde supporting 63rd Bde. It was relieved on 6 August, then spent three weeks training.

The battalion did another tour of duty in the front line from 26 August, during which Lt-Col Chester-Master was killed on 30 August 1917. He is buried at Locre Hospice Cemetery. Major Arnold Strode-Jackson, DSO, was transferred from 13th RB to take over command of the battalion.

The brigade was relieved on 3 September and after resting at Kemmel did further tours of duty in the front and reserve lines and provided working parties, suffering some casualties from Mustard gas shelling and raids. The Germans put in several more attacks on 1 and 3 October to disrupt preparations for the Battle of Broodseinde planned for 4 October, and continued heavy shelling, which caused serious casualties. 111th Brigade's role in the battle was to form a defensive flank, with 13th RF swinging forward to seize some dugouts across the north of Gheluvelt Wood, supported by 13th KRRC and 10th RF. 13th RF followed its creeping barrage so closely that it avoided the prompt German counter-barrage. However, there was rifle and machine gun fire from a blockhouse and 'Lewis House' on the right, which had escaped the bombardment. 13th KRRC could do nothing against Lewis House, and as 13th RF swung forward it came more and more under its fire and had to dig in short of the objective. The battalions were then employed in roadmaking until going into rest billets near Hazebrouck on 26 October.

=== Winter 1917–18 ===
13th KRRC spent the following months training, providing working parties, and holding the line in the Hollebeke and White Chateau sector of the Salient, where raiding and gas attacks were common. On 6 March 111th Bde captured a prisoner who warned of an impending attack. It came at 06.30 on 8 March, when 13th KRRC was in the front line. The Germans shelled the battalion's trenches heavily, attacking and entering them about 14.00. The rest of 111th Bde counter-attacked and restored the position by next morning.

13th KRRC now received a draft of reinforcements from 21st KRRC (Yeoman Rifles), which had been disbanded on 16 March after returning from the Italian Front.

=== Spring Offensive ===
The Germans launched their Spring Offensive against Third and Fifth Armies on 21 March, achieving a near-breakthrough. Although heavily shelled, Second Army was not attacked and quickly despatched reinforcements south to help stem the enemy advance. 37th Division was sent by rail on 28 March, arriving at Hébuterne next day and beginning to take over part of the line near Gommecourt on 31 March/1 April. 37th Division came under attack on 5 April, on the final day of the offensive (the Battle of the Ancre (1918)), but the enemy attack was forestalled by 63rd Bde's attempt to recover Rossignol Wood with tank and artillery support. There was some confusion on 111th Bde's front, where 10th RF were being shifted to allow 13th KRRC to take up position in front of them, but the German attackers were soon bombed back out of the British trenches. 13th KRRC then relieved 10th RF on 8 April. Although the first German offensive had ended in this sector, intermittent shelling, raiding, and bombing by aircraft continued throughout April and May. On 9 May the brigade moved into positions around Foncquevillers. The village was subjected to a saturation bombardment with high explosive and gas shells on the night of 11 May, causing heavy casualties to 10th RF; 13th KRRC relieved the shattered battalion on 13 May.

=== Hundred Days Offensive ===
The Allies launched their Hundred Days Offensive on 8 August. On 19 August 37th Division moved up to take part in a dawn attack next day at Ablainzevelle. At 04.55 the creeping barrage began, and 111th Bde with 13th KRRC attacking on its right had little difficulty achieving its objectives. Two days later 37th Division attacked again at Achiet-le-Grand and Bihucourt. 111th Bde advanced at 11.00 with 13th KRRC and 13th RB in line behind the creeping barrage, supported by tanks, the two battalion COs carrying flags. Then 10th RF passed through at 13.20 behind a fresh hour-long barrage and took Bihucourt. Lieutenant-Col Strode-Jackson was wounded during this attack and Maj W.S. Johns took command of 13th KRRC. The following evening the division attacked Favreuil. 13th KRRC became pinned down in front of the village with heavy casualties, but 10th RF coming up from brigade reserve diverted west of the village and delivered an assault from the flank, causing the defenders to surrender. The battalion was relieved early on the morning of 26 August. During the month, as well as its CO, the battalion had lost 3 officers and 39 ORs killed, 9 officers and 279 ORs wounded and 32 missing.

After a period of training, 37th Division moved up to the edge of Havrincourt Wood for its next attack (the Battle of Havrincourt). After a day of reconnaissance, 111th Brigade led the division's assault on the Trescault Spur on 12 September. 13th KRRC advanced on the left, 13th RB on the right, with 10th RF in support. Major Johns had deployed 13th KRRC with A Company supported by the rifles and Lewis guns of B Company on the left to take Trescault village. As soon as A Company was in the village B Company was to send in two platoons to mop up, while its other two platoons formed a defensive flank in 'Queer Street'. C Company was then to follow A Company to a crossroads south-east of the village, form up there in a sunken road, and then attack Bilhem Farm and the ridge. Once they were established on the ridge A Company was to send a patrol north-east to make contact with 62nd (2nd West Riding) Division, and then the company would 'dribble' forward to link up the line, supported by two Vickers guns of 37th Battalion, Machine Gun Corps. D Company and a light mortar from 111th Trench Mortar Company would be in reserve. The companies were in position 45 minutes before Zero hour, which was timed to coincide with dawn.; they were subjected to heavy shelling with mustard gas while they waited. When the British barrage began at 05.30 the battalion moved off promptly, and although machine guns were active in Trescault village the opposition was soon overrun. As soon as C Company moved out of the sunken lane to take the second objective, it came under heavy fire from a strongpoint about 300 yards (270 m) in front, but this was suppressed by crossfire from 13th RB and the platoons encircled and overran strongpoints, and anti-tank gun and two field guns. By 07.30 the final objective had been taken and the battalion had rounded up 190 prisoners. Nevertheless, there was no cover, and casualties had been heavy, the battalion being shelled all day with gas shells. In the afternoon D company came up to reinforce the line, Maj Johnstone the second-in-command supervising the positions taken up to withstand counter-attacks. A carrying party of 10th RF brought up ammunition. The expected counter-attack came at 18.00, preceded by a heavy bombardment. About 50 Germans advanced up 'Queen's Lane' and forced their way into 'Shaftesbury Avenue' about 1,300 yards (1,200 m) east of the village. They succeeded in destroying the 13th KRRC/13th RB liaison post at the junction of those trenches, but 13th KRRC counter-attacked and drove the intruders back towards 13th RB, and most of them were killed or captured. A strong new liaison post was then established. After this success the battalion was relieved next day.

The Allies carried out a series of coordinated attacks along the Western Front on 26–29 September, including an assault crossing of part of the Canal du Nord. On 30 September 111th Bde found that the German bridgehead at Banteux had been abandoned, and closed up to form an outpost line along the bank of the Escaut Canal. Attempts to push patrols across the canal were repelled, but on 5 October the enemy retreated and 13th KRRC and 13th RB crossed, pushing forward until they met opposition along the Beaurevoir Line. The division assaulted this line as part of the Battle of Cambrai on 8 October. The guns opened up at 04.30 and at 05.10 the barrage started creeping forward, followed by the infantry. D Company of 13th KRRC came under heavy fire and found the wire little damaged, but 'poured' through the gaps and deployed immediately behind. It had taken objective by 07.30. 37th Division gained all its objectives, and 13th KRRC alone took over 300 prisoners. 37th Division's advance now became a pursuit of the beaten enemy to the River Selle, but 111th Bde was withdrawn for rest at Bapaume.

The brigade was back in the line on 23 October for the second day of the BEF's next set-piece attack, the Battle of the Selle. After 5th Division had taken the first three objectives, including the village of Beaurain, 37th Division was to assemble 111th Bde behind a smoke barrage and then send it through at 08.00. The Germans defended Beaurain tenaciously, and 111th Bde's move was postponed. When it went forward at 10.00, with 13th KRRC and 13th RB in the lead, it reached its objective by 14.30 and 13th KRRC's patrols found Neuville and the railway embankment clear of the enemy as far as the River St George. The brigade commander held a battalion commanders' conference and decided to resume the advance at 17.15 from the river with an artillery barrage. The companies were still closing up to the river at 17.30 when the barrage moved on from the far bank, and there was still strong opposition from the railway away to the right, which was holding up the neighbouring formation. D Company 13th KRRC and C Company 10th RF were sent to advance either side of the railway and mop it up, but without a renewed barrage they could do little except form a defensive flank. The brigade made a few minor advances during the night to prepare a jumping off line from which 112th Bde continued the advance next morning. 111th Brigade went back to Neuville, then spent 10 days in 'very bad' billets at Beaurain.

The brigade was brought forward on the night of 3/4 November for the next operation, part of the Battle of the Sambre. 13th KRRC and 13th RB launched the assault at 05.30 and reached the Blue Line objective, where they mopped up the strongpoints. Heavy mist ruled out visual communication, and the runners had trouble getting through the barrages that the Germans laid behind the attacking battalions, but 10th RF the passed through 13th KRRC to continue the attack through Louvignies and the brigade was on its final objective, the Blue Dotted Line, by 20.00. It was 13th KRRC's last battle.

Early on 5 November 5 Division passed through and took over from the 37th, which concentrated with 111th Bde staying in its 'bad' billets at Beaurain. On 11 November the division moved to Caudry, and during the march the men were told that the Armistice with Germany had come into force at 11.00, bringing hostilities to an end.

== Post-Armistice ==
The units of 37th Division were now employed in training, education and recreation. On 1 December they began a long move to an area north of Charleroi, but from 2 to 14 December were billeted north of Le Quesnoy in bad weather until the march could resume. On 20 December the division settled into its final billets near Charleroi. Demobilisation began in December.

On 15 February 1919 37th Division began to disband, and it ceased to exist on 24/25 March. 13th KRRC, however, was transferred to 2nd Division, which was being converted into a new Light Division for occupation duties in the British Army of the Rhine. The battalion was kept up to strength by absorbing 51st (S) Bn, KRRC (converted from a former training battalion) on 4 April 1919. The Light Division was disbanded in November 1919, but 1st Light Brigade, including 13th KRRC, continued as the Light Brigade in the Independent Division until January 1920. 13th (Service) Battalion, King's Royal Rifle Corps was disbanded on the Rhine on 20 February 1920.

== Insignia ==
37th Division's formation sign was originally a gold horseshoe pointing downwards; in November 1916 this was changed to point upwards. In 1916 the Division adopted a system of 'battle patches' on the upper arm to identify individual units and subunits. These were based on brigade colours (111th Bde wore blue), geometric shapes for battalions, and horizontal stripes to indicate companies. For 13th KRRC the shape was a blue square worn below the company stripe across the base of the shoulder strap. These stripes were red for A Company, dark blue for B, purple for C and green for D.

== Commanders ==
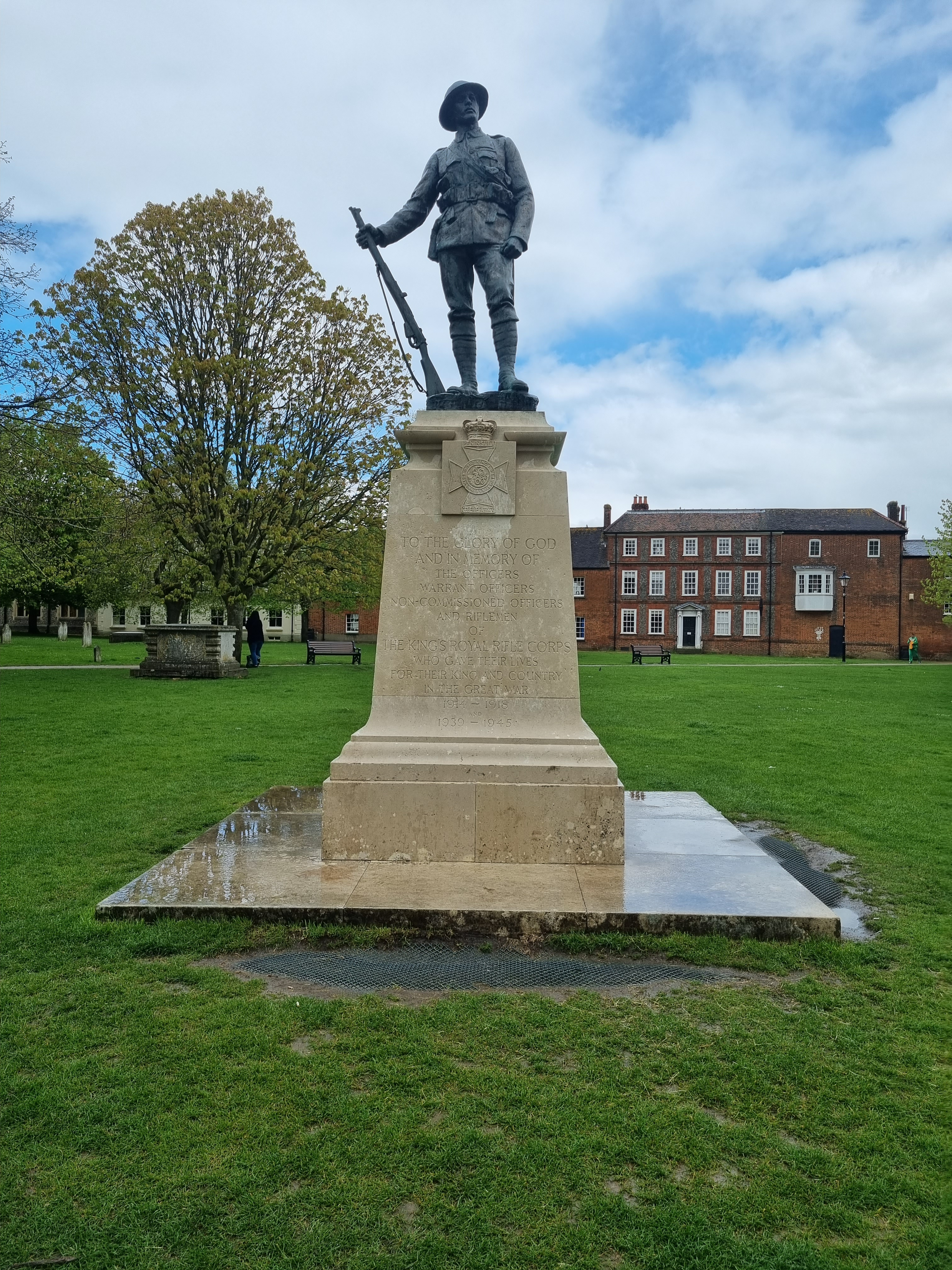
The KRRC memorial at Winchester.

- Lt-Col Richard Chester-Master, DSO & Bar, killed in action 30 August 1917
- Lt-Col A.N. Strode-Jackson, DSO, wounded 24 August 1918
- Maj W.S. Johns

== Memorials ==
37th Division's memorial is at Monchy-le-Preux, scene of its greatest success. It was sculpted by Lady Feodora Gleichen, sister of the divisional commander, Maj-Gen Lord Edward Gleichen.

The KRRC's World War I memorial, with sculpture by John Tweed, stands near the west door of Winchester Cathedral.

Lt-Col Richard Chester-Master, DSO & Bar, is commemorated at Christ Church Cathedral, Oxford.
