= Reginald Barnes =

Major-General Sir Reginald Barnes KCB DSO DL JP
- Major-General Barnes in 1918
- Born: 13 April 1871; Stoke Canon, England
- Died: 9 December 1946 (aged 75); Honiton, England
- Military career
- Allegiance: United Kingdom
- Branch: British Army
- Service years: 1890–1921
- Rank: Major-General
- Nickname: Reggie
- Units: King's Shropshire Light Infantry; 4th (Queen's Own) Hussars; Imperial Light Horse; 17th Imperial Yeomanry; 2nd Imperial Yeomanry; 17th (Duke of Cambridge's Own) Lancers; 10th (Prince of Wales's Own) Royal Hussars
- Commands: 2nd Imperial Yeomanry; 10th (Prince of Wales's Own) Royal Hussars; 111th Brigade; 32nd Division; 57th (2nd West Lancashire) Division; 55th (West Lancashire) Division
- Conflicts: Cuban War of Independence Second Boer War: Battle of Elandslaagte; Battle of the Tugela Heights; Relief of Ladysmith; Relief of Mafeking; Battle of Belfast; First World War: 10th Hussars; First Battle of Ypres; Battle of Langemarck; Battle of Gheluvelt; Battle of Nonne Bosschen; Second Battle of Ypres; Battle of Frezenberg Ridge; Battle of Loos; 116th Brigade; Battle of Richebourg l'Avoue; Battle of the Somme; Battle of Thiepval Ridge; Battle of the Ancre Heights; 32nd Division; Pursuit to the Hindenburg Line; 57th Division; Second Battle of Arras; Battle of the Scarpe; Battle of Drocourt-Queant Line; Battle of the Canal du Nord; Battle of Cambrai; Final Advance in Artois and Flanders; Occupation of Lille
- Awards: Companion of the Distinguished Service Order; Knight Commander of The Most Honourable Order of the Bath; Croix de Guerre
- Other work: Deputy Lieutenant; Justice of the Peace

Major-General Sir Reginald Walter Ralph Barnes KCB DSO DL JP (13 April 1871 – 19 December 1946) was a cavalry officer in the British Army. He served in several regiments, and commanded a battalion of the Imperial Yeomanry, the 10th (Prince of Wales's Own) Royal Hussars, the 111th Brigade, and three divisions.

During his career he served in the Cuban War of Independence, the Second Boer War and the First World War. Becoming a Companion of the Distinguished Service Order, and a Knight Commander of The Most Honourable Order of the Bath. He was also awarded a French Croix de Guerre.

== History ==
=== Early life ===
Reginald Walter Ralph Barnes was born 13 April 1871, at Stoke Canon Exeter, the son of Prenbendary R H Barnes. He was educated at Westminster School, before in December 1888, becoming a second-lieutenant in the part-time 4th (Hereford Militia) Battalion, King's Shropshire Light Infantry. He was promoted to lieutenant in September 1889. Then in December 1890 he transferred to the regular army, dropping down a rank to second-lieutenant, when he joined the 4th (Queen's Own) Hussars. He regained his substantive rank of lieutenant in May 1893. In 1894 and again in 1895 Barnes was one of a cabal of subalterns who harassed fellow junior officers into leaving the regiment because they were perceived as not meeting its social or other standards.

=== Cuban War of Independence and India ===
His first experience of war came in November 1895, when he was attached as an observer of guerrilla warfare to the Spanish Army during the Cuban War of Independence, together with his fellow 4th Hussars officer, a twenty-one-year-old Winston Churchill. Churchill was an accredited journalist for the London Daily Graphic newspaper, sending them dispatches from the front. But both officers were also under orders from Colonel Edward Chapman, the British Director of Military Intelligence to "collect information and statistics on various points and particularly as to the effect of the new bullet its penetration and striking power". Returning to England Barnes became the regimental adjutant, from May 1896 for the next four years. The regiment was stationed in British India in late 1896 and Barnes shared a bungalow with Churchill in Bangalore.

=== Second Boer War ===
In 1899, Barnes was seconded as adjutant to the Imperial Light Horse in South-Africa, and on 31 December 1899 he was promoted to captain. He was present at the Battle of Elandslaagte in October 1899, and in February 1900 at the Battle of the Tugela Heights, which was part of the relief of Ladysmith. That was followed by the relief of Mafeking, in May and June 1900. Next were operations in the Transvaal around Pretoria, and the battle of Belfast in August. His participation in the war was recognised by being created a Companion of the Distinguished Service Order (DSO).

As the nature of the war changed into one of attrition, in May 1901, he became a local major and second in command of the 17th Battalion Imperial Yeomanry. Only two months later, in July 1901, he was promoted to temporary lieutenant-colonel and commanding officer of the 2nd Battalion Imperial Yeomanry, serving as such until March 1902, when he returned to an ordinary posting in his regiment. He returned to the United Kingdom by the steamship Kildonan Castle the same month. As well as his DSO, Barnes was also mentioned in dispatches for his service in South Africa.

=== Between wars ===
In the post Boer War period, Barnes carried out several non-regimental staff duties. On 1 May 1904, he became the Aide de Camp to General The Viscount Kitchener in his position as Commander-in-Chief, India, until January 1906. He then became an instructor at the Cavalry School, until December 1907, when he was promoted to major and transferred to the 17th (Duke of Cambridge's Own) Lancers. He remained with his new regiment until October 1909 and was the employed by as the Assistant Military Secretary to the Governor and Commander-in-Chief, Malta Leslie Rundle. That posting lasted until February 1911, when he was promoted to lieutenant-colonel and given command of the 10th (Prince of Wales's Own) Royal Hussars, taking over from John Vaughan, who later became a major general.

=== First World War ===
On the outbreak of war the 10th Hussars were stationed in South Africa. The regiment sailed for Britain arriving 22 September 1914 and were assigned to the 6th Cavalry Brigade. They then travelled to the Western Front as part of the 3rd Cavalry Division, commanded by Major General Sir Julian Byng, missing the early stages of the conflict. On 20 November the same year the regiment came under command of the 8th Cavalry Brigade. While under Barnes' command the regiment fought in the First Battle of Ypres and the Second Battle of Ypres, with Barnes reported wounded in December 1914.

He was then, in April 1915, promoted to the temporary rank of brigadier general and given command of the newly-formed 132nd Infantey Brigade, shortly afterwards renumbered as 111th Infantry Brigade of the 37th Division of Kitchener's Army. His brigade was formed from the 10th (Stockbrokers) and 13th Battalions, Royal Fusiliers, the 13th Battalion, King's Royal Rifle Corps and the 13th Battalion, Rifle Brigade.

Barnes was invested with the Companionship of the Order of the Bath in June 1916 and promoted to temporary major-general in November. He then commanded the 32nd Division, another Kitchener's Army formation, from 22 November until he went sick on 9 January 1917.

He took command of the Territorial Force's 57th (2nd West Lancashire) Division from 1 July 1917, for which he was once again made a temporary major general, and which he commanded from then until the end of the war in November 1918. His promotion to substantive major general came in May 1918; an

=== Post war ===
In the immediate post war period, Barnes was awarded several honours. In January 1919, he was appointed the Colonel of the Regiment to the 4th Hussars. In June he was given command of the Territorial 55th (West Lancashire) Division, and invested as a Knight Commander of The Most Honourable Order of the Bath. He was also twice awarded the French Croix de Guerre.

Away from army life he resided at Oakhay Barton, Stoke Canon in Devon, marrying Gunhilla Wijk, a widow, in 1919. Their son, Second-Lieutenant Reginald Ralph Barnes of the Coldstream Guards, was killed during the Second World War.

He finally retired from the army in March 1921. He was appointed Deputy Lieutenant for Devon in August 1927 until his death in 1946. He also became a Justice of the Peace.

== Notes ==
Military offices
Preceded by Robert Broadwood	GOC 57th (2nd West Lancashire) Division; 1917–1919	Succeeded by Post disbanded
Preceded by Sir Hugh Jeudwine	GOC 55th (West Lancashire) Division; 1919–1921	Succeeded by Sir Lothian Nicholson
