= 13th (Service) Battalion, Royal Fusiliers =

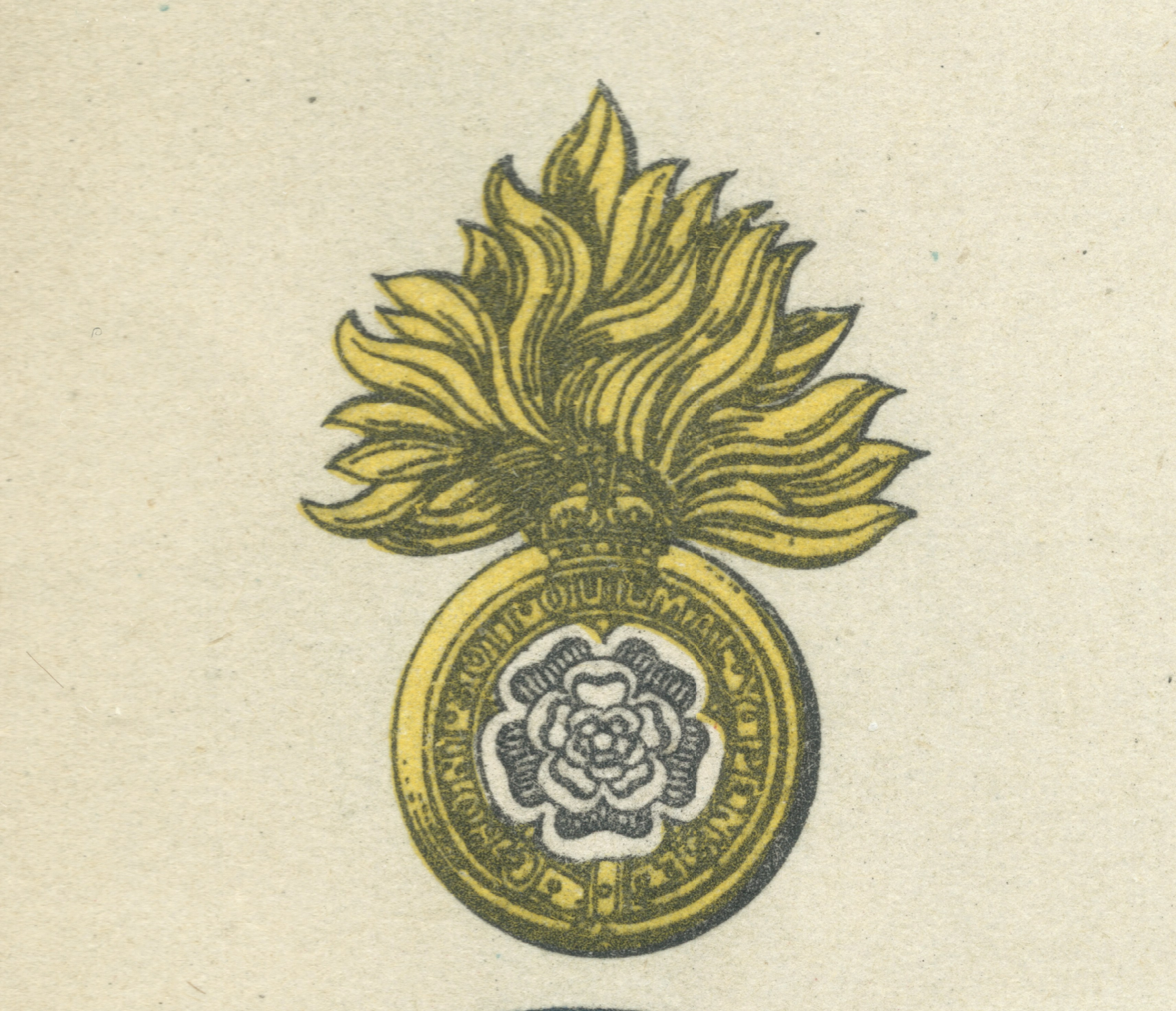
- Cap badge of the Royal Fusiliers
- Active: 13 September 1914–17 May 1919
- Allegiance: United Kingdom
- Branch: New Army
- Role: Infantry
- Size: One Battalion
- Part of: 37th Division
- Garrison/HQ: Hounslow
- Engagements: Battle of the Somme; Battle of the Ancre; Battle of Arras; Third Battle of Ypres; German spring offensive Hundred Days Offensive

The 13th (Service) Battalion, Royal Fusiliers, (13th RF) was an infantry unit recruited as part of 'Kitchener's Army' in World War I. It served on the Western Front from July 1915 until the Armistice, seeing action at the Somme and the Ancre, at Arras and Ypres, against the German spring offensive, and in the final Hundred Days Offensive.

== Recruitment and training ==
Alfred Leete's recruitment poster for Kitchener's Army.

On 6 August 1914, less than 48 hours after Britain's declaration of war, Parliament sanctioned an increase of 500,000 men for the Regular British Army. The newly appointed Secretary of State for War, Earl Kitchener of Khartoum, issued his famous call to arms: 'Your King and Country Need You', urging the first 100,000 volunteers to come forward. Men flooded into the recruiting offices and the 'first hundred thousand' were enlisted within days. This group of six divisions with supporting arms became known as Kitchener's First New Army, or 'K1'. K2 and K3 followed shortly afterwards.

13th (Service) Battalion, Royal Fusiliers, was formed as part of K3 at the Royal Fusiliers' regimental depot at Hounslow on 13 September 1914, under the command of Colonel F.P. Hutchinson of the Indian Army. It was designated as 'Army Troops', ie not assigned to a specific formation, but it was attached to 24th Division camped under canvas on the South Downs. By the time the K3 units were formed the shortage of uniforms, equipment and instructors for the Kitchener units had become critical. 24th Division did not receive its first khaki uniforms until March 1915. After the weather broke the troops were moved out of their camps and billeted in the local towns: 13th RF moved into Worthing in December 1914. It remained there until 9 April 1915, when it moved to Ludgershall, Wiltshire, to join 44th (later 37th) Division.

As authorised in March 1915, 37th Division consisted of Kitchener battalions that had originally been allocated as Army Troops to the New Armies. 13th Royal Fusiliers was assigned to 111th Brigade in the new division; the brigade also included 10th RF (Stockbrokers), 13th King's Royal Rifle Corps (KRRC), and 13th Rifle Brigade (RB). By April 1915 when the division was formed, all its units had been training for some months, and it was quickly assembled on Salisbury Plain for final battle training.

On 17 June Temporary Major Henry J. Des Voeux from the 7th Bn Northamptonshire Regiment (formerly of the Grenadier Guards) was promoted to Temporary Lieutenant-Colonel to command 13th RF. In July orders arrived for the division to move to France to join the British Expeditionary Force (BEF) on the Western Front. Embarkation began on 28 July and 13th RF landed at Boulogne two days later. By 2 August the division had completed its concentration around Tilques, near Saint-Omer.

== Service ==
On arrival the units of 37th Division were attached to those of 12th (Eastern) Division for instruction in trench warfare in the quiet sector near Armentières. At the end of August 37th Division entrained for Doullens and then marched to Foncquevillers in the Somme sector, where the BEF was taking over more of the line from French troops. The battalions took turns in the front line, and there was a steady trickle of casualties. From 23 to 27 September during the Battle of Loos the division was stationed at La Cauchie to act as reserve for the French Tenth Army's attack, but then returned to Foncquevillers and the routine of trench holding alternating with billets in Souastre through the autumn and winter.

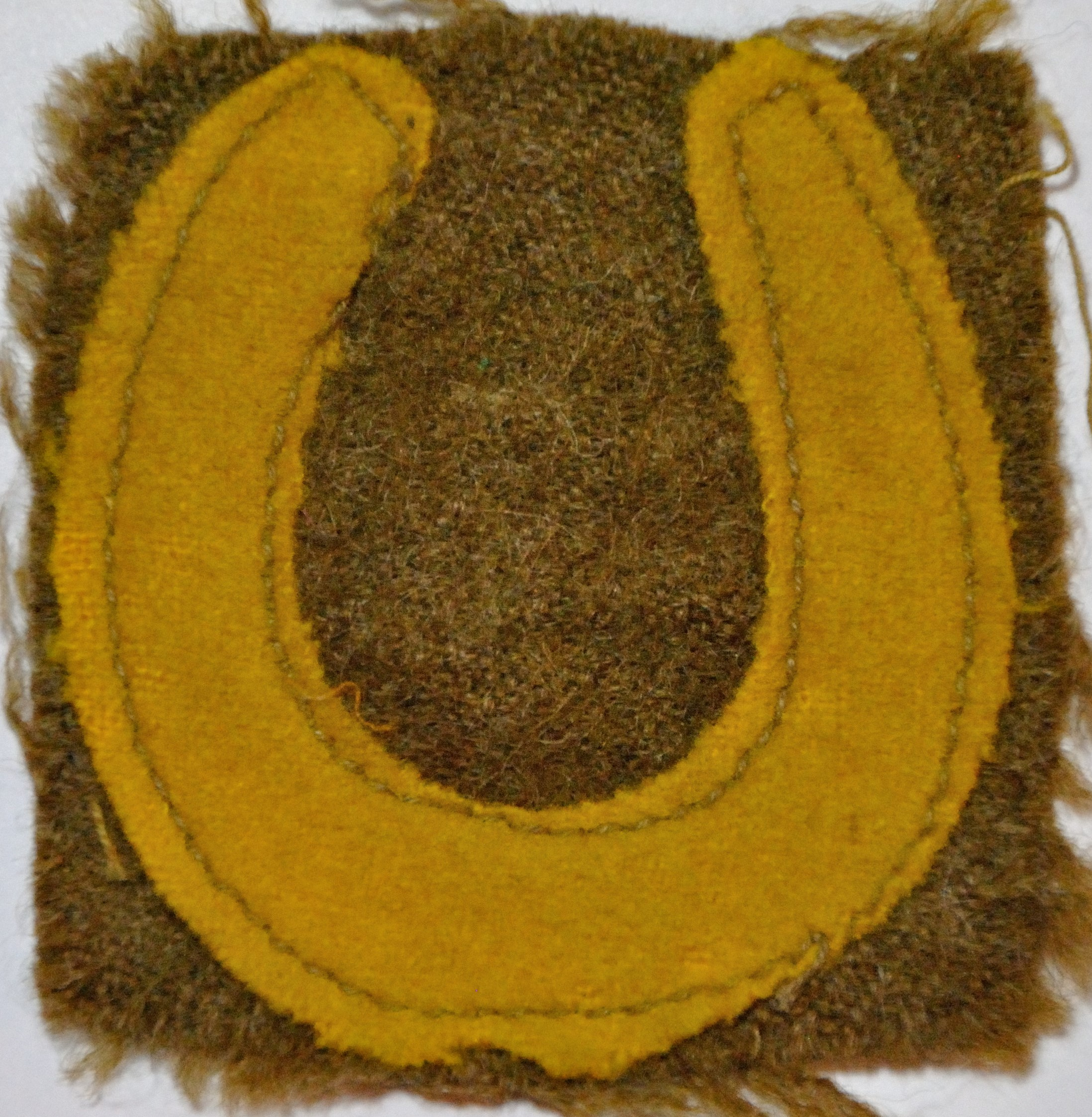
37th Division's 'gold horseshoe' insignia.

=== Somme ===
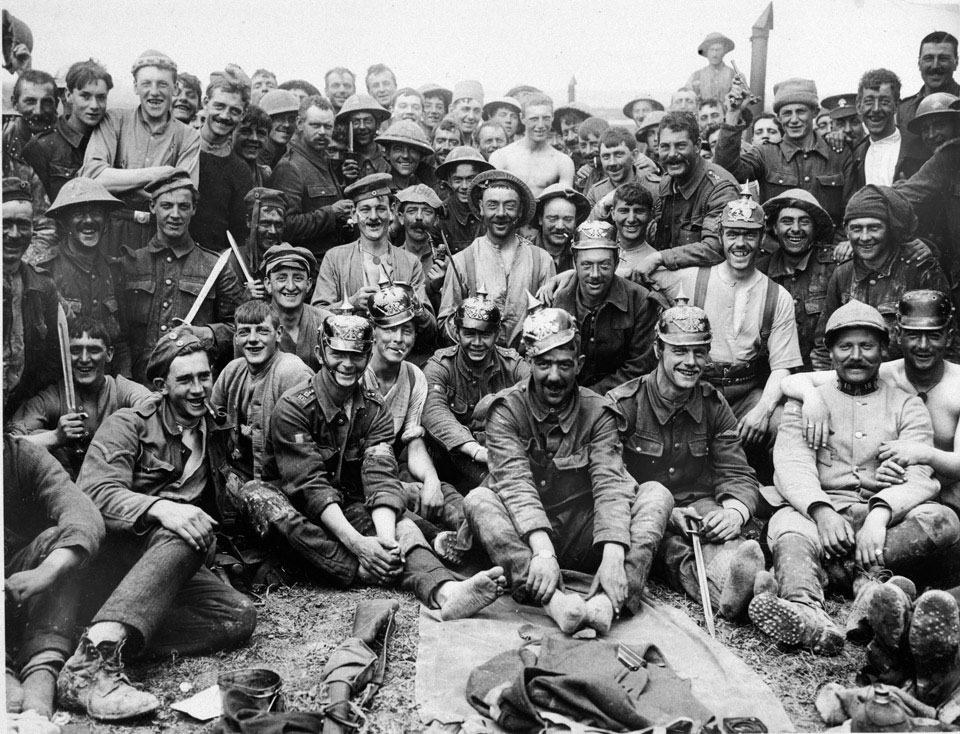
Soldiers from the 13th (Service) Battalion, Royal Fusiliers, rest after their attack on La Boisselle on the Somme, 7 July 1916. Several display German helmets and bayonets captured as trophies.

By June 1916 13th RF had been in France almost a year and had still not participated in any major action, but the BEF was now preparing for that summer's 'Big Push' (the Battle of the Somme). The artillery bombardment began on 23 June and the assault was launched on 1 July. Initially, 37th Division was not involved. Then 111th Brigade was attached to 34th Division from 7 July as a temporary replacement for a brigade that had been shattered on the First day on the Somme. The fresh troops were immediately rushed to the front. At 02.00 on 7 July 13 RF was assembled in the old German front line in front of La Boisselle ready to attack between Ovillers and Contalmaison. It was warned not to attack until ordered to do so by brigade HQ, or until the flanking attacks were well ahead. By 08.25 the battalion had lost touch with brigade HQ, but the flanks had advanced so Maj Ardagh led off with Nos 1 and 2 Companies, with bombing sections covering the flanks. Due east of La Boisselle some resistance was encountered that held up No 2 Company, and by the time this was overcome the right flank had lost touch with the neighbouring brigade. Nevertheless, the battalion gained nearly 1,000 yards (910 m), occupying with little opposition its objective, a German trench running into the north end of Ovillers. During consolidation of this line some casualties were suffered from German artillery fire. Next day the battalion was ordered to push on to the next line. Captain Nelson took Nos 3 and 4 Companies on to this objective, stretching from the main Albert road to about 700 yards (640 m) west of Contalmaison. A small party pushed on ahead and suffered severely, but in two days the battalion had pushed the line forward materially, captured a battery of field artillery, several machine guns and nearly 200 prisoners for casualties that were moderate by the standards of the Somme: 1 officer and 20 other ranks (ORs) killed, 4 officers and 127 ORs wounded, and 13 missing.

On 10 July the rest of 111th Bde took over the left sector of 34th Division's front east of La Boisselle and continued pushing forward. The Battle of Bazentin Ridge was launched before dawn on 14 July: 112th Bde attacked Pozières at 08.30 the following morning (15 July), supported by 111th Bde. The attack was held up and although 10th RF of 111th Bde gave it new impetus it bogged down again. In the evening the attacking brigades fell back to the remaining trenches. 111th Brigade spent early August digging and wiring new trenches in the High Wood area, suffering casualties from enemy shellfire. It moved north by rail to Calonne-sur-la-Lys and rejoined 37th Division on 22 August. Lieutenant-Col Des Voeux was evacuated sick during the month.

=== Ancre ===
For over a month 13th RF and 13th RB shared a section of the line facing the coaltips of the Lens area, then on 17 October 37th Division marched back to the Somme, arriving at Puchevillers behind Albert on 22 October. Training here and at Hem-Hardinval was restricted by bad weather and the need to clear muddy roads. On 13 November 111th Bde moved up to the line and came under the command of 63rd (Royal Naval) Division for the Battle of the Ancre. Next day 10th RF mopped up a German redoubt that 63rd (RN) Division had bypassed the day before, then the rest of 111th Bde pushed on to Beaucourt, with 13th RF advancing between 13th KRRC and 13th RB. 13th RF set off a little too early and suffered casualties from its own barrage. It then fell back 50 yards (46 m) before resuming the advance under harassing machine gun fire from Beaucourt to the first objective, still ahead of the rest of the brigade. After an hour and a half more shelling on the final objective ('Muck Trench', so named from its muddy condition), 13th RF advanced with 13th KRRC and 7th RF (from 63rd (RN) Division) and took it without much opposition, though Lt-Col Ardagh was wounded. 37th Division took over command of the sector on 15 November and established strongpoints. On 18 and 19 November the rest of 111th Bde attempted to get forward to a group of trenches known as the 'Triangle', but was driven back by rifle fire. It was relieved from Muck Trench that night and returned to Puchevillers.

37th Division marched northwards on 13 December, arriving in the trenches of the Neuve-Chapelle sector on 21 December. Here the battalions of 111th Bde began a routine of alternating trench duty with each other. In early February the brigade shifted to the Hulluch sector, and in early March it marched to the divisional training area at Roëllecourt, west of Arras, where it trained in snowy weather for the forthcoming Battle of Arras.

=== Arras ===
Third Army's objective for this attack was the village of Monchy-le-Preux on the high ground above the River Scarpe, and the operation was carefully rehearsed. The attack was to begin on 9 April after four days of bombardment, with the assaulting formations taking a succession of objectives, the Black, Blue and Brown lines. The fresh 37th Division waiting in the Arras suburbs would then pass through to capture the final (Green Line) objective, just beyond Monchy, but it was unclear whether this could be tackled on the first day. The assault went in at 05.30 and 13th RF reached Blangy at 11.30 without casualties. At 12.00 111th and 112th Bdes were ordered up to the Black Line, 13th RF being told at 13.10 to move forward and take up positions in 'Battery Valley' along the line of 'Fred's Wood', about 200 yards (180 m) north of the railway and east of Blangy. At about 18.45 the battalion crossed the Blue Line to move into position to begin the attack on Monchy. It now began to take casualties, and found that the Wancourt–Feuchy trenches (the Brown Line) in front were still untaken: there was no alternative but to capture this line first. By now the enemy had recovered from the initial shock of the assault, and the British field artillery was still moving up. The battalion advanced steadily about 2,000 yards (1,800 m) until it was brought to a halt just east of the Feuchy–Feuchy Chapel road. Here it formed a defensive flank and dug in at nightfall supported b y 13th RB; the opportunity to seize Monchy on the first day was lost. During the night the troops of 111th and 112th Bdes were disentangled from those of 12th (E) Division, and were ordered to carry out their attack next morning once the rest of the Wancourt–Feuchy trenches had been captured. 37th Division's other brigade (63rd) was already through the gap and holding 'Orange Hill', so it led the attack. 111th Brigade followed and launched its assault about 12.00, 13th RF crossing the northern slope of Orange Hill in a snowstorm and then swinging half-left towards the outlying woods west of Monchy. The brigade made ground rapidly despite the lack of field artillery support (although the heavy guns were bombarding Monchy). However, the machine gun fire from the village and from the north side of the river brought 10th and 13th RF to a halt about 500 yards (460 m) short of Monchy. An erroneous report that they were in Monchy led to the British cavalry being brought up to exploit a breakthrough, but they achieved nothing. By 19.40 13th RF only had three officers left beside the commanding officer and adjutant. After consultation with the Royal Engineers (REs), the battalion dug a provisional line of trenches west of the village, completing this line about 04.00 on 11 April. About an hour and a half later 13th and 10th RF made a final attempt on Monchy, this time with four tanks in support. Progress was slow, but 13th RF established itself north of the village and held the position all day, while the remnant of 10th RF stormed into the village itself about 11.00. The official historian described the capture of Monchy-le-Preux as 'one of the outstanding feats of the whole battle'. Although the remnant of 111th Bde was now weak, with very few officers, it was assisted in consolidating the village by 63rd Bde and the cavalry before it was relieved at 23.00 that night.

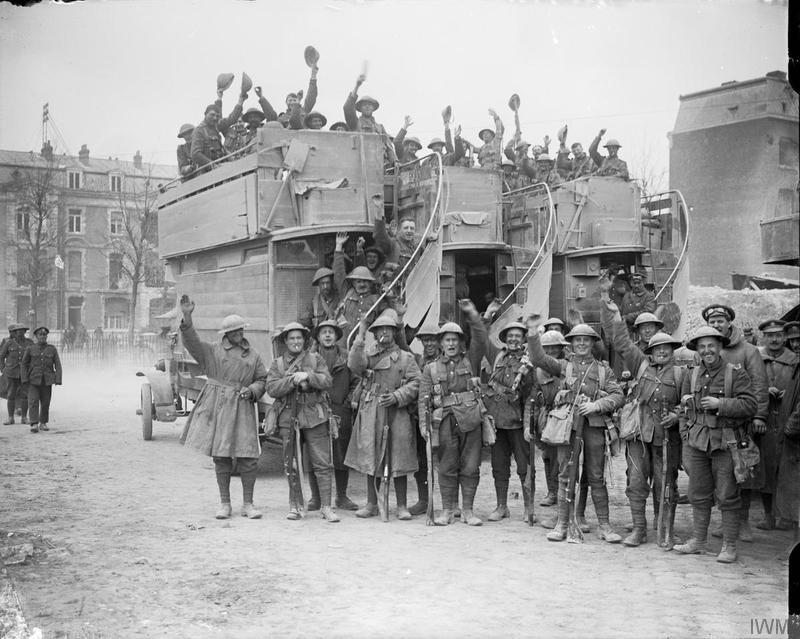
Men of 37th Division boarding London buses after coming out of the line after the capture of Monchy-le-Preux.

111th Brigade returned to the front on 19 April in time for the Second Battle of the Scarpe, opening on 22 April. At Zero (04.45) 10th and 13th RF advanced with each company in four waves, closely following the Creeping barrage. The advance went to plan until the German second line trench was reached. 63rd Brigade on the right had edged too far left, and 13th RF on the left was a little slow coming forward, so the 10th RF was open to machine gun fire from the flanks. Once the confusion was sorted out, a patrol reported that the second objective, 'Cuba Trench', was unoccupied. The remnant of 10th RF occupied the trench by 09.30, and was followed in by 13th RF and 13th KRRC. Patrols made contact with the Germans along a road about 0.5 miles (0.80 km) ahead. After this success, the Germans bombarded Cuba Trench heavily, but 111th Bde consolidated it over the following days. At 04.25 on the morning of 28 April 13th RF and 13th RB carried out the next assault, on the 'Whip Crossroads' south-east of Gavrelle. 13th RB gained its objectives within two hours, then about 08.25 No 3 Company of 13th RF came up alongside, but could not contact any troops on the other (right) flank and a German machine gun was in action at the crossroads. By 10.15, however, the situation had been cleared up, with Nos 3 and 4 Companies, 13th RF, firmly holding the crossroads. This was the only part of the Battle of Arleux or Gavrelle that went to plan: later in the day 63rd Bde attacked across the battalion's front, having lost direction, and a number of Fusiliers got caught up with them, until recalled. The battalion was relieved on the night of 29 April.

=== Ypres ===
The brigade continued line-holding in front of Arras during May, then on 23 June the battalions began a march north to the Ypres Salient, where 37th Division was to join Second Army for the forthcoming Ypres Offensive. The battalions went into the line south of Wyteschaete on 28 June, suffering a few casualties over following days from shellfire and patrolling. The offensive began with the Battle of Pilckem Ridge on 31 July, in which Second Army played a minor role, advancing its line slightly.

The brigade did further tours of duty in the front and reserve lines and provided working parties, suffering some casualties from Mustard gas shelling. On 30 September 13 RF was raided by the Germans at dawn. The battalion was astride the Menin Road, with an advanced outpost in a blockhouse near the western edge of Gheluvelt Wood. At 05.30 the enemy put down a heavy bombardment by Trench mortars on the whole position including the support lines. Ten minutes later the outpost, held by an officer and 10 ORs of No 2 Company, was attacked by about 300 Germans equipped with flamethrowers. After a fierce struggle the post was overrun, with all the garrison killed or captured. No 2 Company immediately put in a counter-attack and cleared the blockhouse of the enemy. The battalion's total casualties were 26 in a very short time. The Germans put in several more attacks on 1 and 3 October to disrupt preparations for the Battle of Broodseinde planned for 4 October, and continued heavy shelling in which No 1 Company was virtually wiped out and No 3 's carrying parties lost heavily. Afterwards the remainder of No 2 Company was divided between them. When the battalion went into action on 4 October its frontline strength was only 13 officers and 233 ORs. 111th Brigade's role in the battle was to form a defensive flank, with 13th RF swinging forward to seize some dugouts across the north of Gheluvelt Wood. The battalion was in position by 05.15, and at 05.30 the enemy brought down a heavy barrage, most of it luckily missing the battalion. Zero was at 06.00, and 13th RF followed its creeping barrage so closely that it avoided the prompt German counter-barrage. However, there was rifle and machine gun fire from a blockhouse and 'Lewis House' on the right, which had escaped the bombardment. 13th KRRC could do nothing against Lewis House, and as 13th RF swung forward it came more and more under its fire and had to dig in short of the objective. Of the 246 men who attacked, 208 had become casualties.

=== Winter 1917–18 ===
37th Division held the line in the Hollebeke and White Chateau sectors of the Salient, where raiding and gas attacks were common through the winter. By February 1918 the BEF was suffering a manpower crisis: each infantry brigade was reduced from four to three battalions, and the surplus battalions were broken up to provide reinforcements to others. This did not affect any of the battalions of 111th Bde, but three were disbanded from 112th Bde, and 13th RF was transferred on 4 February to help rebuild that formation. It was now brigaded with 6th Bedfordshire Regiment and 1st Essex Regiment. 13th RF received a draft of reinforcements from the disbanded 20th RF (3rd Public Schools).

On 6 March 111th Bde captured a prisoner who warned of an impending attack. It came at 06.30 on 8 March, when 13th RF was once more astride the Menin Road, with 13th KRRC of 111th Bde. The Germans shelled the trenches heavily, particularly those of 13th KRRC, which it attacked and occupied about 14.00. 10th RF and the rest of 111th Bde counter-attacked and restored the position by next morning. No attack had developed against 13th RF, but it had suffered heavily from the bombardments, particularly No 3 Company that lost all of its officers and was commanded by a sergeant. Platoons of Nos 2 and 4 Companies went up as reinforcements and the line was held intact. 13th RF lost 7 officers and 140 ORs in this unnamed action.

=== German Spring Offensive ===
The Germans launched their Spring Offensive against Third and Fifth Armies on 21 March, achieving a near-breakthrough. Second Army was not attacked and quickly despatched reinforcements south to help stem the enemy advance. 37th Division went by rail on 28 March, arriving at Hébuterne next day and taking over part of the line on 31 March/1 April; 13th RF went into the front line at Bucquoy. The following morning the enemy tried to rush the bombing posts of No 2 Company but were beaten off. 37th Division came under determined attack on 5 April, the preliminary bombardment from 05.30 practically obliterating the trench positions of Nos 1 and 3 Companies. At 08.45 strong attacks were made on Nos 2 and 3 Companies, whose men were pressed back to their company HQs before a counter-attack restored the position. Neighbouring battalions did not do so well and 13th RF's left was uncovered, so the order was given to retire. The withdrawal of Nos 2 and 3 Companies was covered by the support platoon of No 1 Company, but the withdrawal uncovered the flank of No 1 Company in turn, and a desperate fight developed round Company HQ, which was partially blown in. By 14.00 the line was reorganised with parties from several battalions and the brigade trench mortar battery, and the Germans did not attempt to press home their attack. Lieutenant-Col H.A. Smith was awarded the Distinguished Service Order (DSO) for his skilful handling of a crumbling position. This was the final day of the main offensive (the Battle of the Ancre (1918)), but intermittent shelling, raiding, and bombing by aircraft continued throughout April and May.

=== Hundred Days Offensive ===
The Allies launched their Hundred Days Offensive on 8 August. On 19 August 37th Division moved up to take part in a dawn attack on 21 August at Ablainzevelle. At 04.55 the creeping barrage began, and 13th RF formed up and took its objective on the high ground between Bucquoy and Ablaineville for the loss of only 13 casualties. Two days later 37th Division attacked again at Achiet-le-Grand and Bihucourt with 111th and 112th Bdes. 13th RF on the left met opposition from a brickworks west of Achiet, but Capt Whitehead skilfully outflanked it with No 2 Company, capturing 60 prisoners and 11 light machine guns (he was awarded the DSO). No 3 Company on the right was met by intense fire from machine guns at the top of a railway embankment, which could not be located. However, laying down their own fire the company was able to work round and enfilade this position, one Lewis Gun team rushing forward to take the enemy in the rear. Although the members of this team were picked off one by one, they had so demoralised the enemy that opposition collapsed in the face of a final rush by the company. The dugouts in the adjacent railway cutting were taken one after another, and at least 400 prisoners were taken. The regimental historian described it as 'one of the greatest days experienced by the battalion'. Its work was not yet done: its right flank was still in the air and patrols went 1,000 yards (910 m) down the line without encountering any other troops. Nonetheless, 13th RF crossed the cutting and resumed its advance. Over 1000 prisoners passed through its collecting station that day, while its own casualties over the period 21–27 August were only about 200.

The enemy fell back during the night of 2/3 September, and Third Army followed up. On 4 September 13 RF attempted to carry on the pursuit from near Hermies to a line east of Havrincourt, but after only 200 yards (180 m) was held up by machine guns and trench mortars from the right flank. These were dealt with and the battalion advanced towards the bank of the Canal du Nord, which a platoon crossed at the corner of Havrincourt Wood. However, the 1/1st Hertfordshire Regiment on the right was still lagging and 13th RF was under enfilade fire, so it halted to let the Herts catch up, then advanced and set up its Lewis guns along the canal bank. The right flank was still open, so 13th RF withdrew its right company to a tunnel under the canal to form a flank guard. The battalion had gained 2,500 yards (2,300 m) in the day, and over the next two days its patrols pushed further forward.

37th Division remained on the edge of Havrincourt Wood for the attacks on the Hindenburg Line, beginning on 12 September. On 18 September 13th RF was engaged in a minor action, launching an attack in a rainstorm. The attackers found that the artillery had failed to cut the enemy wire and destroy their bombing blocks. Although the battalion attacked three times it made no progress and had to return to its starting line. A German counter-attack was broken up before it became dangerous, and support from 111th Bde was not needed.

The Allies carried out a series of coordinated attacks along the Western Front on 26–29 September and on 5 October the enemy retreated again, going back to the Beaurevoir Line. 37th Division assaulted this line as part of the Battle of Cambrai on 8 October. 13th Royal Fusiliers' objective was Hurtebise Farm, about 2 miles (3.2 km) north-west of Walincourt. The battalion had to fight its way to its starting line, because Bel Aise Farm and part of the Beaurevoir Line had still not been cleared, and it lost its creeping barrage. However, it then advanced so rapidly that it was within half a mile of its objective before the barrage had suppressed the enemy machine guns on the high ground south of the farm. Nonetheless, Nos 2 and 3 Companies pushed straight on and began to consolidate on their final position by 07.15. However, enemy fire compelled them to withdraw from the south and east sides of the farm until 1/1st Herts passed through to take the next objective. 37th Division's advance now became a pursuit of the beaten enemy to the River Selle. Next day 13th RF followed 1/1st Herts to Ligny-en-Cambrésis and established a line there without opposition. On 10 October 13th RF advanced behind a creeping barrage at 05.20 to establish strongpoints south and east of Caudry, thereby cutting off the town. Most of the opposition came from British tanks and artillery, which did not expect friendly troops to be so far forward. Finding no enemy in front, No 3 Company pushed forward and captured Bethencourt, throwing out a line of outposts to the east overlooking the Selle. The battalion also liberated Caudry, to the delight of some 500 French inhabitants. In three days the battalion had advanced a considerable distance, captured 200 prisoners and 20 machine guns, at a cost of 112 casualties.

The battalion was back in the line on 24 October for the third day of the BEF's next set-piece attack, the Battle of the Selle. After 10th RF had cleared the ground as far as Salesches the day before, 13th RF attacked to the north. Some casualties and confusion were caused by the enemy bombardment as the troops passed through 111th Bde and formed up in the dark, but the battalion advanced at 04.00, with No 3 Company and two platoons of No 2 forming a defensive flank against the enemy still holding the high ground south-west of Salesches station. Shortly after 05.30 No 4 Company was held up by uncut wire, but the advance resumed at 07.00 and two platoons crossed the Écaillon river, wading across west of Ghissignies, where it captured some prisoners. East of Ghissignies the advance encountered heavy fire from a fortified chapel, the leading platoon of No 1 Company being wiped out. The left company was reduced to 40 men and had to be withdrawn to the cover of an orchard, and No 1 Company pulled back to consolidate a line in front of the village by 18.00. Next day 13th RF attempted to advance again, but was held up near De Beart Farm; the battalion was relieved at 21.00. It had advanced nearly 5,000 yards (4,600 m), capturing 120 prisoners and numerous guns and trench mortars, but it had lost another 108 men, and was now reduced to 11 officers and 269 ORs.

The next operation was the Battle of the Sambre. 111th Brigade led off for 37th Division, though 13th RF was already under machine gun fire at 07.35 in Ghissignies while waiting to pass through. Later the battalion had to wait outside Louvignies while 111th Bde completed its capture and 1st Essex came up to lead 112th Bde's attack at 09.40. 13th RF helped the Essex to mop up Jolimetz, and to reduce a machine gun pocket south-west of the village. This took the division to its Red Line, an advance of about 3,000 yards (2,700 m). Then at 15.45, with darkness already approaching, 13th RF took over the lead, plunging into the Forêt de Mormal. With thick undergrowth and spasmodic machine gun fire coming down the railway, the weak battalion made slow progress. By 18.00 it had four platoons at the crossroads by the railway, destroying a machine gun team and establishing a strongpoint. It then threw out outposts to contact 8th Somerset Light Infantry to the south-west. No 9 Platoon under Sergeant W. Green, however, was out of contact, having pushed on through the wood in darkness until it reached a road junction at the edge of the woods, 1,000 yards (910 m) in front of the rest of the battalion. Green and his men, completely isolated, dug in and threw out patrols, finding neither friend nor foe, until 5th Division passed through to continue the advance next morning. (Green was awarded the Distinguished Conduct Medal (DCM).)

13th Royal Fusiliers had fought its last battle; after 5th Division took over on 5 November, 37th concentrated in billets. On 11 November the division moved back to Caudry, and during the march the men were told that the Armistice with Germany had come into force at 11.00, bringing hostilities to an end.

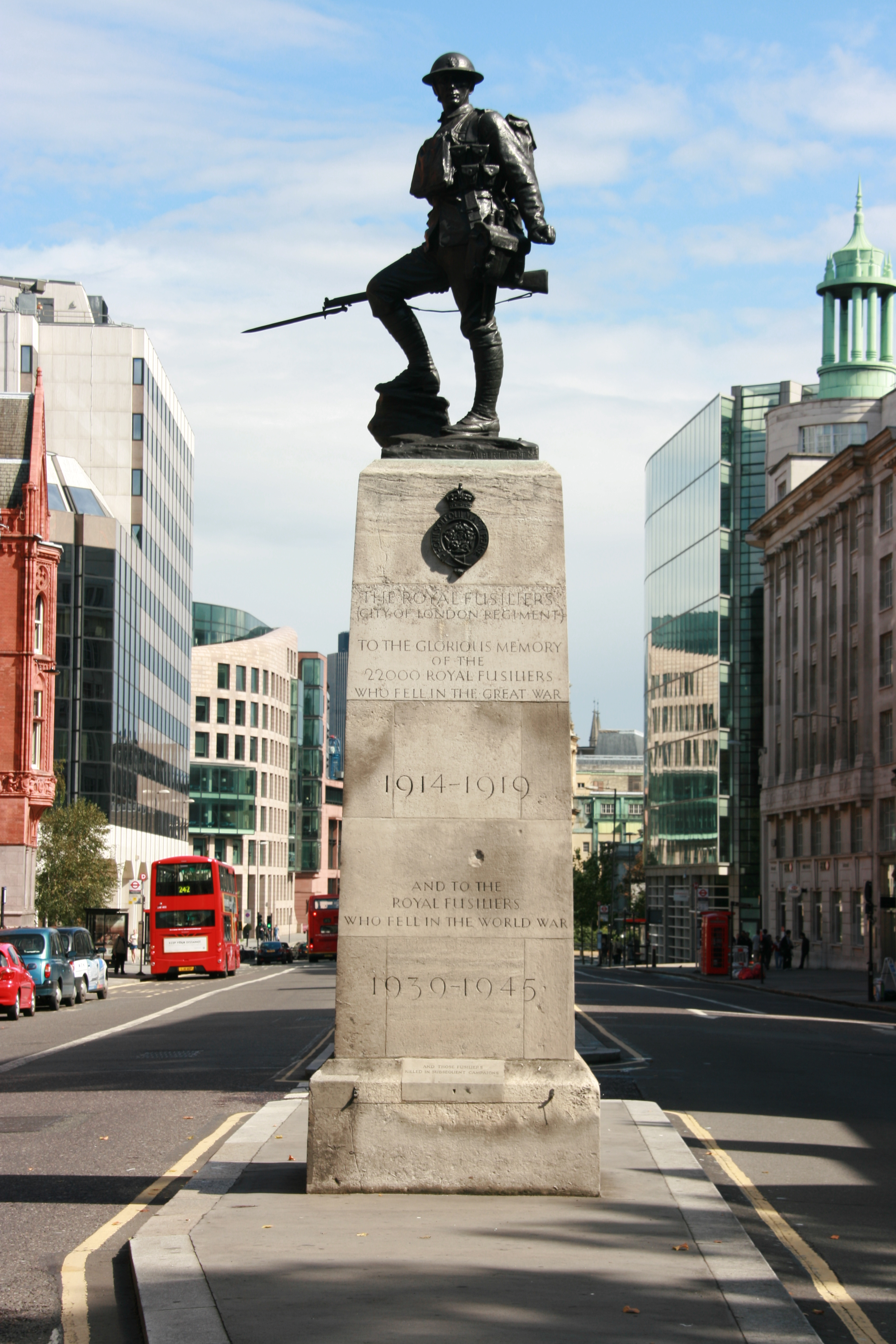
Royal Fusiliers War Memorial on High Holborn.

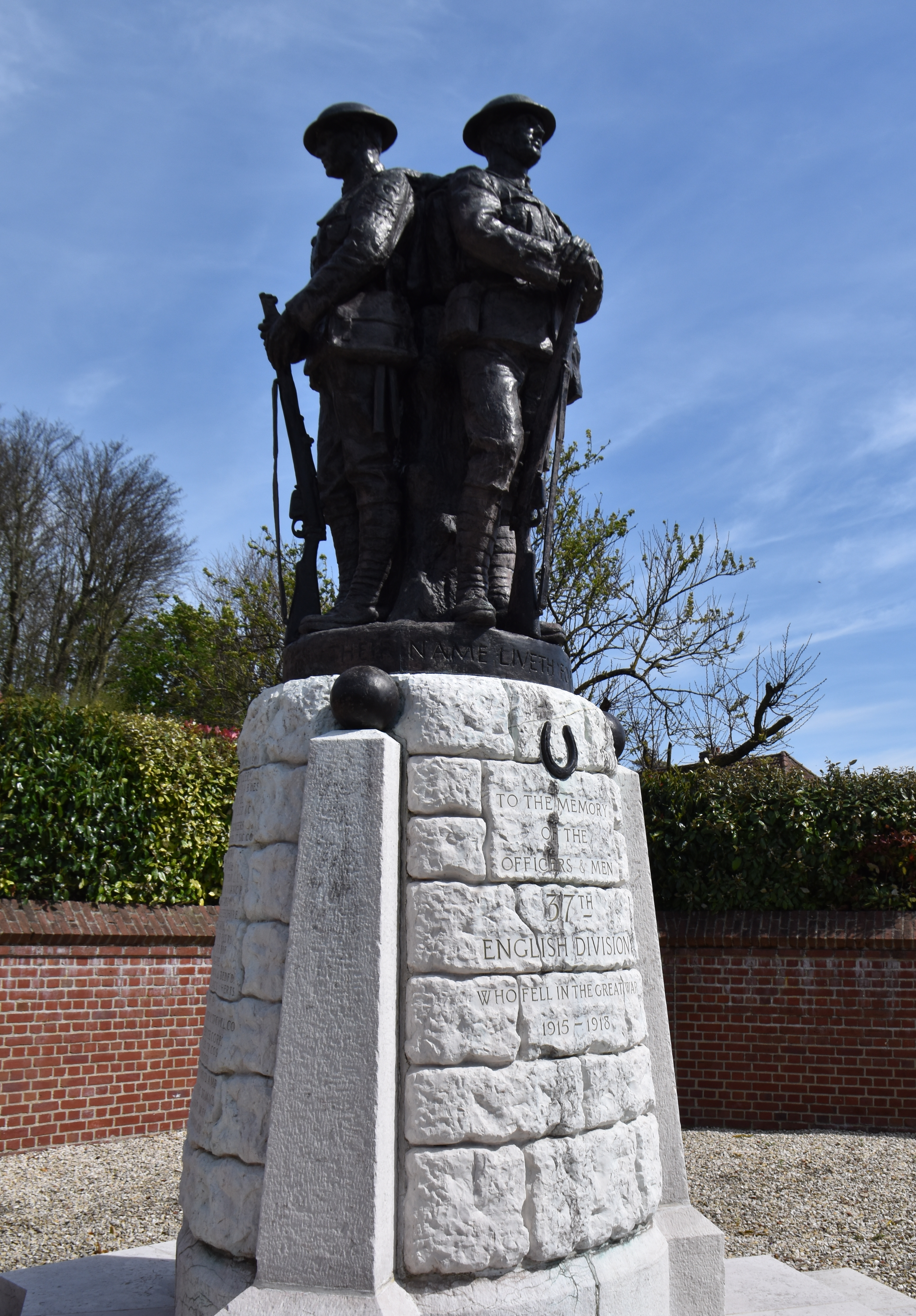
37th Division memorial at Monchy-le-Preux.

=== Postwar ===
The units of 37th Division were now employed in training, education and recreation. On 1 December they began a long move to an area north of Charleroi, but from 2 to 14 December were billeted north of Le Quesnoy in bad weather until the march could resume. On 20 December the division settled into its final billets near Charleroi. Demobilisation began in December. Remaining duties included guarding the supply railhead at Rœux. 37th Division ceased to exist on 25 March 1919 and the cadre of the battalion returned to the UK. It was disbanded on 17 May at Glencorse Barracks, near Edinburgh.

== Memorials ==
The Royal Fusiliers War Memorial, with its bronze figure of a Fusilier sculpted by Albert Toft, stands at Holborn Bar on the boundary of the City of London. A panel on the back of the pedestal lists all the RF battalions.

The 37th Division memorial sculpted by Lady Feodora Gleichen (sister of the division's first commander) was erected at Monchy-le-Preux.

== Insignia ==
The battalion wore the Royal Fusiliers' cap badge of a Tudor rose on a 'grenade' and brass shoulder-titles. For a period in 1916 the badge was painted on the front of the steel helmet and a unique shoulder title was worn, with a grenade over '13' over 'RF'. Men of 13th RF wore 37th Division's formation sign on the upper arm. Originally this was a gold horseshoe pointing downwards; in November 1916 this was changed to point upwards. In July 1916 the Division adopted a system of 'battle patches' on the upper arm to identify individual units. As the second battalion of its brigade, 13th RF would have worn a coloured rectangle; for 111th Bde this was dark blue. From October 1916 the men also wore a company sign of a horizontal bar beneath the rectangle: red for A Company, dark blue for B, purple for C and green for D. As the senior battalion of 112th Bde from February 1918 13th RF would have adopted a red disc in place of the blue rectangle. From late July 1917 the 'gold horseshoe' was included in this scheme, worn above the other flashes on both sleeves.
