= Sidney Goodall Francis =

Brigadier-General Sidney Goodall Francis DSO*
- Born: 24 December 1874
- Died: 29 March 1955 (aged 80); Sway, Hampshire
- Military career
- Allegiance: United Kingdom
- Branch: British Army
- Service years: 1895 - 1925
- Rank: Brigadier-General
- Units: West Yorkshire Regiment; Royal Berkshire Regiment
- Conflicts: Second Boer War; First World War
- Awards: DSO & Bar

Brigadier-General Sidney Goodall Francis DSO & Bar (24 December 1874 – 29 March 1955) was a senior British Army officer during the First World War.

== Biography ==
Born on 24 December 1874, Sidney Goodall Francis was educated at Bedford School. He received his first commission as a second lieutenant in the West Yorkshire Regiment in 1895, served during the Second Boer War, between 1899 and 1902, and received the Distinguished Service Order in 1900. He was promoted to the rank of captain in August 1904, (although the date of his promotion was later antedated to April 1904) serving on the North West Frontier and during the Mohmand Expedition of 1908.

He served during the First World War, was promoted to the rank of major in September 1915, and was appointed as a GSO3 in October, to the temporary rank of lieutenant colonel in February 1916, when he took command of a battalion of the Royal Irish Rifles (later the Royal Ulster Rifles), and to the temporary rank of brigadier general in 1917. He received a second Distinguished Service Order in 1918.

He was appointed commanding officer of the 1st Battalion, Royal Berkshire Regiment, in 1920.

Francis retired from the British Army on 3 June 1925 and was granted the honorary rank of brigadier general and promoted to lieutenant colonel at the same time, with seniority backdated to 8 December 1916.

He died in Sway, Hampshire, on 29 March 1955, at the age of 80.
