= Humbercamps =

- Commune
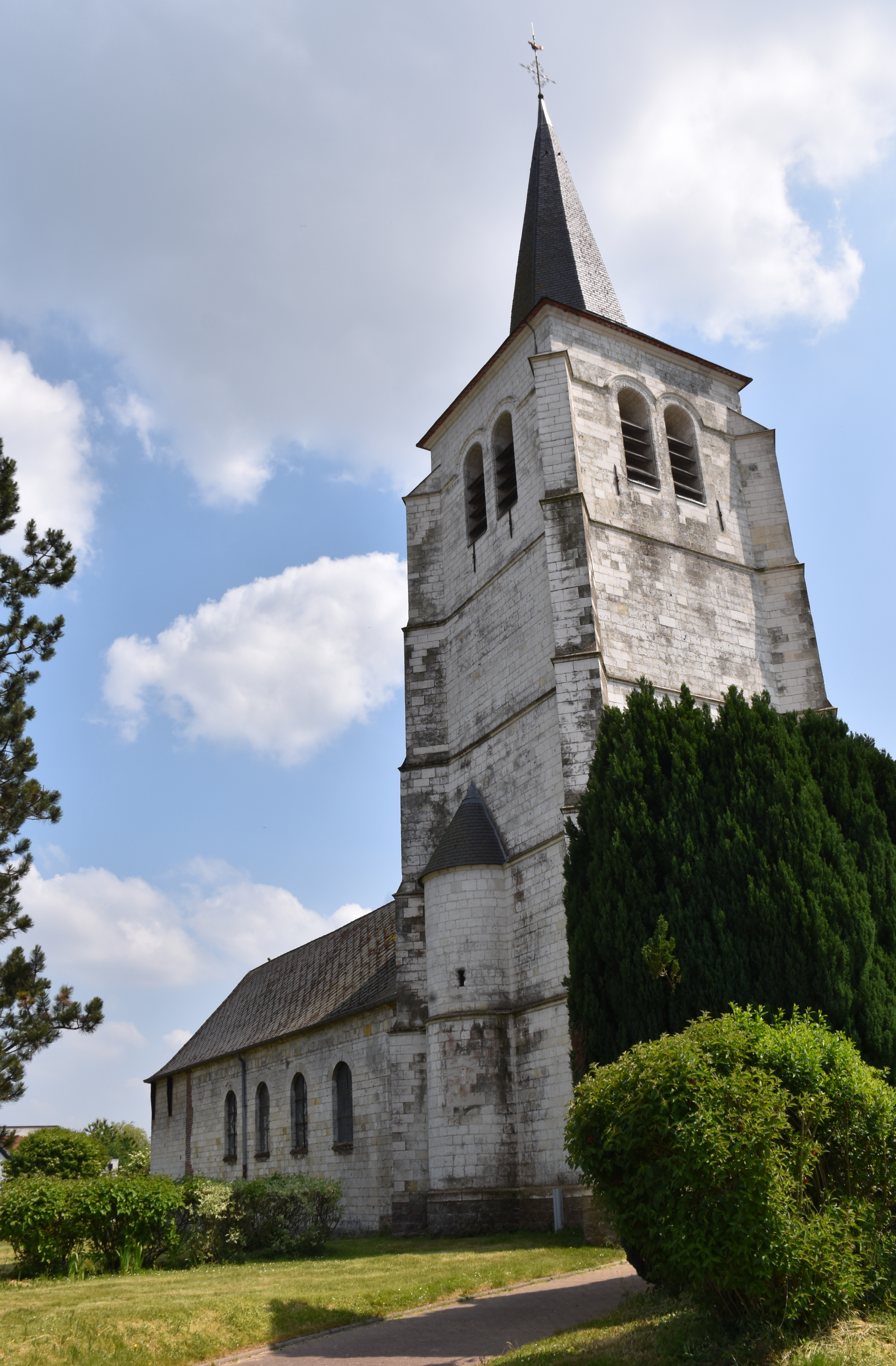
- The church of Humbercamps

- Coat of arms
- Location of Humbercamps
- Location within France Location within Hauts-de-France
- Coordinates: 50°11′09″N 2°34′30″E
- Country: France
- Region: Hauts-de-France
- Department: Pas-de-Calais
- Arrondissement: Arras
- Canton: Avesnes-le-Comte
- Intercommunality: CC Campagnes de l'Artois

Government
  - Mayor (2020–2026): Dominique Verdel
- Area^{1}: 3.58 km^{2} (1.38 sq mi)
- Elevation: 168 m (551 ft)
- Highest elevation: 172 m (564 ft)
- Lowest elevation: 148 m (486 ft)
- Population (2023): 219
  - Density: 61.2/km^{2} (158/sq mi)
- Time zone: UTC+01:00 (CET)
  - Summer (DST): UTC+02:00 (CEST)
- INSEE/Postal code: 62465 /62158
- ^{1} French Land Register data, which excludes lakes, ponds, glaciers > 1 km^{2} (0.386 sq mi or 247 acres) and river estuaries.

Humbercamps (French pronunciation: [œ̃bɛʁkɑ̃]) is a commune in the Pas-de-Calais department in the Hauts-de-France region of France.

== Geography ==
Humbercamps is a farming village situated 13 miles (21 km) southwest of Arras, at the junction of the D26 and the D30 roads.

== Population ==
Historical population
| Year | Pop. | ±% p.a. |
|---|---|---|
| 1968 | 262 | — |
| 1975 | 240 | −1.25% |
| 1982 | 254 | +0.81% |
| 1990 | 266 | +0.58% |
| 1999 | 251 | −0.64% |
| 2007 | 230 | −1.09% |
| 2012 | 232 | +0.17% |
| 2017 | 218 | −1.24% |
| 2023 | 219 | +0.08% |
Source: INSEE

== Places of interest ==
- The church of St. Barthélemy, dating from the seventeenth century.
- The Commonwealth War Graves Commission cemetery.

== See also ==
- Communes of the Pas-de-Calais department
