= Hébuterne =

- Commune
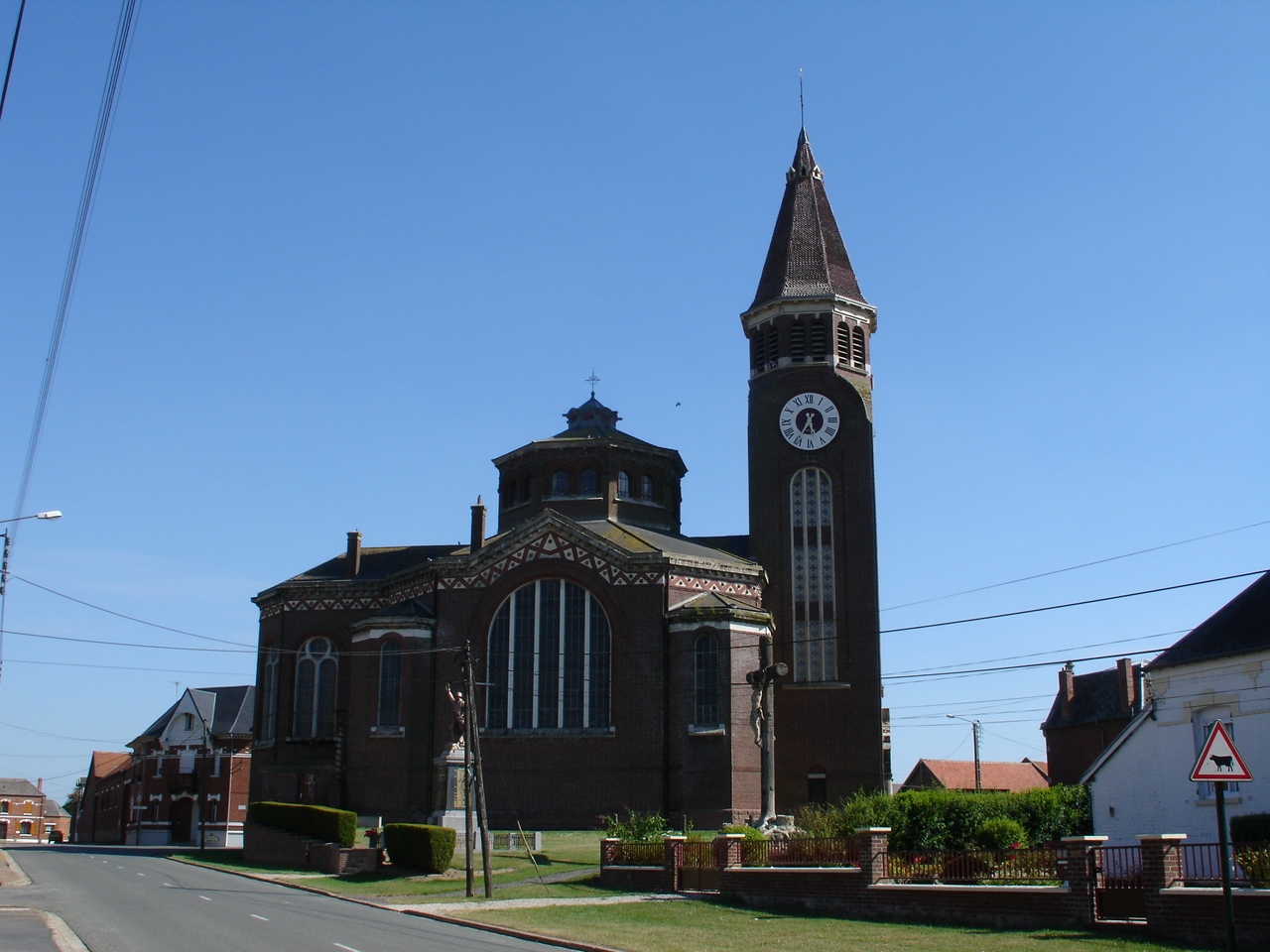
- The church of Hébuterne

- Coat of arms
- Location of Hébuterne
- Location within France Location within Hauts-de-France
- Coordinates: 50°07′34″N 2°38′11″E
- Country: France
- Region: Hauts-de-France
- Department: Pas-de-Calais
- Arrondissement: Arras
- Canton: Avesnes-le-Comte
- Intercommunality: CC Sud-Artois

Government
  - Mayor (2020–2026): Denis Caron
- Area^{1}: 11.04 km^{2} (4.26 sq mi)
- Elevation: 144 m (472 ft)
- Highest elevation: 156 m (512 ft)
- Lowest elevation: 114 m (374 ft)
- Population (2023): 526
  - Density: 47.6/km^{2} (123/sq mi)
- Time zone: UTC+01:00 (CET)
  - Summer (DST): UTC+02:00 (CEST)
- INSEE/Postal code: 62422 /62111
- ^{1} French Land Register data, which excludes lakes, ponds, glaciers > 1 km^{2} (0.386 sq mi or 247 acres) and river estuaries.

Hébuterne (French pronunciation: [ebytɛʁn]) is a commune in the Pas-de-Calais department in the Hauts-de-France region of France 24 kilometres (15 miles) southwest of Arras.

== History ==
Formerly within the ancient county of Artois, the village was redesignated within the new Department of the Pas de Calais after the French Revolution.

== First World War ==
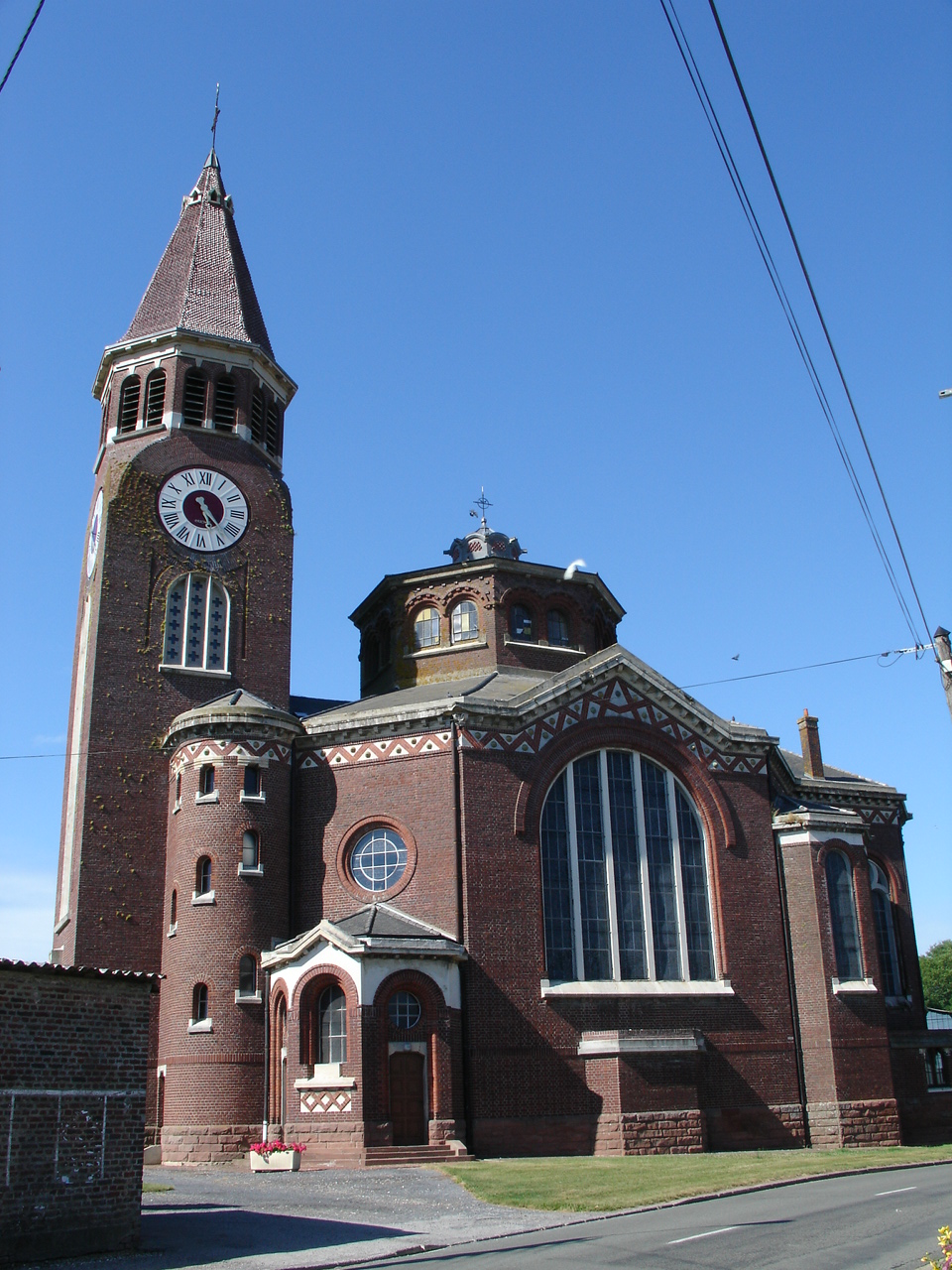
The rebuilt church

For most of the First World War, Hébuterne was in the front line of the Western Front and occupied by the Allied Forces entrenched on the eastern side of the village facing the Imperial German Army 800 yards beyond occupying the village of Gommecourt. In mid-summer 1916, the 56th (London) Division of the British Army carried out an attack from Hébuterne in an attempt to capture Gommecourt as a part of the Battle of the Somme offensive, which failed with severe losses.

== Population ==
Historical population
Year	Pop.	±% p.a.
1968	575	—
1975	516	−1.53%
1982	486	−0.85%
1990	456	−0.79%
1999	465	+0.22%
2007	542	+1.93%
2012	517	−0.94%
2017	524	+0.27%
2023	526	+0.06%
Source: INSEE

== See also ==
- Communes of the Pas-de-Calais department
