= 63rd Brigade (United Kingdom) =

Formation in the British Army during World War I

The 63rd Brigade was a formation of the British Army. It was raised as part of the new army also known as Kitchener's Army and assigned to the 21st Division and served on the Western Front during the First World War. In July 1916 the brigade was transferred to the 37th Division.

== Formation ==
The infantry battalions did not all serve at once, but all were assigned to the brigade during the war.

- 8th Battalion, Lincolnshire Regiment
- 8th Battalion, Somerset Light Infantry
- 12th Battalion, West Yorkshire Regiment
- 10th Battalion, York & Lancaster Regiment
- 4th Battalion, Middlesex Regiment
- 63rd Machine Gun Company
- 63rd Trench Mortar Battery
