= 101st Brigade (United Kingdom) =

- Active: 5 November 1914–10 April 1915; 27 April 1915–June 1919
- Allegiance: United Kingdom
- Branch: New Army
- Type: Infantry
- Size: Brigade
- Part of: 34th Division
- Engagements: Battle of the Somme; Battle of Arras; Hargicourt; Third Battle of Ypres; German spring offensive Battle of Soissons; Hundred Days Offensive

Commanders
- Notable commanders: Brig-Gen Hugh Gregory Fitton; Brig-Gen Robert Clements Gore

The 101st Brigade was an infantry formation of the British Army during World War I. It was raised as part of 'Kitchener's Army' and was assigned to the 34th Division. After the original formation was converted into a reserve brigade, the number was transferred to a brigade of 'Pals battalions'. The brigade landed in France with 34th Division at the end of 1915 and then served on the Western Front for the rest of the war, seeing action at the Somme – when its battalions were shattered on the First Day – and at Arras and Ypres. Virtually destroyed during the German spring offensive of 1918, the brigade was reconstituted with new units in time to take part in the final battles of the war.

== Original 101st Brigade ==
Alfred Leete's recruitment poster for Kitchener's Army.

On 6 August 1914, less than 48 hours after Britain's declaration of war, Parliament sanctioned an increase of 500,000 men for the Regular British Army. The newly-appointed Secretary of State for War, Earl Kitchener of Khartoum, issued his famous call to arms: 'Your King and Country Need You', urging the first 100,000 volunteers to come forward. This group of six divisions with supporting arms became known as Kitchener's First New Army, or 'K1'. The K2 and K3 battalions, brigades and divisions followed soon afterwards. So far, the battalions had all been formed at the depots of their parent regiments, but recruits had also been flooding in to the Special Reserve (SR) battalions (the former Militia). These were deployed at their war stations in coastal defence where they were training and equipping reservists to provide reinforcement drafts to the Regular Army fighting overseas. The SR battalions were soon well above their establishment strength and on 8 October 1914 the War Office (WO) ordered each SR battalion to use the surplus to form a service battalion of the 4th New Army ('K4'). In November K4 battalions were organised into 18 brigades numbered from 89 to 106 and formed into the 30th–35th Divisions.

Initially, the K4 units remained in the coast defences alongside their parent SR battalions. On 5 November 1914 four K4 battalions defending the Cromarty Firth were ordered to be formed into 101st Brigade in 34th Division:

- 12th (Service) Battalion, Scottish Rifles
- 11th (Service) Battalion, Black Watch
- 10th (Service) Battalion, Seaforth Highlanders
- 8th (Service) Battalion, Cameron Highlanders

On 4 December Brigadier-General S.B. Jameson was appointed to command the brigade. The units began training for active service, but the lack of uniforms, weapons, equipment and instructors that had been experienced by the K1–K3 units was even greater for those of K4, and by April 1915 their training was still at an elementary stage. On 10 April 1915 the War Office decided to convert the K4 battalions into reserve units, to provide drafts for the K1–K3 battalions in the same way that the SR was doing for the Regular battalions. The K4 divisions were broken up and the brigades were renumbered: 101st Brigade became 13th Reserve Brigade.

== New 101st Brigade ==
Formation sign of the 34th Division

In June 1915 a new 101st Brigade was formed and assigned to the former 41st Division, now renumbered 34th Division. It consisted of K5 units that had been forming since late 1914. These were largely raised by local initiative rather than at regimental depots, and were known as 'Pals battalions':

- 15th (Service) Battalion, Royal Scots (1st Edinburgh) – raised by the Lord Provost and City of Edinburgh in September 1914, though about half the men came from Manchester and sometimes known as the Manchester Scottish
- 16th (Service) Battalion, Royal Scots (2nd Edinburgh) – raised at Edinburgh largely from footballers and football supporters by Lt-Col Sir George McCrae, MP, and known as 'McCrae's Battalion'
- 10th (Service) Battalion, Lincolnshire Regiment (Grimsby) – raised by the Mayor and Town of Grimsby on 9 September 1914 and known as the 'Grimsby Chums'; transferred from original 115th Bde
- 11th (Service) Battalion, Suffolk Regiment (Cambridgeshire) – raised at Cambridge by the Cambridge and Isle of Ely Territorial Force Association on 25 September 1914

The rest of 34th Division consisted of battalions of the Northumberland Fusiliers (NF), organised as 102nd (Tyneside Scottish) and 103rd (Tyneside Irish) Bdes. 101st Brigade assembled at Fountains Abbey in North Yorkshire with Brigadier-Gen Hugh Fitton transferred from commanding the Tyne Garrison to take command. Training was hampered by the same lack of equipment as the other Kitchener units, but between 28 and 31 August 1915 the 34th Division concentrated on Salisbury Plain for final battle training. On 13 December it was ordered to mobilise for service in Egypt, but these orders were rescinded on 26 December and instead the division embarked for France to join the British Expeditionary Force (BEF) fighting on the Western Front. Entrainment for the embarkation ports began on 7 January 1916 and on 15 January it completed its concentration round La Crosse, near Saint-Omer.

== Service ==
Brigadier-Gen Fitton was mortally wounded during a reconnaissance of the front line on 18 January, and Col Charles Somerset of 11th Suffolks had to deputise until 28 January, when Lt-Col Robert Gore of the Argyll and Sutherland Highlanders arrived to take command. 34th Division went into reserve behind III Corps. Parties of all arms were then sent into the line with 8th and 23rd Divisions to learn the routines of trench warfare. On 24 February the division took over its own sector of the front line. 207th (Norfolk) Field Company under Major MacMahon was attached to 101st Bde and billeted in Erquinghem.

The brigade was joined by its support troops in early 1916:

- 101st Brigade Machine Gun (MG) Company – formed at Grantham on 21 February 1916, disembarked at Le Havre on 26 March and joined next day
- 101st Trench Mortar Battery (TMB) – formed by 6 July from:
  - A/101 TMB formed by 18 February, redesignated 101/1 TMB on 10 March
  - 101/2 TMB formed by 10 April

The TMBs were manned by troops drawn from the infantry battalions.

On 7 April 34th Division was relieved in the line and went to the Second Army training area behind St Omer. Early in May it proceeded by route march and train to Albert in the Somme sector, where it rejoined III Corps, which had moved south to prepare for the forthcoming 'Big Push' (the Battle of the Somme).

=== First day on the Somme ===
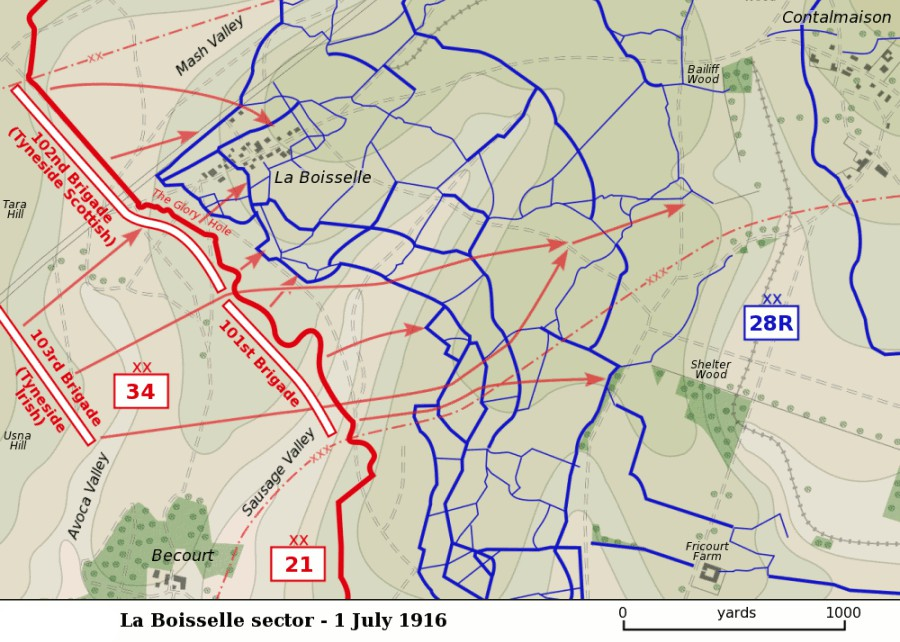
34th Division's attack on Sausage Valley, 1 July 1916.

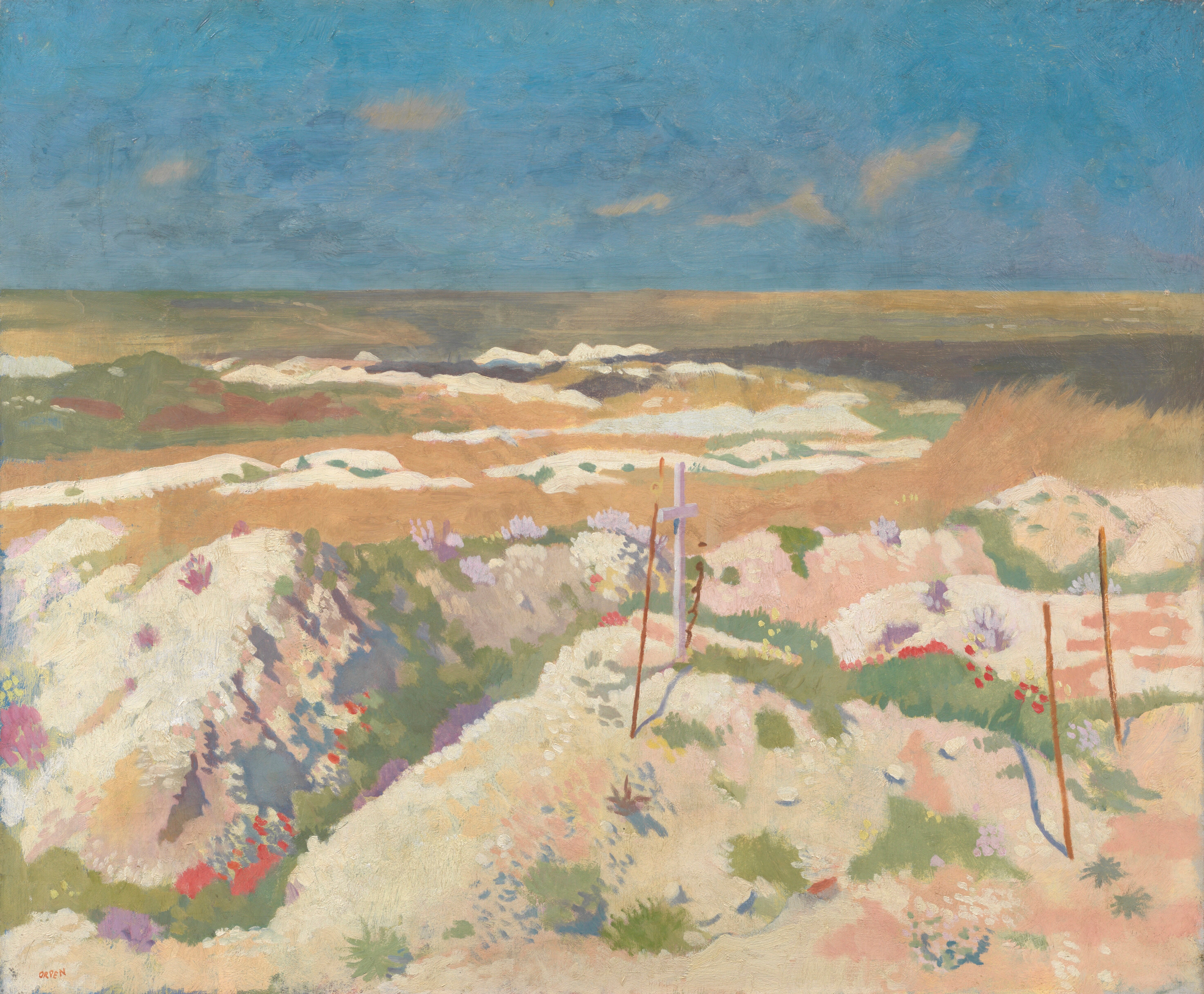
A Grave and a Mine Crater at La Boisselle, by William Orpen.

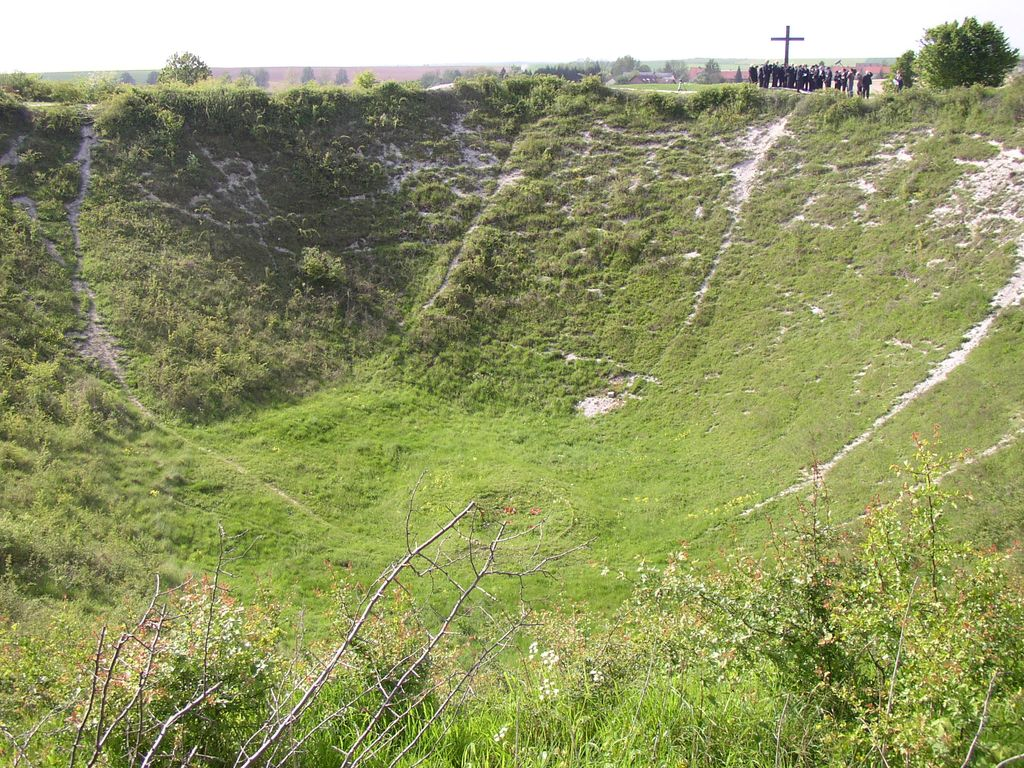
Lochnagar Crater, present day.

The First day on the Somme was the first offensive operation for 34th Division. Attacking on the right of III Corps, its objectives (recognised as being ambitious) were the Capture of La Boisselle and an advance of 3,500 yards (3,200 m) almost to Contalmaison, crossing six successive trench lines. The bombardment began on 25 June but bad weather hindered artillery observation so the bombardment was extended by two days and the attack was postponed until 1 July. The battalions moved into their assembly trenches between 05.00 and 07.00 as the artillery began their final bombardment. 34th Division was to attack with 102nd Bde on the left, 101st on the right, each brigade forming two columns. 101st Brigade's left hand column consisted of the 10th Lincolns in the first wave, followed by the 11th Suffolks to pass through and capture the second objective, 2,000 yards (1,800 m) ahead, then 24th NF (1st Tyneside Irish) of 103rd Bde to go on to the final objective. The right column was led by 15th Royal Scots (RS), followed by 16th RS then 27th NF (4th Tyneside Irish) of 103rd Bde. The brigade's line of attack ran up 'Sausage Valley', overlooked to the north by the Schwabenhöhe fortification outside La Boisselle and to the south by the Heligoland strongpoint (known as 'Sausage Redoubt' to the British) projecting into No man's land, with 'Scots Redoubt' on the Fricourt Ridge behind it. However, the 179th Tunnelling Company, Royal Engineers (RE), had placed a huge mine under the Schwabenhöhe (the Lochnagar mine), which was fired at 07.28, 2 minutes before Zero. This obliterated a section of the German defences and created a very large crater. All three waves of the attacking columns went 'over the top' on time, at 07.30 for 101st Bde's right hand column, at 07.35 for the left column to allow the mine debris to settle (a few casualties were suffered from falling blocks of chalk).

The attack of the left column was a disaster. The German defences had not been suppressed by the long bombardment, and although some of the 10th Lincolns were able to rush forward and occupy Lochnagar crater before the Germans, they and the 11th Suffolks following them up Sausage Valley were shot down by German machine gun teams who came out of their deep dugouts as soon as the British barrage lifted. Many of the following waves suffered heavy casualties before they had even crossed the British front line. The 11th Suffolks was also hit by a weak counter-barrage that the Germans put down on the British front line. The 10th Lincolns and 11th Suffolks had 500 yards (460 m) of open ground to cross before they reached the main German line, and the waves were soon reduced to small groups of men. The Official History estimated that the leading battalions lost 80 per cent of their men in the first 10 minutes. The survivors took what cover they could on the open fire-swept zone, which the Germans worked over systematically with shellfire and machine guns, as they did with the new crater. The carrying parties with ammunition and bombs were unable to cross. The following 1st Tyneside Irish were ordered to halt once they reached the old British line rather than be thrown away in the same way.

The right column made better progress: 15th RS had crept within 200 yards (180 m) of the German front trenches on the slope ahead under cover of the final bombardment, and overran them quickly. However the flanking machine gun fire from La Boisselle and Sausage Valley pushed the leading companies to the right and practically destroyed the left wings of the following companies of 15th and 16th RS. They thus passed by Sausage Redoubt and Scots Redoubt as they moved up the Fricourt Spur, leaving inadequate parties to mop them up. They only discovered their faulty direction when, after advancing nearly 1 mile (1.6 km) and crossing the German first intermediate line, they reached 'Birch Tree Lane' where they ran into troops of 21st Division advancing on their right. To correct their direction, the 15th RS now worked leftwards along 'Birch Tree Trench' in the German second intermediate line towards Peake Woods while 16th RS took up a supporting position along a sunken road. According to German reports a party of 16th RS got as far as Contalmaison village, where they were annihilated. However, the Germans now counter-attacked from Peake Woods, while machine gun fire was opened on the RS from the bypassed redoubts in the rear. Both battalions had to fall back. By 10.00 there were two isolated parties holding out, one under Captain Armit of 16th RS, the other under Captain Osbert Brown of 11th Suffolks, who was commanding a group of 15th and 16th RS, 4th Tyneside Irish and 11th Suffolks. These parties held out all day, guarding the left flank of 21st Division, but no reinforcements or supplies could get through to them.

Seven out of eight battalion commanding officers in 102nd and 103rd Bdes had become casualties (as well as the commander of 103rd Bde), but Brig-Gen Gore had ordered the COs of 101st Bde to stand fast with their battalion HQs when their men advanced. That evening Brig-Gen Gore sent Lt-Col Sir George McCrae of 16th RS forward with his battalion HQ to organise all the troops of 34th Division in this part of the battlefield (now about 300 men in Wood Lane), After dark parties of the divisional pioneer battalion (18th NF (1st Tyneside Pioneers)) and REs got across No man's land with water and ammunition, and helped to improve the defences. By morning McCrae had received about 400 reinforcements from 101st and 103rd Bdes, including about 140 of the 11th Suffolks. During 2 July these parties completed the capture of Scots and Sausage Redoubts. The division was withdrawn on the night of 3/4 July.

The 34th Division suffered more infantry casualties than any other division on 1 July 1916, those of 101st Bde amounting to 2299 all ranks killed, wounded and missing, most of whom were dead. Although 34th Division went back into the line on 10 July, it was with two infantry brigades borrowed from another division, only 101st of its own brigades remaining throughout. However 101st Bde missed the Battle of Bazentin Ridge (14–7 July) because it had not sufficiently recovered for offensive action and it stayed in Hénencourt Wood refitting. The battalions received reinforcements including 'Derby men' with only three months' training.

=== Pozières ===
On 31 July the brigade returned to the line at Bazentin-le-Petit. The Battle of Pozières Ridge was just beginning, and III Corps was attacking towards High Wood. The brigade was thrown into bitter fighting for 'Intermediate Trench', only half of which was held by the British. 16th RS attempted to bomb their way westwards along the trench on the night of 1/2 August, but were unsuccessful. An attack at 23.00 on 2 August gained 100 yards (91 m). A new attack was made by two companies each of 16th RS and 11th Suffolks at 01.10 on 4 August, supported by a short intense bombardment. One company of the Suffolks made it in to the trench easily, but the other failed to get into position and the men did not leave their trenches under the German counter-barrage; nor did the RS aligned on them. 16th RS tried again at 04.45, but it was getting light and they only advanced 30 yards (27 m) before being pinned down. The pioneers were unable to make much progress in digging a communication trench across No man's land to Intermediate Trench. Isolated, the Suffolk company was ordered to withdraw after 4 hours in the trench, having suffered around 100 casualties.The following evening 15th RS assisted by a bombing party of 11th Suffolks made a fresh attack, but this also failed undef a crushing German barrage. Next day the 15th RS lost and then regained sections of trench in bombing fights. 101st Brigade was relieved under shellfire on the evening of 6 August, and suffered casualties from shelling on 12 August while in the support line. further casualties from heavy shellfire on 12 August

On 15 August 34th Division left the Somme and marched back to the Armentières sector, where it spent the rest of the year routinely holding the line at Bois-Grenier, with regular trench raids.

=== Arras ===
On 26 January 1917 the division was suddenly rushed from Armentières to go into reserve at Méteren in case the Germans attacked over the now-frozen marshes north of Boezinge. This did not happen, but the division underwent three weeks' training there for the forthcoming offensive before moving to the Arras sector to continue preparations. The First Battle of the Scarpe launched the Arras Offensive at 05.30 on 9 April. 34th Division was to assault three successive lines of German trenches, designated the Black, Blue and Brown lines, the Black being 80–150 yards (73–137 m) in front of the start line, the Brown about 500–600 yards (460–550 m) away. Each brigade would attack with two battalions in line, the other two in support and reserve respectively. 101st Brigade's leading battalions were 16th RS on the right and 11th Suffolks on the left. Neither battalion had any difficulty reaching the Black Line behind the creeping barrage, A Company of 11th Suffolks reporting that they gained it without loss. In fact, the two leading battalions had slightly overrun their objective, and in avoiding the German counter-barrage the 15th RS in support had come forward too soon and were intermingled with them, so they moved on to the second objective (the Blue Line along the Arras–Lille railway) without reorganising. This was also taken easily and 11th Suffolks stopped to consolidate while 15th RS went forward in disorganised fashion. but still took the Brown Line on time. There were signs of hasty flight in the German dugouts, and there was little in front of 101st Bde: it is possible that it could have captured Gavrelle in the far distance had it pressed on regardless. By evening 16th RS and 10th Lincolns were firmly holding the Brown Line and the brigade was digging in on the Green Line just beyond them. Next day patrols took some prisoners and overran some bogged-down damaged guns, but 101st Bde could not advance because flanking formations had still not reached the Green Line. As the brigade secured its position over the following days amidst snowstorms it was subjected to heavy shelling, including gas shells. Large numbers of men also had to be evacuated sick because of the bad weather and there were some deaths from exposure. 101st Brigade moved back to billets in Arras on the night of 14/15 April.

The brigade returned to the line while the Second Battle of the Scarpe was being fought. During the evening of 23 April it took up position in the railway cutting of the Blue Line of 9 April and next day 34th Division relieved 51st (Highland) Division in front. 101st Brigade, with its right flank on the River Scarpe, had the village of Rœux to its front. On the evening of 25 April the support line was heavily bombarded. On 28 April 34th Division launched its attack as part of the Battle of Arleux. 101st brigade had 15th RS next to the river, 10th Lincolns in the centre, and 11the Suffolks on the left, with 16th RS following as 'moppers-up', two companies behind 15th RS and one each behind the other battalions. Zero hour was 04.22. Because of the difficulty of following a creeping barrage through the buildings of Rœux, the barrage on 34th Division's front would advance in a series of timed lifts. However, the barrage was less accurate than on 9 April and one trench in front of Rœux was not touched at all. 15th RS made good progress, but the rest of the brigade walked into intense machine gun fire, which stopped 10th Lincolns.. Some of the Suffolks got into the houses near the chemical works but part of a company was cut off by Germans emerging from a tunnel in its rear, the company commander and his HQ being forced to surrender when their ammunition ran out. The CO of 11th Suffolks found 5 officers and about 300 ORs in the front line (including 2 officers and 60 ORs of 15th RS) and reorganised them to face a German counter-attack. This came in at 08.00, and most of the 11th Suffolks still out in front were driven back to their start line (although some remained in the buildings until nightfall and returned with prisoners). Some 200 Germans penetrated into the British front line but were stopped by Sergeant McCrea and his moppers-up of 16th RS and then driven out by Lewis gun fire and bombing parties from 10th Lincolns and 20th NF from the flanks, and the fire of 101st TMB. 15th RS and the moppers-up got caught up in fighting in a wood, and were pinned down overnight. They were driven back by a counter-attack next morning, with heavy casualties. By the end of 28 April 101st Bde (including 20th NF) only had 25 officers and 790 ORs in the line. 11th Suffolks were withdrawn to the support line so that the British heavy artillery could bombard the chemical works, and then reoccupied the front trench, providing guides for the two Tyneside Scottish battalions tasked with renewing the attack in the morning. This also failed.

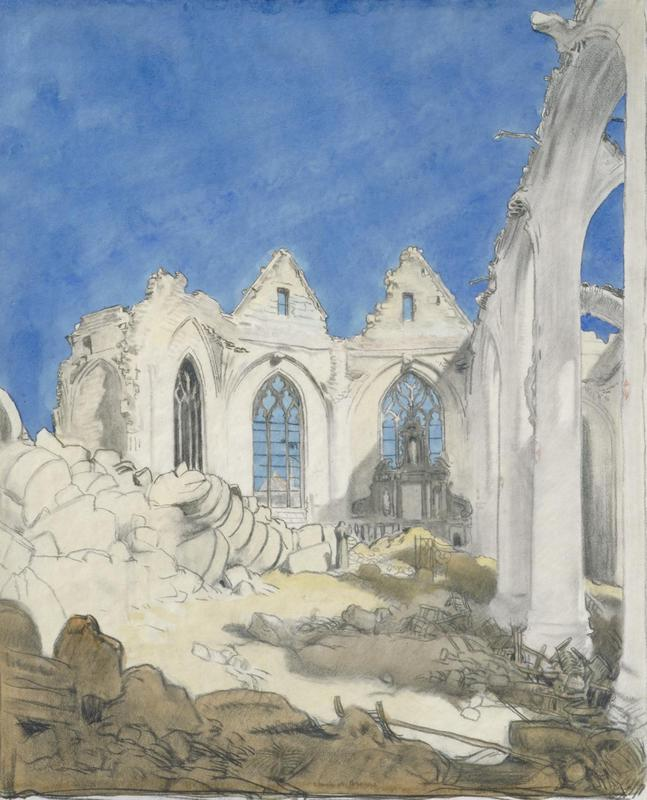
The Church, Péronne, by William Orpen, depicting the destruction carried out by German troops as they retreated to the Hindenburg Line in 1917.

=== Hargicourt ===
34th Division was relieved on 1 May and spent the rest of the month resting and training, with 101st Bde round Pernois. Reinforcements were scarce: consequently battalions of 34th Division were temporarily reduced from four to three companies, and those of 15th RS could only find enough men for three platoons of three sections instead of four of each. 34th Division went back into the line on 30 May, 101st Bde on the right finding the communication trenches almost impassable because of summer rainstorms. 102nd Brigade relieved 101st on 4/5 June and carried out a minor operation to capture some trenches on the slope of Greenland Hill. 101st Brigade then came back on 7 June to take over the captured trenches. In line with the recent training, the night outposts were placed far out into No man's land. Following that tour the division moved to the Péronne sector where after a spending a few days clearing the destruction in the liberated town the following weeks consisted of spells in the line interspersed with training for the next operation. For 101st Bde this was to be at Hargicourt. It was a minor operation planned in great detail, one of a number of such attacks being carried out as diversions from that summer's main Ypres Offensive. The attack was carefully rehearsed behind the lines where turf had been cut to represent the enemy trenches. In addition to his own brigade Brig-Gen Gore was given the 20th and 23rd NF, 207th Field Company, RE, and two mortars from 102nd Bde's TMB; 102nd Bde also loaned four infantry companies for carrying parties. The objectives were 'Malakoff Farm' and the adjoining trench system on Cologne Ridge in front of Hargicourt, about 2,000 yards (1,800 m) in front of the Hindenburg Line proper. The capture of these positions would reduce German observation over British positions. Gore put all four of his battalions into the line, from right to left: 15th RS, 16th RS, 10th Lincolns, 11th Suffolks; 20th NF was in reserve behind a railway embankment, and 23rd NF would send a company bombing up 'Rifle Pit Trench' to link up with the outer flank of the Suffolks; each attacking battalion had a carrying party from 102nd Bde. On 24 August the battalions moved into the front and support lines, which here were not continuous trenches but strings of outposts, and No man's land was unusually wide, patrolled by both sides at night. The artillery had been firing preparatory bombardments, and on 25 August fired a 'Chinese' (fake) barrage to discover where the German retaliatory fire would fall when the real attack went in.

During the night of 25/26 August a party from each attacking battalion laid a tape in No man's land, close to the enemy, and the troops formed up on this line in silence. The barrage came down at 04.30 on 26 August and the assaulting waves closed up to it. After four minutes the barrage lifted 50 yards (46 m) forward and then began to creep towards the enemy front line, followed by the infantry. The barrage then rested on the front line for three minutes, and when it lifted forwards 100 yards (91 m) the first assault wave dropped into the first trench. The Suffolks had some hand-to-hand fight at the junction of 'Malakoff' and 'Sugar' trenches and were slowed by a machine gun until its crew were dealt with. The battalion then pushed on through and round Malakoff farm to the second objective The bombers of 23rd NF had no difficulty linking up with them. The Lincolns found that Sugar and 'Pond' trenches had been almost obliterated by the artillery and heavy trench mortars, and they were able to kill or capture the surviving defenders in the dugouts before moving on to 'Bait Trench'. Similarly 16th RS crossed the smashed Pond Trench and reached Bait trench against minimal opposition except a pocket of Germans on the right who put up a fight before retiring across open ground, many being shot dow as they went. On the other hand 15th RS was faced with a line of dugouts and outposts that had been less damaged by the artillery; the battalion captured them in spite of heavy casualties, but was then forced back to Pond Trench by a counter-attack. While the attack was being made the divisional machine guns had been firing overhead to interdict the routes along which German reinforcements had to come, and Royal Flying Corps aircraft attacked their troops forming up for counter-attacks. Although fighting continued on 15th RS's right flank, the rest of the brigade and the REs were able to consolidate its positions, though suffering numerous casualties from shellfire. During the night of 26/27 August 103rd Bde failed to complete the capture of the high ground of Cologne Ridge in front of 15th RS. Fire directed from this position made the Hargicourt valley dangerous, so 102nd Bde carried out another small formal attack to complete its capture on 9–11 September. 34th Division remained in this sector until the end of the month but there were only patrol actions and raids.

=== Ypres ===
Many of the reinforcements received at the end of September had minimal training, and it was claimed that some of them had never fired their rifles. 34th Division was now transferred north to the Ypres Salient where the offensive continued. After arriving on the night of 8/9 October the battalions of 101st Bde spent three days repairing roads so that the advance could continue. This was done in daylight and bad weather, under constant shell and machine gun fire, and together with night bombardments with gas shells the period cost the brigade significant casualties even though it did not take part in the attack on 12 October (the First Battle of Passchendaele). The troops were now existing in wrecked farms and captured pillboxes linked by duckboard tracks amidst a sea of flooded shellholes. On 19 October 10th Lincolns and 11th Suffolks of 101st Bde relieved 102nd Bde in the front line across the Broembeek valley, and were in turn relieved by 15th and 16th RS on 20 October. The two Royal Scots battalions were to take part in the next attack, but both lost their commanding officers who were gassed while carrying out reconnaissances and had to be evacuated, and both suffered heavily from shellfire on the way up to the line and while lying out in. the shellholes before the attack began. Fifth Army was preparing for a final attempt to gain the high ground (the Second Battle of Passchendaele), and 34th Division's task was a preliminary advance north of Poelcapelle to protect the left flank of the projected main attack. In the 'Action of 22 October 1917' 101st Bde was on the left of the division's line, attacking alongside 35th Division. 16th Royal Scots was on the left, 15th RS on the right, each attacking with two companies in the first wave; a company of 20th NF was to hold the right as the pivot of the attack. The assaulting companies only just got into position in time for Zero at 05.35. The left company of 15th RS got near their objective, a group of pillboxes, but were shot down by the machine gunners in them. The company in support could not cross the flooded Broembeek, and the reserve company was pinned down at its start line by a heavy barrage. 16th Royal Scots had been so badly hit by the earlier shelling that it could only form a single wave which was also held up by pillboxes. To their left, 23rd Manchesters of 35th Division made good progress, following the creeping barrage onto their first objective with few casualties. However, the lack of progress by 16th RS meant that the Manchesters suffered badly from rifle and machine gun fire from this open flank. The fire was so intense that all the officers and many of the non-commissioned officers in the advance were killed or wounded. No further progress was possible for the Manchesters, and a Company Sergeant Major brought the 50 survivors of the attacking companies out of the line. A group of 16th RS and Manchesters was reported to have captured a pillbox at the final objective, but touch with them was lost. With their rifles clogged with mud and unable to fire, the survivors of 16th RS were driven back by a counter-attack, and were brought out of action by a 2nd lieutenant. The Germans shelled the whole of the battle area for the rest of the day. That night the survivors of 15th and 16th RS were relieved by 10th Lincolns and 11th Suffolks, a difficult operation in the darkness and chaos. The division was withdrawn on 24 October.

=== Winter 1917–18 ===
34th Division spent three months in a quieter sector to the south, then went into reserve in February 1918. By the beginning of 1918 the BEF was suffering a manpower crisis. Brigades were reduced from four to three battalions each, and the remainder were broken up to provide reinforcements for the others. In 34th Division the Tyneside Scottish and Tyneside Irish battalions were amalgamated to form a single 102nd Bde and 10th Lincolns transferred to help reform 103rd Bde, leaving 101st Bde with 15th and 16th RS and 11th Suffolks, which had been boosted by drafts from other divisions. The brigade machine gun companies were also taken away to form 34th MG Battalion.

=== Henin Hill ===
34th Division returned to the Arras sector in March 1918. The Germans were soon to launch their Spring offensive, and their plans in the Arras area were quite well known. The offensive began at 04.15 on 21 March with a massive bombardment, mainly on 102nd Bde to the right, but it then expanded leftwards to include 101st Bde's frontage, causing damage and some casualties. A creeping barrage against the brigade at 07.00 was a feint and no infantry assault followed, because the weight of the attack was directed further south against the neighbouring 59th (2nd North Midland) Division at Bullecourt, where the Forward Zone defences were broken. It was not until 15.00 that an intense bombardment was opened on 101st Bde. This stopped at 15.30 when the enemy attacked in waves from the right towards the junction of 101st Bde and 3rd Division to its left. Firing at close range, 11th Suffolks caused heavy casualties to these waves passing their front, as did 16th RS firing from their reserve position in the Croisilles Switch Line. As 102nd Bde on the right fell back, Brig-Gen Gore posted a composite company of infantry who had been on working parties with the REs to cover the Croisilles–St Léger. road. When he was given 10th Lincolns from divisional reserve he posted one company on Henin Hill, the rest to close to gap between Croisilles and St Leger, and they arrived just in time to prevent a German breakthrough on the right. Meanwhile the enemy penetrated between 3rd and 34th Divisions and it was not until 18.00 that 11th Suffolks and 3rd Division threw them out again. With both flanks of 34th Division under threat, it withdraw to the second system of defence on Henin Hill after dark. Despite being attacked in the process 101st Bde's withdrawal was successfully covered by rearguards. Three platoons of 16th RS did not receive the order to pull out, and spent the whole of 22 March holding out in Sensée Trench before falling back the following night to avoid friendly artillery fire.

Between 09.00 and 10.00 next morning, the enemy attacked out of a thick mist and broke through between the right of 101st and left of 102nd Bdes, then swung north and attacked 15th RS in the rear. The battalion fell back along the support line of the Second Position towards Hill Switch, followed by the Germans who then attacked 16th RS supporting 15th RS in Hill Switch. Unfortunately, this trench was incomplete and unsuitable for defence, and a German spotter aircraft called down heavy artillery on. the position, and infantry attacked it from Croissilles. The two Scits battalions had to fall back to the Third Position, where 207th and 209th Field Cos, RE, and two pioneer companies of 18th NF held the line, where the shaken battalions rallied. On the left of the brigade 11th Suffolks, reinforced by about 100 men from 22nd NF from 102nd Bde and with A Company of 34th MG Bn in support, held on to Henin Hill, even though its flank was exposed. The Germans brought field guns up to close range and attacked with aircraft: the troops were slowly pushed back through their trenches. Between 17.00 and 18.00 the hill was heavily bombarded, but it was not until after dark that 11th Suffolks and its supporters withdrew to avoid being encircled. Half went northwards to join 3rd Division, the remainder north-westwards to the Third System defences in front of Boyelles. During the withdrawal the latter party manned a bank and brought down. effective fire on enemy troops trying to advance westwards. The last party of 11th Suffolks with a group of assorted details remained at 'Crucifix Corner' on the hill until 02.30 next morning, covering 3rd Division's withdrawal. The defence of Henin Hill had prevented the Germans from rolling up the line. 34th Division was relieved that night, and went back to bivouacs at Ayette.

=== Battle of the Lys ===
34th Division was moved north to a quieter area to recuperate, occupying a line in the Houplines sector, in front of Armentières under First Army. The exhausted battalions had to absorb inexperienced reinforcements and improve the neglected defences. Unfortunately, this was the sector chosen for the next phase of the German spring offensive (the Battle of the Lys). It began with heavy mustard gas shelling of Armentières on 7–8 April, the gas drifting across the rear areas of the defences, where 101st Bde was in XV Corps reserve. Two companies of 25th NF in 102nd Bde were practically all gassed, and 15th RS had to send up two companies to replace them. The bombardment began at 04.00 on 9 April, and included Erquinghem, where brigade HQ and 16th RS were billeted, and the village soon became almost untenable. 11th Suffolks were bivouacked in front of the town and spread out in 'artillery formation' in the fields in front of the village. Once again, the main weight of the offensive was to the south of 34th Division, where 40th Division's positions were overrun. At 08.05 101st Bde and half a company of 34th BG Bn were ordered to stand-to. At first 11th Suffolks sent two companies as reserve to 103rd Bde holding the long line in front of Armentières, but as news came in from 40th Division the whole of 101st Brigade was sent south at 10.00 to protect the flank. 16th RS and the remaining companies of 15th RS set off, finding Bac St Maur already occupied by the enemy, and so took up a position at Fort Rompu, with two companies across the River Lys. This became the pivot of the defensive flank being formed. 11th Suffolks put three companies into the line on the right of 103rd Bde at 'Streaky Bacon Farm' and one in reserve, facing south towards Fleurbaix, supported by No 4 Section of A Company 34th MG Bn. The line was established at 15.00, though there was a gap to the two Royal Scots battalions further right. However, 12th Suffolks of 121st Bde, 40th Division, falling back after a long defence of Fleurbaix, filled this gap. Next day (10 April) 101st Bde was heavily attacked from both Fleurbaix and Fort Rompu, with the weight falling on the pivot point of the position; the two Royal Scots battalions lost heavily and together with 12th Suffolks were forced back to the Lys where a line was established with the help of 3rd Australian Tunnelling Company and F Special (Gas) Company, RE. 11th Suffolks, operating under the command of 121st Bde, sent its reserve company in a counter-attack near Bois-Grenier at 08.45, which restored the line, but it was gradually forced back to Erquinghem. The centre of the battalion was temporarily broken and the remnant of the MG section was overrun. Battalion HQ dug in and acted as reserve, sending men forward as required. Orders to withdraw arrived at 15.30, but behind the battalion the Armentières salient was being evacuated, and an appeal was made for 11th Suffolks to hold out for two hours longer to allow the troops to get away. Finally, at 17.00 reinforcements from 29th Division arrived, covering the battalion's withdrawal. 101st Brigade crossed the river at Erquinghem and formed up on the far bank.

34th Division was still in a dangerous salient around Nieppe, packed with troops from First and Second Armies, and no rations arrived that night. Soon after 05.30 the Germans attacked 102nd and 103rd Bdes in the apex of the salient, leaving 101st Bde alone. At 16.30 Brig-Gen Gore, as senior brigadier on the spot, was instructed to organise a retirement from the salient towards Steenwerck station. The retirement began at 19.30, with 101st and 103rd Bdes moving along the railway, but it was still daylight and German artillery and machine guns were firing on the railway, so the two brigades had to move across country. By dawn on 12 April 34th Division had six brigades in position between the station and Pont d'Achelles, with 101st Bde in the second line, and with good artillery support they mainly managed to maintain their positions throughout 12 April despite heavy onslaughts. As a gap opened on the right, Brig-Gen Gore sent 11th Suffolks and 16th RS to form a flank guard. In the afternoon several unsuccessful attacks were made against 16th RS and four Vickers guns of 34th MG Bn, which only gave a little ground. By the end of the day the troops under 34th Division's command formed a rough semicircle. Next day at 15.30 a serious attack on 11th Suffolks, 16th RS and their neighbours pushed the line back 200–500 yards (180–460 m), but the line held: it was a breakthrough on the division's left that forced it to resume its withdrawal in the afternoon. Just before the retirement, a shell hit 101st Bde HQ, killing Brig-Gen Gore and the brigade signal officer, and wounding the Brigade major. The HQ of 74th Bde (25th Division) had been sharing the same cellar, and after he was dug out Brig-Gen Craigie Halkett of 74th assumed temporary command of both brigades. Lieutenant-Col A. Stephenson of 16th RS was ordered to take acting command of 101st Bde next day, while his second-in-command took over a composite 15th/16th RS battalion. Meanwhile 11th Suffolks contained remnants of 18th NF (Pioneers) and 15th West Yorkshire Regiment from 31st Division as well as its own men.

The withdrawal was completed by 02.30 on 14 April, to a new defence line behind Bailleul that had been partially prepared by the REs. The brigade spent the day improving its 750 yards (690 m) section of this line from Bailleul station to the western foot of Mont de Lille. At 14.15 the enemy put down an intense barrage on this line and there were attacks on other parts of it. That night 34th Division was relieved by 59th (2nd NM) Division and reached its new rear positions by 05.45 on 15 April, where it began digging and wiring the forward slopes of Mont Noir and Mont Rouge. However, the enemy broke through 59th (2nd SM) Division's lines that afternoon, and 34th's weak brigades stood-to and manned their shallow trenches. Although Bailleul fell, the German attack out of the town on 16 April was crushed by massed artillery and small-arms fire. Further attacks were held off on 17 April, during which 101st Bde was relieved in the line by the men of 13th Tank Battalion manning Lewis guns. 101st Brigade went into reserve and was formed into a single composite battalion, making up a composite brigade with 103rd Bde under Brig-Gen J.G. Chaplin of 103rd. The fighting then died down on 34th Division's front, and the exhausted and depleted division was finally relieved by French troops on 21 April.

== Reorganised 101st Brigade ==
Until mid-May 34 Division was engaged in digging new defence lines in the rear (though the men were twice called on to 'stand to' and prepare to defend these positions during the Second Battle of Kemmel and Battle of the Scherpenberg when German breakthroughs of the French line looked possible). Brigadier-Gen W.J. Woodcock arrived on 23 April to take command of 101st Bde. After the disasters of the German offensive, the BEF did not have sufficient reinforcements to return all its formations to full strength. The decision was made to reduce some divisions to Training Cadres (TC) to train US troops, with the hope that they could be rebuilt later. 34th Division was one of those selected, most its battalions reduced to 10 officers and 45 ORs each, the remainder being posted to other units. In 101st Bde, 11th Suffolks was maintained at full strength and transferred to 61st (2nd South Midland) Division, while 15th and 16th RS were both converted to TCs. The division also took temporary command of a large number of TCs from other divisions that were being reduced. Over the following weeks the division assisted in training the 28th, 78th and 80th US Divisions, each US brigade HQ being affiliated to a British brigade, and each US battalion to a British battalion TC.

Meanwhile reinforcements were being urgently shipped to France from the Palestine campaign, and on 13 June 34th Division was informed that it would be reconstituted using these units. On 30 June three Territorial Force battalions from 53rd (Welsh) Division arrived at Proven to reform 101st Bde:

- 2/4th Bn Queen's Royal Regiment (West Surrey)
- 1/4th Bn Royal Sussex Regiment
- 2nd Bn Loyal North Lancashire Regiment
- 101st TMB

(The TCs of 15th and 16th RS were transferred to 39th Division and continued preparing US and British troops for frontline service until they were disbanded in August.)

=== Soissons ===
As soon as this reorganisation was complete 34th Division was sent to reinforce the French sector of the front. When the Germans launched the last effort of their Spring Offensive on 15 July (the Second Battle of the Marne), the division was diverted and by the evening of 18 July was concentrated round Senlis. The infantry were then moved up by lorry and by 03.00 on 23 July had completed the relief of a French division in the front line. The 34th Division immediately joined in the French counter-attack (the Battle of the Soissonnais and the Ourcq) on 23 July. 101st Brigade was on the right, with 2nd Loyals and 2/4th Queen's in the front line and 1/4th Sussex in brigade reserve in a wood. The Sussex immediately came under German shellfire and began suffering casualties. Two French corps attacked, and 34th Division's role was to link the two. At 07.15 the division was ordered to attack at 07.40. 102nd Brigade on the right received the order and attacked on time, but due to communication problems, 101st Bde was late setting off (08.00) and lost its creeping barrage. The right of 2nd Loyals was stopped in its tracks by machine gun fire, one platoon being practically wiped out, and the CO stopped the movement. The left hand company, with a company of 2/4th Queen's, got across the Coutremain–Tingy road and eliminated some machine gun posts, but were counter-attacked and forced back. The brigade was back on its start-line by 09.30, having suffered heavy casualties, while the French brigade on the left did not advance at all. 102nd Brigade made some progress before being stopped by machine gun fire from three directions. 34th Division was ordered to consolidate this line, and remained there until relieved on 28 July. The division immediately moved during the night of 28/29 July to the Bois de la Baillette to attack Beugneux Ridge. 101st Brigade was on the left. 1/4th Sussex were badly shelled while getting into position to attack alongside 2/4th Queen's, each with two companies in the lead. Starting at 04.10 the battalion pushed forward through a German defensive barrage that included Tear gas, and had progressed over a mile to the Green Line by 06.00, when a halt was made. 2nd Loyals passed through to continue the advance, capturing the crest of Hill 189, but by now the morning fog had lifted and any further movement was stopped. The positions held were scattered and not linked up, and when 102nd Bde was brought up from reserve to attack it coincided with a heavy German counter-attack against the French to the left, and the whole Allied force fell back behind the Green Line; all three brigades of 34th Division were in line to hold this position. The division renewed its attack on 1 August, 2/4th Queen's and 1/4th Sussex once again in the lead, though now weak in numbers and obliged to put in three companies instead of two. Nevertheless, the attack launched in fog and smoke at 04.49 had achieved its objectives (the Brown Line) by 06.00, the 101st Bde using bayonets to overcome opposition in the woods, and 101st TMB doing good work in silencing enemy machine guns. 1/4th Sussex and 2nd Loyals came under enfilade machine gun fire from Hill 203 as they crested the ridge just before the Brown Line, but D Company of the Loyals immediately cleared this hill and formed a defensive flank. At 19.00 the same two battalions made another advance of 300–400 yards (270–370 m) behind a creeping barrage to take a hill that dominated the German line of retreat. The enemy slipped away that night, and French troops passed through 34th Division on 2 August to pursue them. After the battle, the depleted division (averaging fewer that 350 effectives per battalion) entrained to return to the British front.

=== Hundred Days Offensive ===
From 7 to 16 August 34th Division it was refitting and training in order to participate in the final advance of the Hundred Days Offensive that began further south on 8 August. It began takiong over the line in the Ypres sector on 21 August, with 101st Bde taking over the Sherpenberg secrtor on 28 August with 103rd Bde behind it in reserve. The enemy had begun to give ground south of Ypres and patrols from 34th Division were able to seize Kemmel Hill on 31 August without a formal attack. 2/4th Queen's reached its northern slopes by 06.00, and although 2nd Loyals were unable to advance until after the last German rearguards withdrew at 12.00, the rest of 101st Bde was well beyond Kemmel village by then. The advance was resumed at 09.00 next day (1 September) and 2nd Loyals on the brigade's left reached its objective before 11.40, while 2/4th Queen's had a little trouble with some Germans in the Yonge Street dugouts. Orders were issued at 14.30 to begin the second phase at 16.30, but 103rd Bde alongside was still held up. Nevertheless, 1/4th Sussex passed through 2nd Loyals and with 2/4th Queen's made some progress towards the second objective. There were some patrol clashes during the night, then on 2 September 2/4th Queens and the machine guns of101st Bde cooperated as 103rd Bde attacked at 15.00 and caught up to the previous day's second objective. 102nd Brigade took over from 101st and 103rd Bdes on 2/3 September and continued to advance the line until 34th Division was back on the slope of Messines Ridge on 4 September. The division was then relieved and rested for two weeks.

34th Division attacked again on 28 September, the first day of the Fifth Battle of Ypres. The attack consisted of pushing forward strong patrols protected by barrages. In the evening, 101st Bde pushed up the Wytschaete Ridge to within 10 yards of German positions. Next morning it advanced at 05.30, encountering little opposition, swept through Wytschaete, reached Oosttaverne by 08.40, and was at its objective, the Ypres–Comines Canal by 13.00. On 2 October the division crossed the canal and moved on to Zandvoorde unopposed by the disorganised enemy, but this was over open country, with only a single plank road unsuitable for lorries as the only supply route, which came under enemy artillery fire. Successful turning movements by neighbouring divisions meant that 34th Division was now squeezed out of the line.

The division was then in reserve until the Battle of Courtrai on 14 October, when it attacked at 05.35, with 101st Bde in reserve. 101st Brigade came into the line on the night of 15/16 October and the following morning its patrols cleared Wevelgem and pushed forward to the north bank of the River Lys. During the night B Company of 2nd Loyals made a crossing of the river, using an improvised ferry raft to get one man at a time across. It formed a semicircular bridgehead and 208th and 209th Field Cos began building bridges while the rest of 2nd Loyals pushed on to Lauwe. Resistance at Knokke was quickly stifled by 101st TMB. There was no sign of the enemy in front, and progress was easy on 18 and 19 October, until German defences were encountered at Ruddervoorde. From now on, 34th Division operated as brigade groups, each infantry brigade accompanied by a field artillery brigade, an RE company and a company of 34th MG Bn. On 20 October, 30th Division passed through 101st Bde Group, which withdrew to Harelbeke. The brigade groups then alternated in the lead, but 101st was not in the front line during the division's final actions at Ooteghem (25 October) and Tiegham (31 October), although 2/4th Queen's was attached to 103rd Bde Group for the latter operation. An attack by 2nd Loyals planned for 1 November was cancelled.

On 1 November the division was withdrawn into reserve and was refitting and training when hostilities ended with the Armistice on 11 November.

== Postwar ==
On 17 November 1918, 34th Division was chosen to form part of the occupation force in Germany (the British Army of the Rhine), but first it moved to the Lessines area to continue training. 'Pivotal' men needed at home such as miners began to be demobilised. It spent 19 December to 17 January 1919 around Namur and then entrained for the Rhine, completing its takeover of the right sector of the Cologne bridgehead on 29 January. In March 34 Division was reconstituted as Eastern Division and 101st Bde had the following organisation:

- 10th (S) Bn, Lincolnshire Regiment (Grimsby) – reconstituted from cadre
- 1/4th Bn, Royal Sussex Regiment
- 2nd Bn, Loyal North Lancashire Regiment
- 10th (S) Bn, Queen's Own (Royal West Kent Regiment) (Kent County) – from London Division in exchange for 2/4th Bn, Queen's

Eastern Division and its brigades were disbanded in July 1919.

101st Brigade was not reformed during World War II.

== Commanders ==
The following officers commanded 101st Bde:

- Brig-Gen S.B. Jameson, appointed to original 101st Bde 4 December 1914
- Brig-Gen Hugh Gregory Fitton, CB, DSO, appointed to 101st Bde 19 June 1915, wounded 18 January 1916, died 20 January 1916
- Col Charles Wyndham Somerset, acting from 18 January 1916
- Brig-Gen Robert Clements Gore, CB, CMG, from 28 January 1916, killed 13 April 1918
- Lt-Col A. Stephenson, acting from 14 April 1918
- Brig-Gen W.J. Woodcock, DSO, from 23 April 1918 to Armistice

== Memorials ==
There are memorials to 34th Division at La Boiselle and at Mont Noir (Zwarteberg) where it fought during the Battle of the Lys.
