= Robert Clements Gore =

British general

Brigadier-General Robert Clements Gore CB CMG
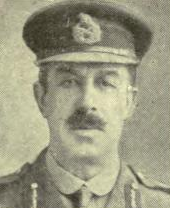
- Born: 3 February 1867
- Died: 13 April 1918 (aged 51) Belgium

Brigadier-General Robert Clements Gore CB CMG (3 February 1867 – 13 April 1918) was a British Army officer who was killed in action during the First World War. He was a member of the Anglo-Irish Gore family.

== Military career ==
Gore was educated at Haileybury and Imperial Service College and commissioned into the Argyll and Sutherland Highlanders from Royal Military College, Sandhurst, in January 1886.

He was promoted to major in November 1907 and to lieutenant colonel in November 1914.

He was assigned to command the 34th Division's 101st Infantry Brigade and was promoted to the temporary rank of brigadier general while employed in this role, taking over from Brigadier General Hugh Gregory Fitton. He was killed in action in Belgium in 1918. His remains were buried at Lijssenthoek Military Cemetery.

== Personal life ==
Gore was born in Clifton, Bristol, to Nathaniel Gore and Louisa Page. He was the grandson of William Gore, MP for Carrick; and great-grandson of William Gore, Bishop of Limerick. His sister Gertrude was married to politician Gilbert McMicking.

In 1899, Gore married Rachel Cecilia Saunderson, daughter of Llewellyn Traherne Bassett Saunderson and Lady Rachel Mary Scott (daughter of John Scott, 3rd Earl of Clonmell). Their only child, Adrian Clements Gore, also achieved the rank of brigadier in the British Army and served with distinction in the Second World War.

== See also ==
- List of generals of the British Empire who died during the First World War
