= Grimsby Chums =

British battalion in the First World War

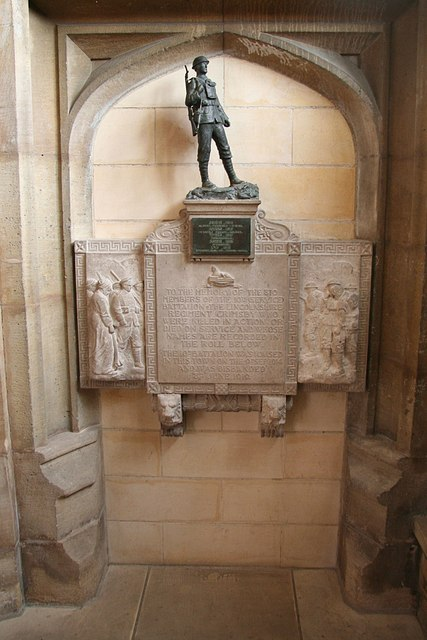
Memorial in St James' Church, Grimsby

The Grimsby Chums was a British First World War Pals battalion of Kitchener's Army raised in and around the town of Grimsby in Lincolnshire in 1914. When the battalion was taken over by the British Army it was officially named the 10th (Service) Battalion, The Lincolnshire Regiment. It was the only 'pals battalion' to be called 'chums'.

When the call came from Lord Kitchener for volunteers, the headmaster of Wintringham Grammar School in Grimsby decided to raise a 250-strong company of former pupils which would be based at the armoury of the school's Officer Training Corps. The company was offered to the local Territorial Force unit, the 5th Battalion, Lincolnshire Regiment, but by then the battalion was full. When other Grimsby men expressed a wish to join, the process was handed over to the town council which set about recruiting sufficient men to form an entire battalion for 'Kitchener's Army'. Men were accepted from neighbouring towns such as Boston, Louth and Scunthorpe. In order to complete the battalion, a group was sent from Wakefield in Yorkshire.

The Grimsby Chums joined the 101st Brigade of the 34th Division where they were joined by the two battalions of the Edinburgh City Pals. The division moved to France in January 1916 and first saw action in the Battle of the Somme. On 1 July 1916, the first day on the Somme, the Grimsby Chums were in the first wave attacking the fortified village of La Boisselle, just south of the Albert–Bapaume road. To aid their attack, a massive mine, known as the Lochnagar mine, was detonated beneath the German trenches at 7.28 am, two minutes before Zero hour. At 7.30 am, the Grimsby Chums rushed forward to occupy the crater. Here many were trapped for the rest of the day, harassed by both German and British artillery.

A few of the Grimsby Chums made it into the German trenches. The only officer to make it was 2nd Lieutenant Harold P. Hendin who led five men to the German reserve trench (the third trench in the front-line system) and, gathering stragglers as the day progressed, he held off a series of German counter-attacks before having to retire. In total the Grimsby Chums suffered 502 casualties on 1 July; 15 officers and 487 other ranks. Only two of the officers came back unwounded, and only about 100 men.

In February 1918 the battalion moved to the 103rd Brigade, 34th Division. The 10th Battalion was disbanded on 3 June 1919.

A memorial in St James' Church, Grimsby, was erected to the memory of the 810 members of the 10th (Service) Battalion who were killed in action or died on service.
