= Hugh Fitton =

Brigadier-General Hugh Fitton CB DSO
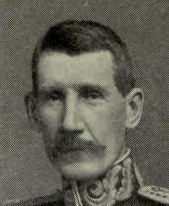
- Born: November 1863
- Died: 20 January 1916 (aged 52) Ypres, Belgium

Brigadier-General Hugh Gregory Fitton CB DSO (November 1863 – 20 January 1916) was a British Army officer. He was killed in Ypres, Belgium, whilst in command of the 34th Division's 101st Infantry Brigade.

== Military career ==
His military career began in February 1884 when he graduated from the Royal Military College, Sandhurst, and was commissioned as a lieutenant in the Royal Berkshire Regiment of the British Army.

He attended the Staff College, Camberley, from 1891 to 1892 and was created a Companion of the Distinguished Service Order in November 1896 and promoted in November 1898 to brevet major, he transferred as a major in May 1902 to the Royal Warwickshire Regiment.

On 30 October he was made a deputy assistant quartermaster general (DAQMG) of the 7th Division, part of the 3rd Army Corps. He was promoted again, on 19 August 1905, to lieutenant colonel, when he took command of a battalion of the Queen's Own Royal West Kent Regiment. On 19 August 1909, after four years in command, he relinquished command of the battalion and was placed on half-pay.

He was awarded the Companion of the Order of the Bath in the 1911 Birthday Honours in June 1911.

In November 1914, having recently been appointed as a brigadier general, he was given command of an infantry brigade.

== Sources ==
- Davies, Frank; Maddocks, Graham (2014) [1995]. Bloody Red Tabs: General Officer Casualties of the Great War 1914–1918. Pen and Sword Books. ISBN 978-1-78346-237-7.
- https://www.malvernremembers.org.uk/ww1-profiles/hugh-gregory-fitton
