= Sir Charles Johnston, 1st Baronet =

Sir Charles Johnston Bt
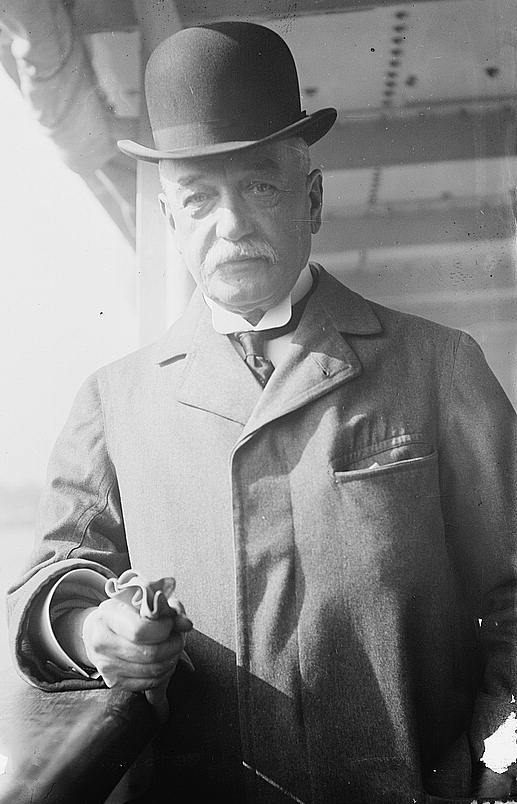
- Sir Charles Johnston in 1914

Lord Mayor of London
- In office 1914–1915
- Preceded by: Sir Vansittart Bowater
- Succeeded by: Charles Wakefield

Sir Charles Johnston, 1st Baronet (3 May 1848 – 10 April 1933), was Lord Mayor of London for 1914 –15.

Prior to serving as Lord Mayor he was an Alderman and, in 1910–11, Sheriff of the City of London. In World War I he was instrumental in forming the 26th (Service) Battalion, Royal Fusiliers (Bankers) from City workers as a 'Pals battalion' of Kitchener's New Army, and served as its Honorary Colonel (1914–15).

He was created a Baronet in January 1916 which became extinct on his death.

Political offices
Preceded by Sir Vansittart Bowater	Lord Mayor of London; 1914–1915	Succeeded by Charles Wakefield
Baronetage of the United Kingdom
New creation	Baronet (of London); 1916–1933	Extinct
