= Charles Graham Robertson =

English Victoria Cross recipient (1879-1954)

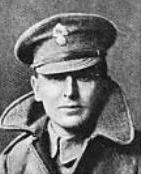
- Born: 4 July 1879; Penrith, Cumberland, England
- Died: 10 May 1954 (aged 74); Dorking, Surrey, England
- Burial place: Dorking Cemetery
- Military career
- Allegiance: United Kingdom
- Branch: British Army
- Rank: Sergeant
- Units: Imperial Yeomanry; Royal Fusiliers
- Conflicts: Second Boer War; World War I World War II
- Awards: Victoria Cross; Military Medal

Sergeant Charles Graham Robertson VC MM (4 July 1879 – 10 May 1954) was an English recipient of the Victoria Cross, the highest and most prestigious award for gallantry in the face of the enemy that can be awarded to British and Commonwealth forces.

Robertson first served with the Imperial Yeomanry during the Second Boer War. Robertson was 38 years old, and a lance-corporal in the 10th (Service) Battalion, Royal Fusiliers (Stockbrokers), British Army during the First World War when the following deed took place for which he was awarded the VC.

For most conspicuous gallantry and devotion to duty in repelling a strong attack by the enemy on our position. On realising that he was being cut off, L./Cpl. Robertson sent back two men to get reinforcements, and remained at his post (with only one other man), firing his Lewis gun and killing large numbers of the enemy, who were in range on his right. No reinforcements came up, and, realising that he was being completely cut off, he withdrew with the only other survivor of the garrison of the post, to a point about ten yards further back where he successfully held his position.

Here he again stayed for some considerable time, firing his Lewis gun and inflicting casualties on the enemy. The position was, however, made impossible for him by the heavy hostile bombing and machine-gun fire, so he was forced to again withdraw and arrived at a defended post. At this post he got on top of the parapet with a comrade, mounted his gun in a shell-hole, and continued firing at the enemy, who were pouring across the top of and down an adjacent trench. He had not been firing long when his comrade was killed, and he himself severely wounded. He managed to crawl back, bringing his gun with him, but could no longer fire it, as he had exhausted all his ammunition.

L./Cpl. Robertson was alone throughout these operations, except for the presence of one other man who later was killed, and the most determined resistance and fine fight which he put up undoubtedly prevented the enemy from making a more rapid advance. His initiative and resource, and the magnificent fighting spirit, are worthy of the highest praise.

He served in World War II in the Home Guard.

== The Medal ==
His VC is displayed at the Royal Fusiliers Museum in the Tower of London, England. This and his other medals were presented to the museum by his widow in 1977.

== Bibliography ==
- Buzzell, Nora, ed. (1997). The Register of the Victoria Cross. Cheltenham, Gloucestershire: This England Alma House. ISBN 0-906324-27-0.
- Gliddon, Gerald (2013) [2004]. Spring Offensive 1918. VCs of the First World War. Stroud, Gloucestershire: The History Press. ISBN 978-0-7524-8730-4.
