= Charles Wakefield, 1st Viscount Wakefield =

English businessman

The Viscount Wakefield
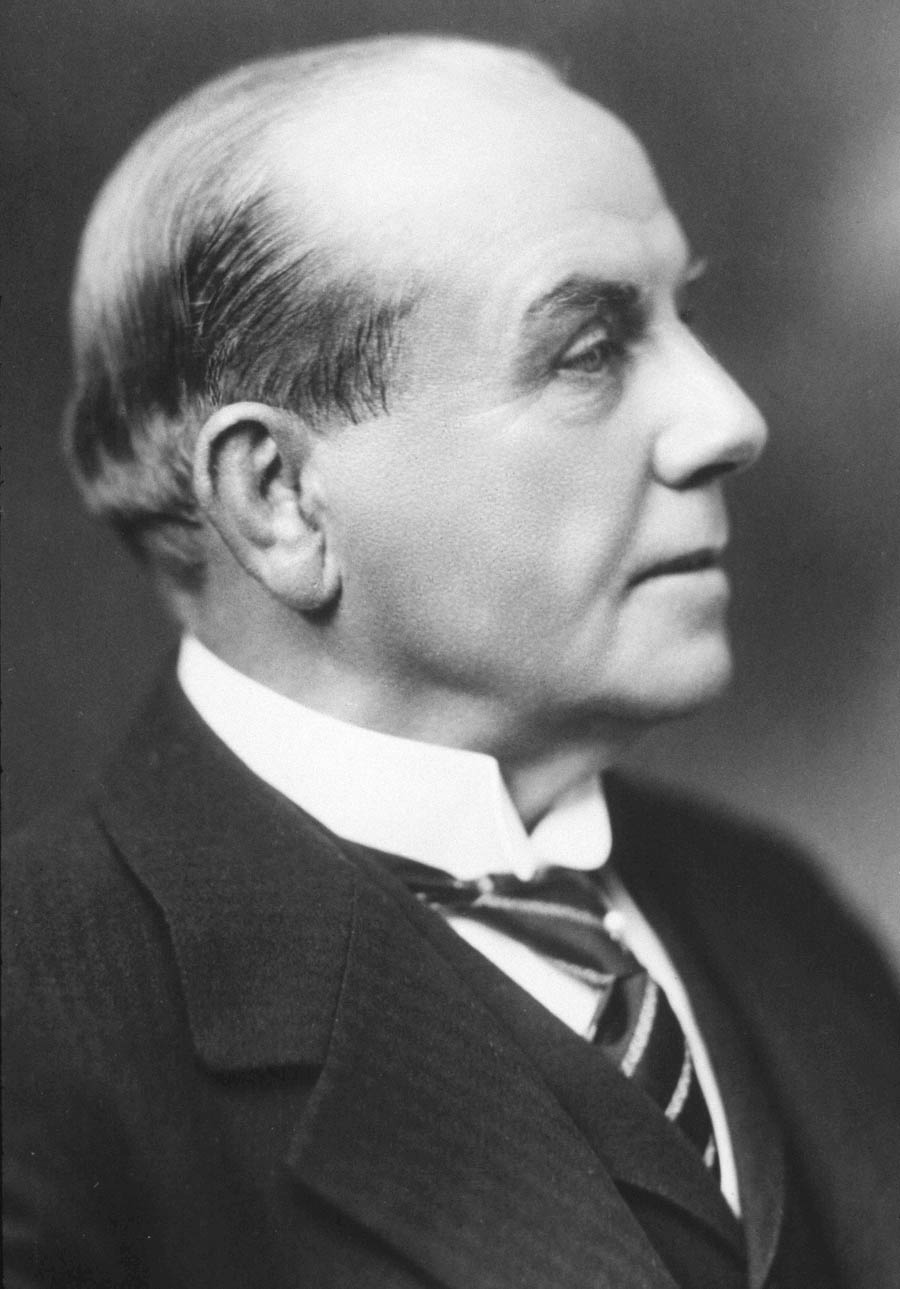
- Born: Charles Wakefield; 12 December 1859; Liverpool, England
- Died: 15 January 1941 (aged 81); Beaconsfield, England
- Occupation: Businessman
- Known for: Founder of Castrol
- Spouse: Sarah Frances Graham (married 1887)

The Right Honourable Lord Charles Cheers Wakefield, 1st Viscount Wakefield, (12 December 1859 – 15 January 1941), was an English businessman who founded the Castrol lubricants company, was lord mayor of London and was a significant philanthropist.

== Early life and family ==
Wakefield was born in Liverpool, the son of John Wakefield, and his wife Margaret, née Cheers, and was educated at the Liverpool Institute.

He married Sarah Frances Graham in January 1887.

== Business career ==
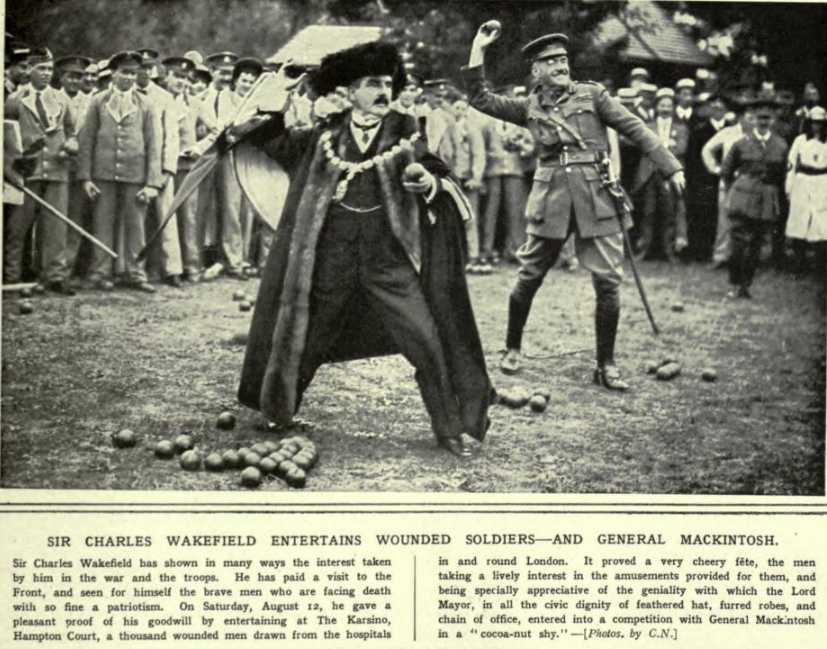
Sir Charles Wakefield as Lord Mayor of London in 1916 (Illustrated War News)

Wakefield patented the Wakefield lubricator for steam engines in the 1890s. In 1899 he founded the Wakefield Oil Company, but subsequently changed its name to Castrol. The name Castrol was chosen because of the castor oil that was added to the company's lubricating oils. This title has since become a household name in the United Kingdom. The Castrol brand lubricants produced by Wakefield's company were used in the engines of motor cars, aeroplanes, and motorcycles.

A Castrol endorsement contract and the generous patronage of Wakefield provided the funds for Jean Batten to purchase the Percival Gull Six G-ADPR monoplane in which she set two world records for solo flight.

== City of London ==
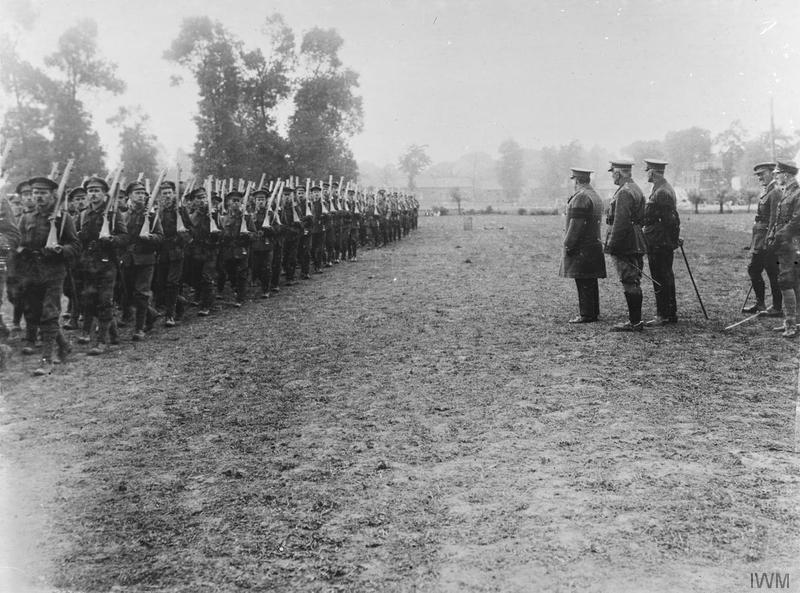
15th Battalion, London Regiment (Civil Service Rifles), 47th (2nd London) Division, marching past the Lord Mayor of London, Colonel Sir Charles Wakefield, 11 June 1916. (IWM Q633)

Wakefield was an Alderman, a member of the Court of Common Council, Sheriff (1907), and for 1915–1916 Lord Mayor. He received a Knighthood in 1908, for services to the City of London. He was involved with a huge number of City institutions and charities, and was a co-founder of the Wakefield Trust, along with his friend the Rev'd "Tubby" Clayton, better known as the founder of the Toc H charity.

In World War I he was instrumental in forming the 26th (Service) Battalion, Royal Fusiliers (Bankers) from City workers as a 'Pals battalion' of Kitchener's New Army, and served as its Honorary Colonel (1915–16).

On 16 February 1917 he was created a Baronet of Saltwood in the County of Kent. He was raised to the peerage as Baron Wakefield, of Hythe in the County of Kent on 21 January 1930, and on 28 June 1934 he was further honoured when he was created Viscount Wakefield, of Hythe in the County of Kent.

== Hythe (Kent) ==
In his day, Wakefield was one of the most prominent and well-known characters in the town of Hythe, Kent, and the official Year Book of Hythe Town Council, in its list of Freemen of the Borough describes him as "Hythe's greatest benefactor". He was created a Freeman of the Borough on 30 May 1930, under the provisions of the Honorary Freedom of Boroughs Act 1885. His name appears on many memorial inscriptions in Hythe today, and also lives on as the name of one of the town's masonic lodges. Viscount Wakefield is buried at Spring Lane Cemetery, Seabrook, within the Borough of Hythe, from which he took his title.

== Additional notes ==
It is often erroneously reported that Wakefield was commonly known by the nickname, or colloquial name, of "Cheers". Although he did prefer this name, it was in fact a given (baptismal) name, his middle name, having been the maiden name of his mother. Wakefield and his wife had a daughter, Freda Ware (née Wakefield). Freda accompanied her parents on many of their public engagements including Wakefield's business trip to America as part of the Sulgrave Institution. Wakefield left Freda, her husband Ivor and her four children a living each for their futures.

== Sussex Motor Yacht Club ==
Wakefield was a member of Sussex Motor Yacht Club and in 1931 donated The Warwick Vase, "The International Championship of London, Challenge Trophy" to the club.

== Czech Society of Great Britain ==
Wakefield was chairman of the Czech Society of Great Britain. He was awarded Order of the White Lion in 1923.

== Howard 'Grace' Cup ==
In 1931 Lord Wakefield purchased a grace cup from the Howard family and donated it to the Victoria and Albert museum. The ivory bowl within the setting of the cup is said to have belonged to Thomas Becket, Archbishop of Canterbury who was murdered in Canterbury cathedral in 1170.

Honorary titles
Preceded by Sir Charles Johnston, 1st Baronet	Lord Mayor of London; 1915–1916	Succeeded by Sir William Dunn, 1st Baronet, of Clitheroe
Peerage of the United Kingdom
New creation	Viscount Wakefield; 1934–1941	Extinct
New creation	Baron Wakefield; 1930–1941	Extinct
Baronetage of the United Kingdom
New creation	Baronet (of Saltwood); 1917–1941	Extinct
