= 10th (Service) Battalion, Royal Fusiliers (Stockbrokers) =

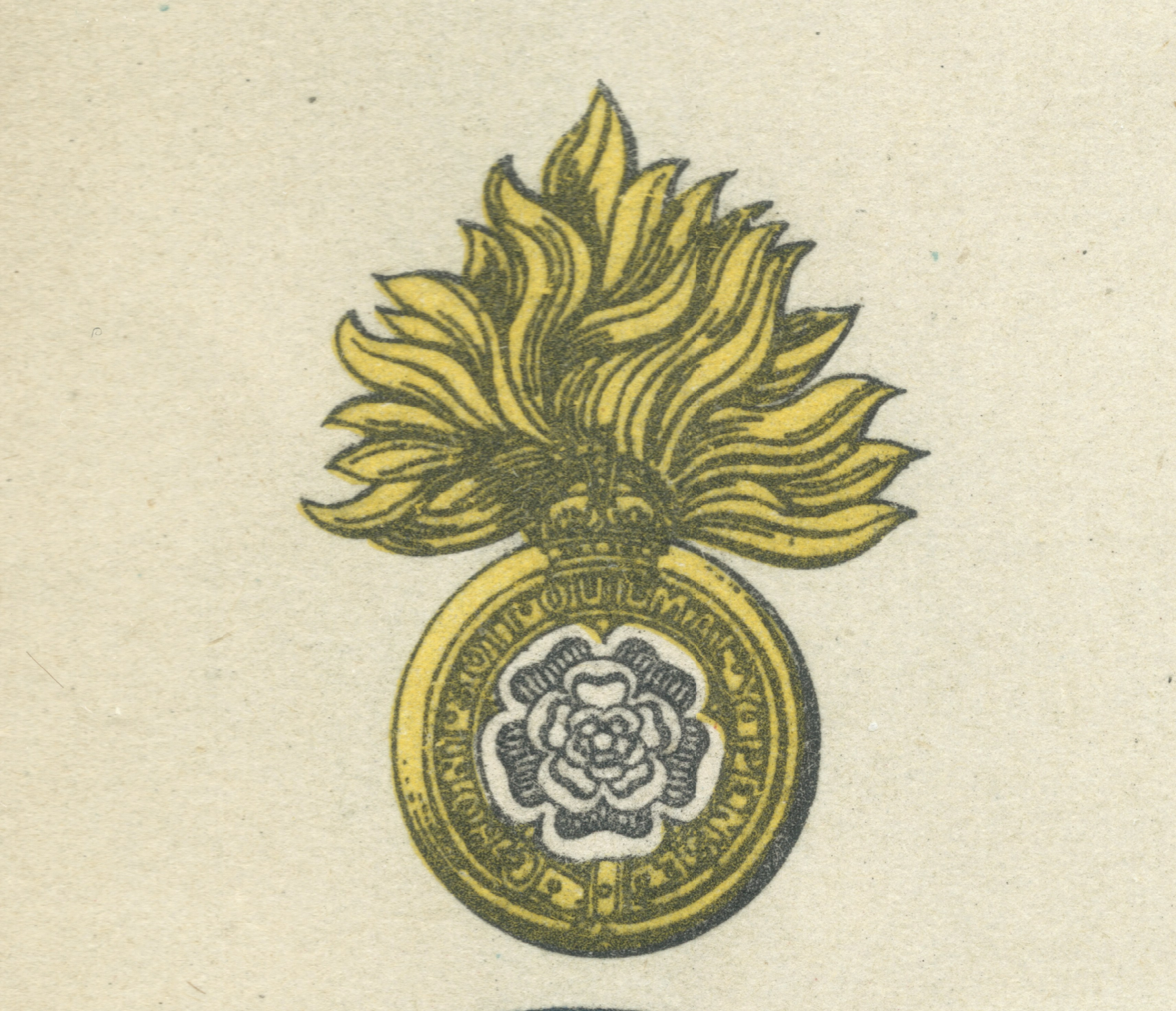
- Cap badge of the Royal Fusiliers
- Active: 21 August 1914–31 March 1919
- Allegiance: United Kingdom
- Branch: New Army
- Type: Pals battalion
- Role: Infantry
- Size: One Battalion
- Part of: 37th Division
- Garrison/HQ: City of London
- Nickname: 'Ditchers'
- Patron: Lord Mayor and Corporation of London
- Anniversaries: 29 August
- Engagements: Battle of the Somme; Battle of the Ancre; Battle of Arras; Third Battle of Ypres; German spring offensive Hundred Days Offensive

Commanders
- Colonel of the Regiment: Sir Vansittart Bowater
- Notable commanders: Hon Robert White

The 10th (Service) Battalion, Royal Fusiliers (Stockbrokers) (10th RF) was an infantry unit of 'Kitchener's Army' in World War I. Recruited from the financial community of the City of London it was the original 'Pals battalion'. It served on the Western Front from July 1915 until the Armistice, seeing action at the Somme and the Ancre, at Arras and Ypres, against the German spring offensive, and in the final Hundred Days Offensive.

== Recruitment ==
Alfred Leete's recruitment poster for Kitchener's Army.

On 6 August 1914, less than 48 hours after Britain's declaration of war, Parliament sanctioned an increase of 500,000 men for the Regular British Army. The newly appointed Secretary of State for War, Earl Kitchener of Khartoum, issued his famous call to arms: 'Your King and Country Need You', urging the first 100,000 volunteers to come forward. Men flooded into the recruiting offices and the 'first hundred thousand' were enlisted within days. This group of six divisions with supporting arms became known as Kitchener's First New Army, or 'K1'.

Meanwhile, on 19 August the Director of Recruiting at the War Office (WO), Major-General Sir Henry Rawlinson, wrote to his friend Major the Hon Robert 'Bobby' White, who worked at the stockbrokers Govett & Sons in the City of London. (Note: White had seen service in the First Boer War, the Nile Expedition, and in Rhodesia. He had been convicted for his involvement in the Jameson Raid of 1895–96, but had later been reinstated in the army and served in the Second Boer War.) He told White that Kitchener was anxious to get additional recruits for the Royal Fusiliers (City of London Regiment). He suggested that they could recruit from men working for the financial businesses in the city: 'many City employés ... would be willing to enlist if they were assured that they would serve with their friends'. White set up a recruiting office at Govett's premises in Throgmorton Street and enlisted over 1600 men in under a week. Parading before Field Marshal Earl Roberts at Temple Gardens on 29 August in all sorts of clothing, from silk hats and morning coats to caps and Norfolk jackets, they marched to the Tower of London to be sworn in by the Lord Mayor of London, Sir Vansittart Bowater, who later became the battalion's Honorary Colonel. (Note: The ceremony took place in the Tower Ditch, leading to the battalion's nickname of the 'Ditchers'. It later celebrated 29 August as its anniversary.) Impressed by the response to the battalion, the Earl of Derby coined the phrase 'a battalion of pals', and began recruiting similar groups in Liverpool. Soon Pals battalions were springing up all over the country. The Royal Fusiliers sponsored several of these – the Empire Battalion, the Public Schools Battalions, the Sportsmen, the Frontiersmen etc., but the 'Stockbrokers' was the first, handed over to the WO as part of 'Kitchener's Second New Army' (K2) on 6 September 1914.

== Training ==
On 3 September the men paraded at the Tower and entrained for Colchester in Essex, where they were accommodated at Sobraon Barracks. Lieutenant-Colonel Claude Hawker, formerly of the Coldstream Guards and just returned from service with the Anatolian Gendarmerie in the Turkish Empire, was appointed commanding officer (CO) with White as second-in-command. White had been able to obtain 25 ex-non-commissioned officers (NCOs) from the Brigade of Guards to assist with the training, which proceeded rapidly, although there were not enough rifles to equip the whole battalion. Hawker left in December and White was promoted to lieutenant-colonel on 6 December to command the battalion. As a 'spare' Kitchener battalion outside the main army organisation, the 10th Royal Fusiliers was designated as 'Army Troops', ie not assigned to a specific formation. White lobbied to get the battalion attached to the First New Army (K1), which would be going overseas first. However, it was attached to the 18th (Eastern) Division which was gathering round Colchester as part of K2. 10th Royal Fusiliers remained attached to this division until 25 February 1915, when it moved to Andover, Hampshire, to join 44th (later 37th) Division. (The battalion's depot companies seem to have remained at Colchester.)

As authorised in March 1915, 37th Division consisted of Kitchener battalions that had originally been allocated as Army Troops to the New Armies. 10th Royal Fusiliers was allotted to 111th Brigade in the new division; the brigade also included 13th RF, 13th King's Royal Rifle Corps (KRRC), and 13th Rifle Brigade (RB). By April 1915 when the division was formed, all its units had been training for some months, and it was quickly assembled on Salisbury Plain for final battle training. 10th Royal Fusiliers was stationed at Windmill Hill near Ludgershall from 7 April to 30 July. In July orders arrived for the division to move to France to join the British Expeditionary Force (BEF) on the Western Front. Embarkation began on 28 July, the 10th RF advance party arrived in France on 30 July and most of the remainder of the battalion next day. On 2 August the division completed its concentration around Tilques, near Saint-Omer.

=== 10th Battalion, Intelligence (B) ===
Before World War I the Directorate of Military Intelligence at the War Office had identified a number of officers and civilians whose skills could be used in the event of war, and this scratch Intelligence Corps went to France with the BEF in August 1914. These officers’ batmen, and later the policemen recruited for field security duties, were enlisted into the Royal Fusiliers under the cover designation of ‘10th Battalion, Intelligence B’ – not to be confused with the 10th (Stockbrokers’) Battalion, though the varied personnel of the 'Stockbrokers' did provide it with at least one intelligence officer. As the war progressed, more and more men were recruited for their language skills, ranging from idle rich travellers to a showman who trained Russian bears and an Anglo-Armenian sergeant born in France and educated in Czechoslovakia. The 10th RF I(B) specialised in plainclothes security and counter-espionage work and operated in France, Italy, Salonika, the Middle East and Russia.

=== 31st (Reserve) Battalion ===
On 17 July 1915 the Lord Mayor and City of London raised a second Pals battalion of the Royal Fusiliers from the financial community: the 26th (Service) Battalion (Bankers) was recruited from bank clerks and accountants across the country. It went on to fight in 41st Division on the Western Front and in Italy. On 21 October 1915 the depot companies of the 10th (Stockbrokers) and 26th (Bankers) battalions were combined at Colchester to form the 31st (Reserve) Battalion, Royal Fusiliers, as a Local Reserve unit with the role of training reinforcement drafts for the two parent battalions. 31st (R) Battalion moved to Leamington Spa in Warwickshire and joined the 24th Reserve Brigade (an all-Royal Fusiliers brigade). By January 1916 it was at Abingdon in Oxfordshire, and in April 1916 the brigade moved to Edinburgh. On 1 September 1916 the Local Reserve battalions were transferred to the Training Reserve (TR) and 31st (R) Bn RF became 107th Training Reserve Battalion, though the training staff retained their Royal Fusiliers badges. On 6 September 1917 it was redesignated 265th (Infantry) Battalion, TR, and on 1 November 1917 it reverted to the regiment as 52nd (Graduated) Bn, RF. It was then at Ipswich in Suffolk as part of 217th Brigade of 72nd Division. 72nd Division was broken up in early 1918, and in February 1918 the battalion transferred to 204th Bde of 68th Division at Newmarket, where it remained for the rest of the war. On 8 February 1919 it was converted into a service battalion and joined the British Army of the Rhine, where it was absorbed into 23rd (Service) Bn, RF (1st Sportsmen's) on 4 April.

== Service ==
On arrival the units of 37th Division were attached to those of 12th (Eastern) Division in the front line for instruction in trench warfare in the quiet sector near Armentières; on 18 August 10th RF was attached to 8th RF. At the end of August 37 Division entrained for Doullens and then marched to Foncquevillers in the Somme sector, where the BEF was taking over more of the line from French troops. The battalions took turns in the front line, and there was a steady trickle of casualties. From 23 to 27 September during the Battle of Loos the division was stationed at La Cauchie to act as reserve for the French Tenth Army's attack, but then returned to Foncquevillers and the routine of trench holding alternating with billets in Souastre through the autumn and winter. On 10 December the men of 10th RF amused themselves by setting up a large noticeboard near the German trenches with a report of a peace demonstration in Berlin.

On 2 January 1916 the second-in-command of the 10th RF was promoted to command another battalion, and was replaced by Major Winston Churchill, who had resigned from the government after the Dardanelles affair and had been serving with the Grenadier Guards. However, Churchill had only been with the 10th RF three days when he was promoted to lieutenant-colonel to command a battalion of the Royal Scots Fusiliers. On the moonless night of 13/14 January 10th RF made use of a gap in the German barbed wire to carry out a large raid, but the raiders were spotted and fired upon at close range, suffering casualties as they withdrew. On 6 February the battalion moved a few miles north to a new sector at Bailleulval, then on 18 March carried out a two-day march to a training area at Mezerolles. By now the 10th RF, 1100 strong when it landed in France, was down to about 850 men, the casualties so far including 18 killed or died of wounds.

After a four-week period of rest and training the battalion left Mezerolles on 21 April when it moved to Humbercamps in the rear area of the Somme sector, providing working parties for the Royal Engineers (REs) before going back into the line on 30 April. On the morning of 4 May the battalion came under heavy artillery fire, losing 9 men killed or died of wounds and 48 wounded. In May 1916 10th RF received a reinforcement draft of 54 men from 18th (S) Bn RF (1st Public Schools), which had been disbanded after most of its other ranks (ORs) had been commissioned as officers. Another 21 men arrived from 31st (R) Bn RF at Colchester. However, the battalion continued to suffer a steady toll of casualties when holding the trenches. On 5 June it carried out a short raid, which had been carefully rehearsed and was covered by an artillery barrage; casualties were trifling.

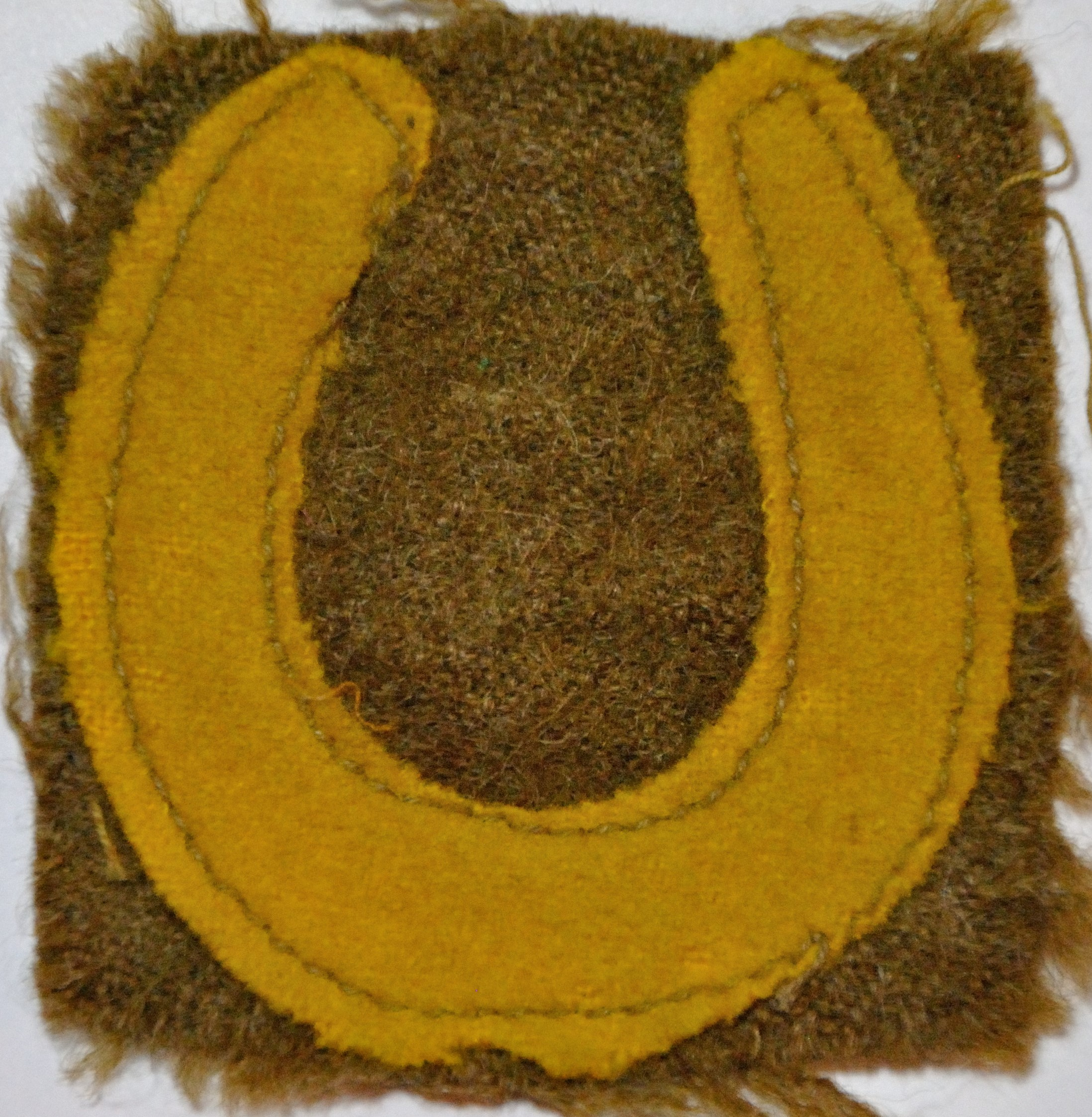
37th Division's 'gold horseshoe' insignia.

=== Somme ===
10th Royal Fusiliers had been in France almost a year and had still not participated in any major action, but the BEF was now preparing for that summer's 'Big Push' (the Battle of the Somme). The artillery bombardment began on 23 June and 10th RF supplied working parties to carry forward gas cylinders for release when the assault was launched on 1 July. Initially, 37th Division was not involved. Then 111th Brigade was attached to 34th Division from 7 July as a temporary replacement for a brigade that had been shattered on the First day on the Somme. The fresh troops were immediately rushed to the front to assist with carrying and working parties. On 9 July 10 RF suffered a few casualties when a large dump of grenades was blown up by enemy shellfire. On 10 July 111th Bde HQ, 10th RF and 13th KRRC took over the left sector of 34th Division's front due east of La Boisselle. The trenches were exposed and badly battered by shellfire. That night C and D Companies of 10th RF relieved 13th RB, which had suffered serious casualties in an attack towards Pozières. Next day patrols advanced the line by 200 yards (180 m). The Battle of Bazentin Ridge was launched before dawn on 14 July: 112th Bde attacked Pozières at 08.30 the following morning (15 July), supported by 111th Bde. 10th RF advanced up 'Sausage Valley' in support at 09.00, intending to pass through and continue the attack, but the leading waves of 112th Bde had been held up 400 yards (370 m) short of Pozières by machine gun fire and the valley was full of bunched up battalions, which began to fall back to the cover of a sunken road. 10th RF pushed on, C and B Companies each on a two-platoon front followed by D and A. With this new impetus the attack reached a small orchard on the Albert–Pozières road 200 yards (180 m) from the village. Fighting went on round the village all day but despite a new artillery bombardment from 17.00 to 18.00 10th RF's second attack was disjointed when the damp signal rockets failed to fire. No further progress was possible and the attacking brigades fell back to the remaining trenches. 10th RF had lost 42 killed, 183 wounded and 21 missing; the casualties included all four company commanders. The battalion was immediately relieved, reaching the shelter of deep dugouts in the rear by 02.00 next morning.

Some reinforcements arrived from 31st RF in England and the battalion underwent some training. On 31 July it went up in support of 101st Bde in the front line. It spent some days improving the support trenches, then on 3 August it moved up to hold the front line while 16th Royal Scots (101st Bde) attacked as part of the Battle of Pozières Ridge. The attack was a failure, so 10th RF resumed its work in the support line under spasmodic shellfire. On 6 August it relieved 13th KRRC in High Wood, working on the trenches there, and patrolling forward to locate the German trenches hidden in the tangled woodland. The battalion was relieved and moved back to 'Bottom Wood' among the heavy gun batteries, where a new draft of reinforcements arrived. 10th RF left the Somme on 18 August, travelling by train to billets in Estaires, then on 22 August to Camblain-Châtelain, where it rejoined 37th Division. It moved into huts near Bully-les-Mines on 30 August.

On 5 September 10th RF was attached to 190th Bde of 63rd (Royal Naval) Division, holding the line in the Calonne-sur-la-Lys sector. Next day A and C Companies went up to the line at Fosse 10 and were replaced in 10th RF by two companies from 10th Royal Dublin Fusiliers. This composite battalion then relieved 13th RF in the trenches on 7 September. No man's land here was narrow, and raids and shelling were common. On 11 September the companies of 10th RF were relieved and concentrated again at billets in Verdrel. Next day Lt-Col White left the battalion on promotion to command a brigade. He was succeeded by Maj Rice of the Scottish Horse, who had previously been attached to 13th RF. On 17 September 10th RF returned to Bully-Grenay and 111th Bde, which took over the sector from 190th Bde. The battalion then took turns in the front line, and absorbed another draft of 115 reinforcements.

=== Ancre ===
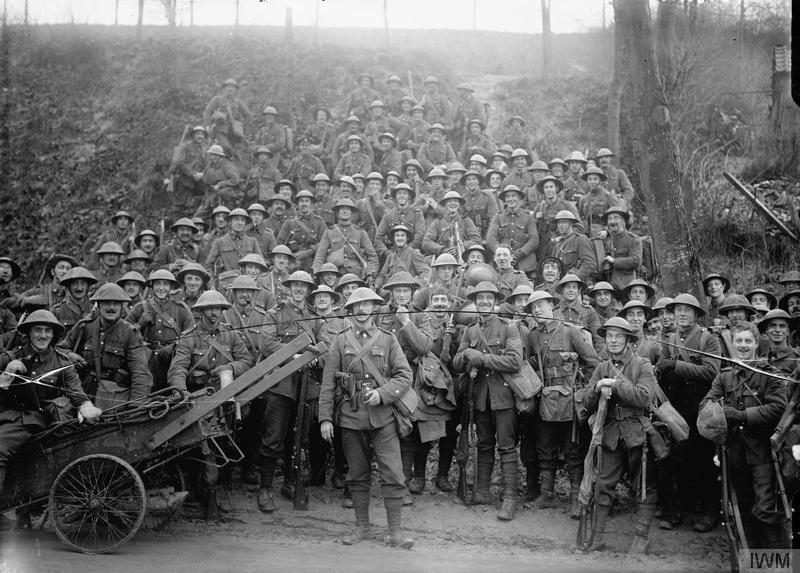
Troops of 10th Royal Fusiliers resting near St Pol on the march up to the trenches in November 1916.

On 17 October 37th Division marched back to the Somme, arriving at Puchevillers behind Albert on 22 October. Training here and at Hem-Hardinval was restricted by bad weather and the need to clear muddy roads. On 13 November 111th Bde moved up to the line and came under the command of 63rd (RN) Division for the Battle of the Ancre. Next day 10th RF advanced with the support of a tank to mop up a German redoubt that 63rd (RN) Division had bypassed the day before. It captured 270 Germans and released 60 British prisoners without a shot being fired, the tank terrifying the defenders. The battalion then spent the day collecting wounded from the previous day's battlefield while the rest of 111th Bde pushed on to Beaucourt and towards the objective of 'Muck Trench' (so named from its muddy condition). 37th Division took over command of the sector on 15 November, and that night 10th RF was sent up to relieve 13th KRRC, discovering and capturing a party of Germans still in the trenches when they arrived. At dawn the battalion attacked a group of trenches known as the 'Triangle', but was driven back by rifle fire; a bombing party reached the Triangle in the afternoon but was also driven back. The battalion was next ordered to occupy Muck Trench and establish a chain of four strongpoints along 600 yards (550 m) of its length. Although the trench was reached it was under shellfire and the strongpoints could not be established in daylight; eventually the two left posts were set up after dark. At 06.10 on 18 November the battalion made another attempt on the Triangle in cooperation with an attack by the neighbouring 32nd Division. Although most of the battalion's attackers reached their objectives, 32nd Division's attack failed and 10th RF had to withdraw from its gains. Strong patrols during the night also failed to enter the Triangle due to lack of promised artillery support. 10th RF made one last attack on 19 November, after a three-hour bombardment of the objective, but nothing was gained. 10th RF was finally relieved from Muck Trench that night and returned to Puchevillers.

After two weeks' training at Puchevillers, where it absorbed 156 poorly trained reinforcements, 10th RF marched northwards on 13 December, arriving in the trenches of the Neuve-Chapelle sector on 21 December. Here it began a routine of alternating trench duty with other battalions of 111th Bde, the recent reinforcements being trained at nearby Calonne-sur-la-Lys. The battalion also received a draft from 11th (Reserve) Battalion, East Surrey Regiment. In early February the brigade shifted to the Hulluch sector, where C Company carried out a raid on 1 March. On 4 March the battalion was relieved and marched to the divisional training area at Roëllecourt, west of Arras, where it trained in snowy weather for the forthcoming Battle of Arras.

=== Arras ===
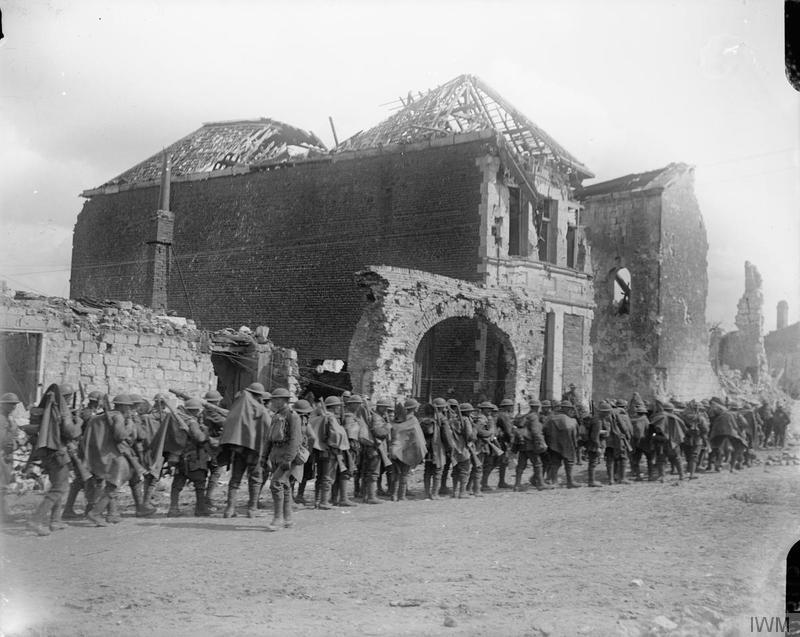
10th Royal Fusiliers marching through Arras on the way up to attack on 9 April 1917.

10th RF's (and Third Army's) objective for this attack was the village of Monchy-le-Preux on the high ground above the River Scarpe, and the operation was carefully rehearsed. The attack was to begin on 9 April after four days of bombardment, with the assaulting formations taking a succession of objectives, the Black, Blue and Brown lines. The fresh 37th Division waiting in the Arras suburbs would then pass through to capture the final (Green Line) objective, just beyond Monchy, but it was unclear whether this could be tackled on the first day. The assault went in at 05.30 and at 12.00 111th and 112th Bdes were ordered up to the Black Line. Then at 15.00 111th Bde followed 12th (Eastern) and 15th (Scottish) Divisions up Battery Valley, believing the Wancourt–Feuchy trenches (the Brown Line) to have already been captured. However, the brigade came under heavy machine gun fire from these trenches. It was not until 18.37 that 15th (S) Division reported the Brown Line secured, and 111th Bde attacked as darkness approached. By now the enemy had recovered from the initial shock of the assault, and the British field artillery was still moving up. 111th Brigade was held up by uncut wire and its supporting tank broke down; the opportunity to seize Monchy on the first day was lost. During the night the troops of 111th and 112th Bdes were disentangled from those of 12th (E) Division, and were ordered to carry out their attack next morning once the rest of the Wancourt–Feuchy trenches had been captured. 37th Division's other brigade (63rd) was already through the gap and holding Orange Hill, so it led the attack. 111th Brigade followed and launched its assault about 12.00 in a snowstorm from the northern slope of Orange Hill, making ground rapidly despite the lack of field artillery support (although the heavy guns were bombarding Monchy). However, the machine gun fire from the village and from the north side of the river brought 10th and 13th RF to a halt about 500 yards (460 m) short of Monchy. An erroneous report that they were in Monchy led to the British cavalry being brought up to exploit a breakthrough, but they achieved nothing. The brigade tried again on 11 April, this time with four tanks in support. Progress was slow, but 13th KRRC and 13th RB finally made their way to Monchy, followed by 10th RF, who stormed into the village itself about 11.00. The official historian described the capture of Monchy-le-Preux as 'one of the outstanding feats of the whole battle'. Although the remnant of 111th Bde was now weak, with very few officers, it was assisted in consolidating the village by 63rd Bde and the cavalry. 10th RF was withdrawn at 23.00 that night, having lost 12 officers and 240 ORs killed, wounded or missing. Among the wounded was Lt-Col Rice and Maj R.A. Smith took command on 10 April.

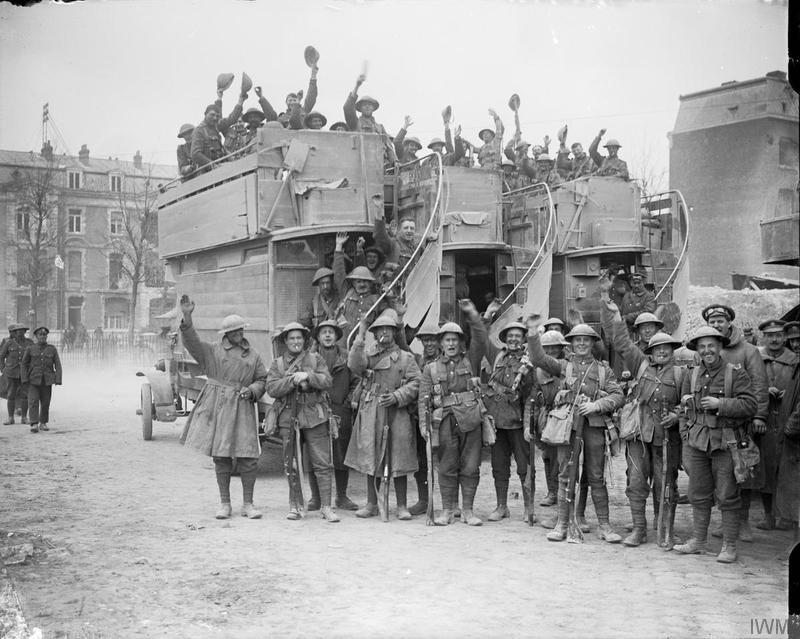
Men of 37th Division boarding London buses after coming out of the line after the capture of Monchy-le-Preux.

10th RF returned to the front on 19 April in time for the Second Battle of the Scarpe, opening on 22 April. The battalion held a front of about 250 yards (230 m) on the right of the brigade, and attacked next day. At Zero (04.45) the battalion advanced with each company in four waves, closely following the Creeping barrage. The advance went to plan until the German second line trench was reached. 63rd Brigade on the right had edged too far left, and the battalion on 10th RF's left was slow coming forward, so the battalion was open to machine gun fire from the flanks. Once the confusion was sorted out, a patrol from 10th RF went forward and reported that the second objective, Cuba Trench, was unoccupied. 10th RF, reduced to three officers and about 50 ORs in fighting condition, occupied the trench by 09.30, and was followed by 13th RF and 13th KRRC. Patrols made contact with the Germans along a road about 0.5 miles (0.8 km) ahead. After this success, the Germans bombarded Cuba Trench heavily, but 111th Bde consolidated it over the following days. On the morning of 28 April 10th RF extended along Cuba Trench to allow 13th RF and 13th KRRC to carry out the next assault on the road in front, the only part of the Battle of Arleux or Gavrelle that went to plan. During the night a working party from 10th RF helped the REs to strengthen the position by constructing a second trench and strongpoint in front of Cuba Trench. The battalion was relieved on the night of 29 April, having lost 4 officers killed and 6 wounded, 42 ORs killed, 192 wounded and 22 missing during the week of fighting in front of Gavrelle.

Until the middle of June 10th RF was at rest, training, or providing working parties for the REs. It absorbed over 300 new drafts, amounting to almost half the strength of the battalion and many proving to be unfit. Major Smith was promoted to take permanent command of the battalion.

=== Ypres ===
On 23 June the battalion began a march north to the Ypres Salient, where 37th Division was to join Second Army for the forthcoming Third Battle of Ypres. 10th RF went into the line south of Wyteschaete on 28 June, suffering a few casualties over following days from shellfire and patrolling. It was behind the lines training for the attack from 16 to 25 July, then re-entered the line. The offensive began with the Battle of Pilckem Ridge on 31 July, in which Second Army played a minor role, advancing its line slightly, with 10th RF supporting 63rd Bde. It was relieved on 6 August, then spent 21 days training. Lieutenant-Col Smith left and was succeeded by Maj Cyril Carter, second-in-command of 10th Loyal North Lancashire Regiment, while Maj John Dallas Waters, formerly 10th RF's adjutant, returned from 13th RF as second-in-command.

The battalion did another tour of duty in the front line from 26 August to 3 September, then provided working parties to dig cable trenches, suffering some casualties from Mustard gas shelling. It spent two days from 14 September in support of 19th (Western) Division, but its only activity was providing carrying parties. The battalion next provided guards for prisoner-of-war camps at Bailleul and Bois Confluet, the rest of the battalion forming a composite company that continued training and providing working parties. The reduced battalion went into the line on 28 September, suffering some casualties when the neighbouring 13th RF was raided by the Germans at dawn on 30 September, and there was constant enemy shelling. The Germans put in several more attacks on 1 October to disrupt preparations for the Battle of Broodseinde planned for 4 October. 111th Brigade's role in the battle was to form a defensive flank, 13th RF moving forward with the neighbouring troops, supported by 10th RF. Throughout the day 10th RF was required to send detachments up from the support trench to assist battalions in the front line, leaving only 40 men available at one point. The brigade failed to take its objective, a line of dugouts in Gheluvelt Wood. The battalion was relieved from its position in the support trench on 8 October. It was then employed in roadmaking until going into rest billets near Hazebrouck on 26 October.

=== Winter 1917–18 ===
10th Royal Fusiliers spent the following months training, providing working parties, and holding the line in the Hollebeke and White Chateau sector of the Salient, where raiding and gas attacks were common. The battalion was now so short of men that it was reorganised from four to three companies. The CO, Lt-Col Carter, allegedly took to drink in the shelter of a dugout and was replaced on 28 January 1918 by Maj Dallas Waters, who had begun the war as a Second lieutenant. In February 1918 the manpower crisis in the BEF was so bad that one in four infantry battalions was disbanded to provide reinforcements for the others: 10th RF received drafts from the disbanded 12th Bn RF in 24th Division and 32nd (East Ham) Bn RF in 41st Division.

On 8 March 10th RF was in support when the Germans put in a serious attack in the Gheluvelt sector, heavily shelling the trenches occupied by 13th KRRC from 06.30 and occupying part of the British front line at about 14.00. Lieutenant-Col Waters took command of the brigade sector and ordered up D Company and then B Company, while A Company carried forward supplies of bombs. The situation became critical, and later the only men available to carry up more bombs were the HQ details of the two battalions. D Company was pushed back in the early evening, the enemy being held off by Lance-Corporal Charles Robertson with a Lewis gun team. Realising that he was being cut off, Robertson sent two men back for reinforcements while he and another man continued firing at the enemy. No help arrived and the two men fell back to another defended position, then were forced to withdraw a further 10 yards (9.1 m), where Robertson mounted the Lewis gun on the parapet. His comrade was killed, but despite being wounded Robertson fired off all his ammunition and made his way back with his gun. For this action he was later awarded the Victoria Cross. During the night of 8/9 March 10th RF put in three counter-attacks, the first two being unsuccessful, but A and B Companies managed to establish a trench block by about 20.40. The third attack, at dawn, involved a line of men passing bombs up the trenches to the attackers, supported by snipers. Some of the Germans ran, being shot down by machine gun and rifle fire from C Company in the chateau. By 06.45 the enemy had been cleared from the line and posts were being re-established. The battalion had lost 2 officers and 11 ORs killed, 5 officers and 47 ORs wounded and 2 missing in this unnamed action. Afterwards Lt-Col Waters received the Distinguished Service Order (DSO). On 14 March C Company operated dummy figures in No man's land to divert attention from a raid by 112th Bde.

=== Spring Offensive ===
The Germans launched their Spring Offensive against Third and Fifth Armies on 21 March, achieving a near-breakthrough. Although heavily shelled (10th RF lost 14 killed and 11 wounded when a long-range shell hit a Nissen hut occupied by A Company), Second Army was not attacked and quickly despatched reinforcements south to help stem the enemy advance. 37th Division was sent by rail on 28 March, arriving at Hébuterne next day and beginning to take over part of the line on 31 March/1 April. 10th Royal Fusiliers went into the brigade support line at Gommecourt. 37th Division came under attack on 5 April, on the final day of the offensive (the Battle of the Ancre (1918)), but 10th RF's participation was restricted to carrying forward ammunition. Casualties were suffered among the transport section from enemy shelling. The battalion took over part of the front line the following evening. Although the first German offensive had ended in this sector, intermittent shelling, raiding, and bombing by aircraft continued throughout April and May.

Gassed, by John Singer Sargent.

On 9 May the battalion moved into positions around Foncquevillers, which was subjected to a saturation bombardment by an estimated 10,000 high explosive and gas shells on 11 May. Among the gas casualties were the CO, second-in-command, adjutant, medical officer and 18 other officers and 300 men, many temporarily blinded, who all had to make their way down to the casualty stations. A battalion runner recalled that 'long lines of men were being guided along, each man with his hand on the shoulder of the man in front'. Captain Tanner and the assistant adjutant came up from the transport lines with all available men to take charge of the battalion, which remained in the line for two more days. After it was relieved there were rumours that the shattered 10th RF would be broken up, but the divisional commander disagreed and arranged for reinforcements to be drafted to it, 10 officers and 127 ORs on 17 May and a further 4 officers and 44 ORs on 23 May. It spent the month training and holding reserve positions before taking over a frontline sector on 24 June. Trench routine and working parties filled the following weeks.

=== Hundred Days Offensive ===
The Allies launched their Hundred Days Offensive on 8 August. On 19 August 37th Division moved up to take part in a dawn attack next day at Ablainzevelle. At 04.55 the creeping barrage began, and 111th Bde had little difficulty achieving its objectives. B and D Companies of 10th RF worked their way round either side of Ablainzevelle, then at 05.30 D Company consolidated on the ridge behind. C Company was detailed to mop up the village, being held up by a machine gun position that had been too close to the start line for effective artillery bombardment, but the infantry quickly dealt with the post. The battalion reported 1 officer and 7 ORs killed. Two days later 37th Division attacked again at Achiet-le-Grand and Bihucourt. 111th Bde advanced at 11.00 with 13th KRRC and 13th RB in line, supported by tanks, then 10th RF passed through at 13.20 behind a fresh hour-long barrage and took Bihucourt despite strong opposition and an open flank where a neighbouring battalion had not kept up. The village suffered heavy gas shelling that night, but the battalion was stationed outside and only lost 3 men killed in the whole operation. The following evening 10th RF served as reserve for the division's attack on Favreuil, advancing 4 miles (6.4 km) under shellfire from the railway cutting at Achiet-le-Grand. The battalion found 13th KRRC pinned down in front of Favreuil, so it moved up a valley west of the village and delivered an assault from the flank, causing the defenders to surrender. 10th RF then patrolled aggressively forward during the night to gain touch with neighbouring units. When it was relieved on 27 August 10th RF had advanced 7 miles (11 km) in five days of action, capturing 1366 prisoners, 75 machine guns and 1 field gun, at a cost of 1 officer and 32 ORs killed, mainly while moving up from the railway cutting.

After a period of training, 37th Division moved up to the edge of Havrincourt Wood for its next attack, with 10th RF entering the front line on 13 September. 111th Brigade led the division's assault on the Hindenburg Line (the Battle of Havrincourt). When the barrage began at 05.30 10th RF advanced with one company either side of the Trescault–Ribécourt-la-Tour road. Although the advance was successfully accomplished, the neighbouring division did not keep up, leaving the battalion exposed in a dangerous salient under enfilade machine gun fire. The Germans counter-attacked at midday, pushing the battalion down the trenches, and Lt-Col Tanner was ordered to withdraw from the most exposed position, but enemy fire still made the road dangerous for carrying parties. Fighting over Derby Trench and Bilhen Chapel Wood carried on all night and next day a small attack by the battalion was foiled by an enemy aircraft bombing and machine gunning the attackers. Lieutenant-Col Tanner requested artillery support for a renewed attack, but was ordered to hold fast, and the battalion was relieved on the night of 15/16 September, having lost 1 officer and 26 ORs killed. On 18 September the battalion was roused to move quickly up to support 112th Bde in the front line because of a German counter-attack, but the danger soon passed. During September Lt-Col Dallas Waters returned to command the battalion.

The Allies carried out a series of coordinated attacks along the Western Front on 26–29 September, including an assault crossing of part of the Canal du Nord. On 30 September 111th Bde found that the German bridgehead at Banteux had been abandoned, and 10th RF closed up to form an outpost line along the bank of the Escaut Canal. Attempts to push patrols across the canal were repelled, but on 5 October the enemy retreated and 13th KRRC and 13th RB crossed, pushing forward until they met opposition along the Beaurevoir Line. The division assaulted this line as part of the Battle of Cambrai on 8 October. 10th Royal Fusiliers was in position at midnight, the barrage began at 04.30 and the battalion attacked four minutes later with three companies in line, one in support, and a company of 13th RB as reserve, while 13th KRRC acted as flank guard. The battalion was held up by two belts of barbed wire that had been insufficiently cut by the artillery, and by machine guns in concrete emplacements, but with the help of tanks the Fusiliers forced their way through. Leaving C Company to mop up, the battalion moved on to capture Bel Aise Farm with many prisoners and reached its objective, a sunken road near Hurtebise Farm. 13th KRRC came up alongside about an hour later and 112th Bde passed through to continue the advance. 37th Division's advance now became a pursuit of the beaten enemy to the River Selle, but 111th Bde was withdrawn for rest at Bapaume.

The brigade was back in the line on 23 October for the second day of the BEF's next set-piece attack, the Battle of the Selle. After 5th Division had taken the first three objectives, including the village of Beaurain, 37th Division was to assemble 111th Bde behind a smoke barrage and then send it through at 08.00. The Germans defended Beaurain tenaciously, and 111th Bde's move was postponed until 08.40. When it went forward (10th RF supporting) the chief opposition came from machine guns, which were dealt with by the division's heavy mortars, and the whole of the fourth objective had been achieved by 12.45. However, the neighbouring corps on the right had been held up, and 111th Bde was unable to advance further towards Salesches until 17.15, without a barrage. 10th RF in the lead was soon brought to a stop by fire coming in from railway to the right, so it formed a defensive flank, making a few minor advances during the night before 112th Bde continued the advance next morning. 10th RF then went into billets at Neuville.

The battalion was brought forward on the night of 3/4 November for the next operation, part of the Battle of the Sambre. After a hot meal in Salesches the 10th RF was in position in support of 111th Bde at 05.00. The battalion advanced at 05.30 with B and C Companies leading, A and D in close support. After passing through 13th KRRC on the Blue Line, 10th RF continued forward, dealing with machine gun posts, D Company then pushing through Louvignies, killing or capturing all the Germans in the village. The battalion reached its objective on time and took up positions. A German barrage behind the companies cut off communications with battalion HQ, so HQ moved forward to Louvignies. At 20.00 the battalion was ordered back to Beaurain by brigade HQ, after what the RF regimental history calls a 'finished little engagement in which, for a total loss of 52 officers and men, they had captured 300 prisoners, three field guns, a motor lorry and a large number of machine guns'. It was 10th RF's last battle.

Early on 5 November 5th Division passed through and took over from the 37th, which concentrated with 10th RF staying in its 'bad' billets at Beaurain. On 11 November the division moved to Caudry, and during the march the men were told that the Armistice with Germany had come into force at 11.00, bringing hostilities to an end.

=== Post-Armistice ===
The units of 37th Division were now employed in training, education and recreation. On 1 December they began a long move to an area north of Charleroi, but from 2 to 14 December were billeted north of Le Quesnoy in bad weather until the march could resume. On 20 December the division settled into its final billets near Charleroi. Demobilisation began, with the first man leaving 10th RF on 22 December, though new drafts continued to arrive from England: 201 on 28–29 January alone. Duties included guarding the supply railhead at Rœux. During February 253 men were demobilised, and 200 more left the battalion, having volunteered for duty with 23rd RF in the occupation force in Germany (the British Army of the Rhine) . By early March the battalion was reduced to HQ and one company. 37th Division ceased to exist on 25 March and 10th RF closed its war diary on 31 March, when there were only 162 men on the strength, many of them absent on leave or detached duty. Shortly afterwards the cadre of the battalion returned to England and was disbanded at Catterick Camp.

The battalion historian estimates that 316 of the 10th RF's original 1453 volunteers were killed during the war, either with the battalion or after transfer to other units. As a whole, the battalion lost 54 officers and 688 men dead or missing between July 1915 and November 1918.

== Insignia ==
In addition to the Royal Fusiliers' cap badge and brass shoulder-title, the original other ranks of 10th RF also wore a brass numeral '10' either on the right collar point of the jacket or on both collars, and some continued to wear it during their service. 37th Division's original formation sign was a gold horseshoe pointing downwards; in November 1916 this was changed to point upwards. In 1916 the Division adopted a system of 'battle patches' on the upper arm to identify individual units and subunits. As the senior battalion of its brigade, 10th RF would have worn a coloured disc; for 111th Bde this was dark blue. Above the disc (originally on the shoulder straps, later on the upper arm) was a horizontal bar: red for A Company, dark blue for B, purple or violet for C and green for D. From late Summer 1917 or early 1918 the 'gold horseshoe' was included in this scheme, worn above the other flashes on both sleeves.

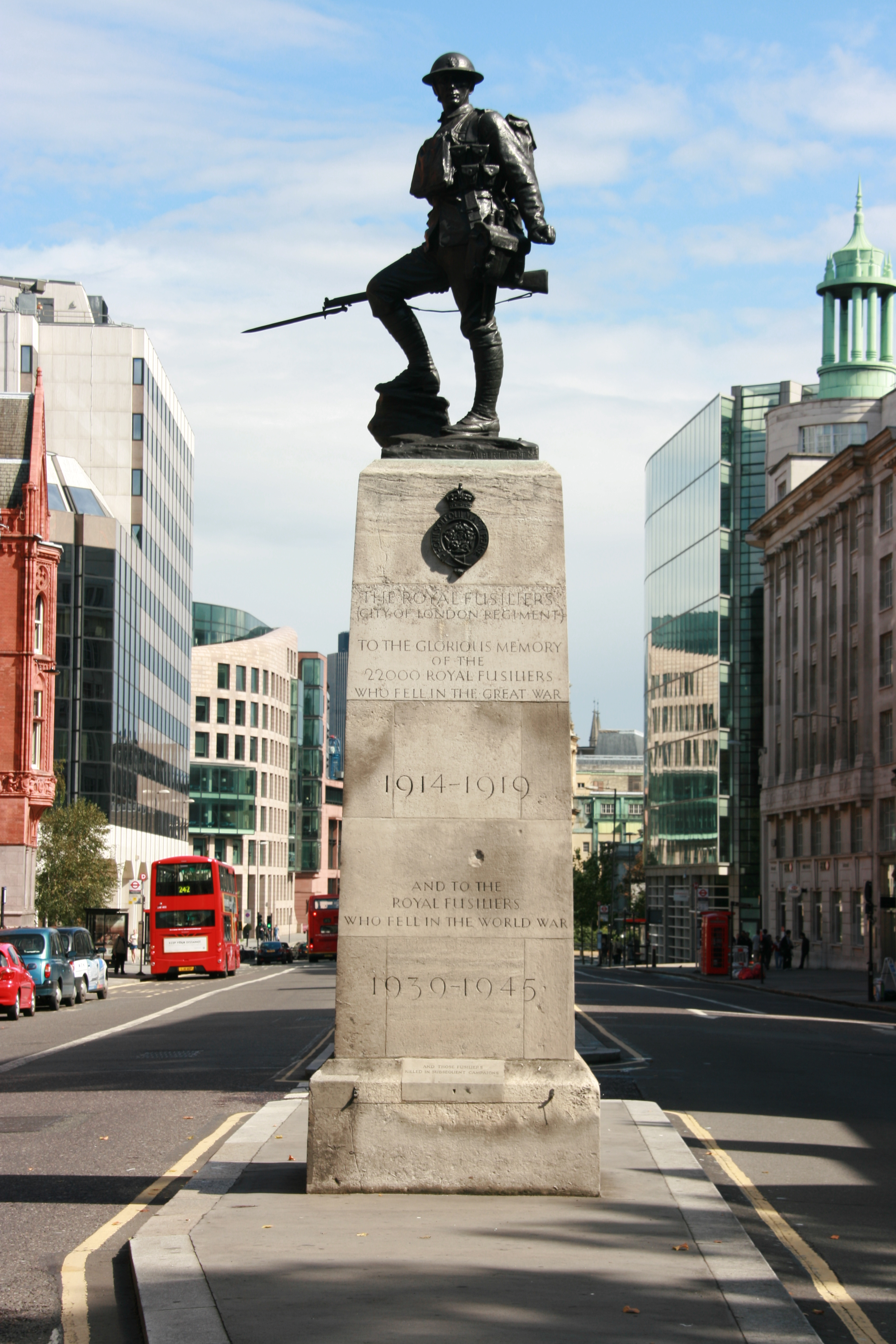
Royal Fusiliers War Memorial on High Holborn.

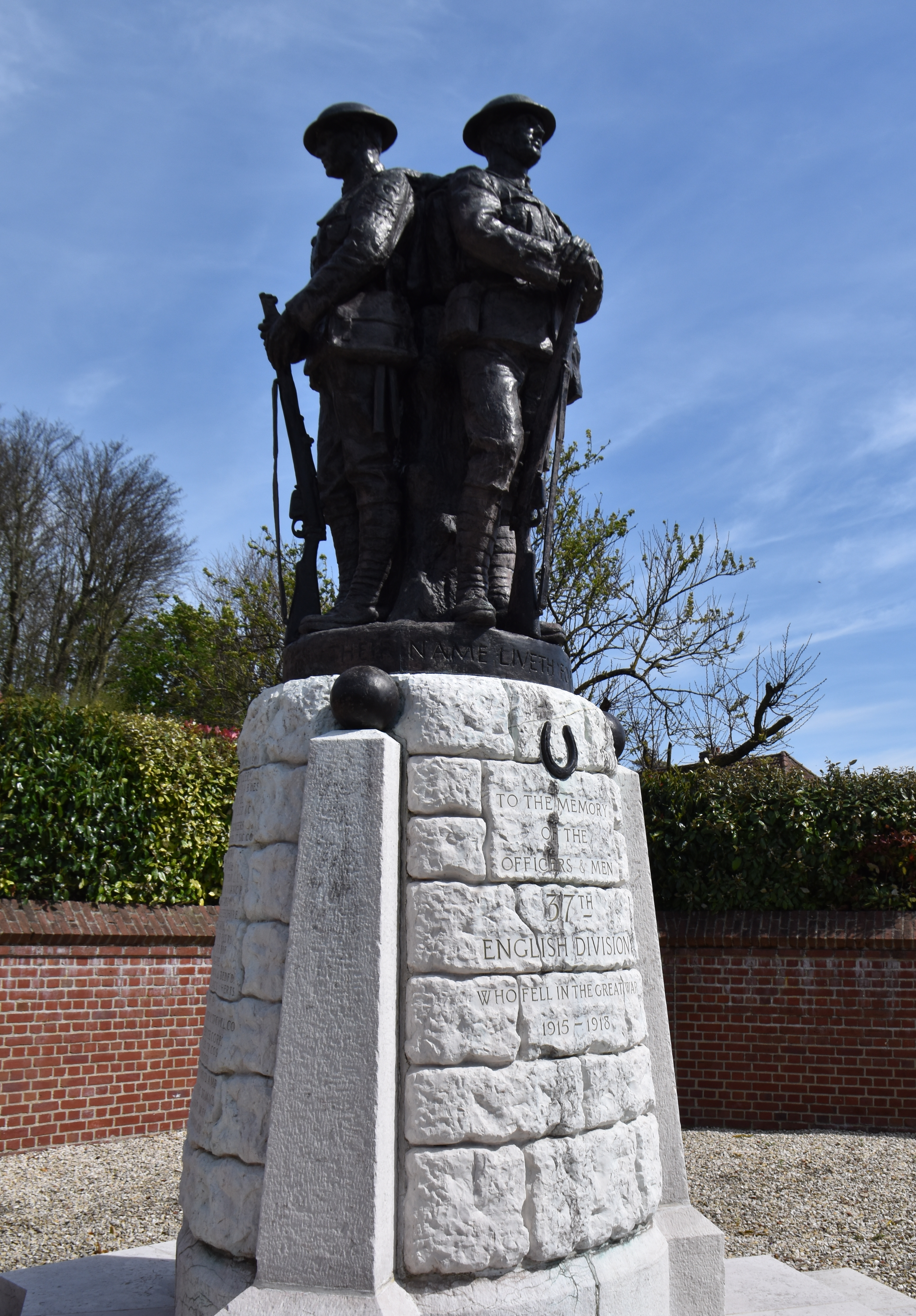
37th Division memorial at Monchy-le-Preux.

== Memorials ==
There are a memorial plaque and roll of honour to the dead of 10th Royal Fusiliers (Stockbrokers) in the church of St Michael, Cornhill, in the City of London. The plaque refers to the King's Colour presented to the battalion in January 1919: this was placed above the plaque but was subsequently stolen, leaving only the bare staff. Alongside the battalion's memorial plaque is another to Brig-Gen Hon Robert White, the battalion's long-time commanding officer who died in 1936.

The Royal Fusiliers War Memorial, with its bronze figure of a Fusilier sculpted by Albert Toft, stands at Holborn Bar on the boundary of the City of London. A panel on the back of the pedestal lists all the RF battalions, including 10th (Stockbrokers), 10th (B) of the Intelligence Corps, and 31st (Reserve).

The 37th Division memorial sculpted by Lady Feodora Gleichen (sister of the division's first commander) was erected at Monchy-le-Preux.

The war memorial in the London Stock Exchange in Paternoster Square includes names of many members of 10th RF.

== Commanders ==
The following officers commanded 10th RF:

- Lt-Col Claude Hawker, Coldstream Guards, September–December 1914
- Lt-Col Hon Robert White, promoted to command 6 December 1914; promoted to command a brigade 12 September 1916
- Lt-Col Rice, Scottish Horse, temporary 12 September 1916, later promoted; wounded 10 April 1917
- Lt-Col R.A. Smith, temporary 10 April 1917, later promoted; left August 1917
- Lt-Col Cyril Carter, King's Own (Royal Lancaster Regiment), appointed August 1917
- Lt-Col John Dallas Waters, promoted 28 January 1918; gassed 11 May 1918; returned September and commanded to demobilisation
- Capt Tanner, temporary 11 May 1918; acting Lt-Col to September 1918
