= 26th (Service) Battalion, Royal Fusiliers (Bankers) =

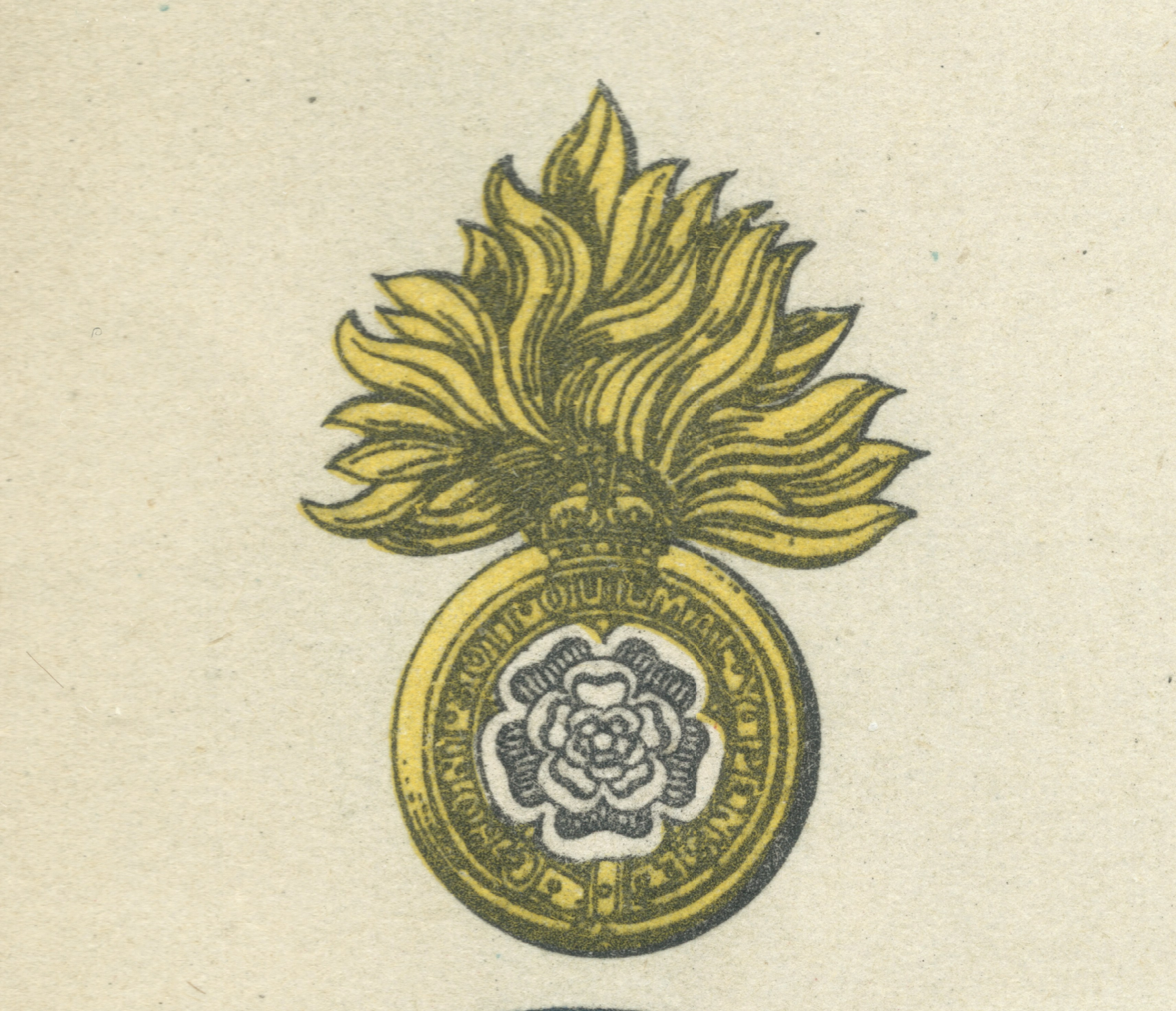
- Cap badge of the Royal Fusiliers
- Active: 17 July 1915–27 March 1920
- Allegiance: United Kingdom
- Branch: New Army
- Type: Pals battalion
- Role: Infantry
- Size: One Battalion
- Part of: 41st Division
- Garrison/HQ: London
- Patron: Lord Mayor and Corporation of London
- Engagements: Battle of the Somme; Battle of Messines; Third Battle of Ypres; German spring offensive Hundred Days Offensive

Commanders
- Colonel of the Regiment: Sir Charles Johnston (1914–15); Sir Charles Wakefield (1915–16)

The 26th (Service) Battalion, Royal Fusiliers (Bankers) (26th RF) was an infantry unit recruited as part of 'Kitchener's Army' in World War I. It was raised in the summer of 1915 by the Lord Mayor and City of London and recruited mainly from bank clerks and accountants. It served on the Western Front from May 1916, seeing action on the Somme and at Ypres. It was sent to the Italian Front, returning to the west in time to be flung into the breach during the German spring offensive. It then took part in the final advance to victory, eventually reaching the Rhine as part of the Army of Occupation.

== Recruitment and training ==
Alfred Leete's recruitment poster for Kitchener's Army.

On 6 August 1914, less than 48 hours after Britain's declaration of war, Parliament sanctioned an increase of 500,000 men for the Regular British Army. The newly appointed Secretary of State for War, Earl Kitchener of Khartoum, issued his famous call to arms: 'Your King and Country Need You', urging the first 100,000 volunteers to come forward. Men flooded into the recruiting offices and the 'first hundred thousand' were enlisted within days. This group of six divisions with supporting arms became known as Kitchener's First New Army, or 'K1'.

Shortly after the outbreak of war the Lord Mayor and Corporation of London began recruiting men working for the financial businesses in the city: the resulting 10th (Service) Battalion, Royal Fusiliers (Stockbrokers) was the first of the 'Pals battalions' in which men of a similar background joined up in order to serve together. So successful was the 'Pals' concept that in February 1915 Kitchener approached the Metropolitan Borough Councils in the County of London, and the 'Great Metropolitan Recruiting Campaign' went ahead in April, with each mayor asked to raise a unit of local men for 'K5'. At this time the City of London held another recruiting drive, this time among bank clerks and accountants, resulting in the formation of the 26th (Service) Battalion, Royal Fusiliers (Bankers) on 17 July 1915. The battalion was formed by Major William Pitt, a former Volunteer officer, and Sir Charles Johnston (Lord Mayor 1914–15) and Sir Charles Wakefield (Lord Mayor 1915–16) each served as the battalion's Honorary Colonel. It assembled at Marlow and High Beech in Buckinghamshire for its initial training.

Once the battalion was up to full strength in November 1915 it moved to Aldershot where it joined 124th Brigade in 41st Division, the last 'K' division to be formed. It was brigaded with 32nd Royal Fusiliers (East Ham) (32nd RF), 10th Queen's Regiment (Battersea) (10th Queen's) and 21st King's Royal Rifle Corps (Yeoman Rifles) (21st KRRC). At Aldershot the battalions were equipped with modern rifles, specialists such as Lewis gunners, signallers and 'bombers' were selected and trained, and route marches were carried out in full marching order. Lieutenant-Colonel the Hon W.F.J. North, formerly of the Queen's Own Oxfordshire Hussars, was appointed commanding officer (CO) on 15 December. In February 1916 the division began its final battle training, for which 124th Bde was based at Stanhope Lines, Aldershot. On 4 May 26th RF under Lt-Col North boarded three trains at Farnborough for Southampton Docks. There it embarked on the SS Mona's Queen and landed at Le Havre next day to join the British Expeditionary Force (BEF) on the Western Front.

=== 31st (Reserve) Battalion ===
On 21 October 1915 the depot companies of the 10th (Stockbrokers) and 26th (Bankers) battalions were combined at Colchester to form the 31st (Reserve) Battalion, Royal Fusiliers, as a Local Reserve unit with the role of training reinforcement drafts for the two parent battalions. 31st (R) Battalion moved to Leamington Spa in Warwickshire and joined the 24th Reserve Brigade (an all-Royal Fusiliers formation). By January 1916 it was at Abingdon in Oxfordshire, and in April 1916 the brigade moved to Edinburgh in Scotland. On 1 September 1916 the Training Reserve (TR) was established following the introduction of conscription, and 31st (R) Bn RF became 107th Training Reserve Battalion, though the training staff retained their Royal Fusiliers badges. On 6 September 1917 it was redesignated 265th (Infantry) Battalion, TR, and on 1 November 1917 it reverted to the Royal Fusiliers as 52nd (Graduated) Bn. It was then at Ipswich in Suffolk as part of 217th Brigade in 72nd Division. 72nd Division was broken up in early 1918, and in February the battalion transferred to 204th Bde of 68th Division at Newmarket, where it remained for the rest of the war. On 8 February 1919 it was converted into a service battalion and joined the British Army of the Rhine, where it was absorbed into 23rd (Service) Bn, RF (1st Sportsmen's) on 4 April.

== Service ==
By 8 May 1916 41st Division had completed its concentration between Hazebrouck and Bailleul in Second Army's area, with 26th RF billeted at Outtersteene. While continuing its training, parties from the new division were sent up to the line for instruction in trench warfare from experienced units. Those from 26th RF were attached to the 5th Cameron Highlanders of 9th (Scottish) Division in Ploegsteert Wood ('Plugstreet Wood'). 41st Division then relieved 9th (S) Division in the Ploegsteert trenches and the battalions began the routine of two weeks in the trenches, one in support and one in reserve. The battalions also had to supply working parties, and they began to suffer a trickle of casualties, particularly from chance shellfire or random machine gun fire, or during patrols and raids.

=== Flers–Courcelette ===
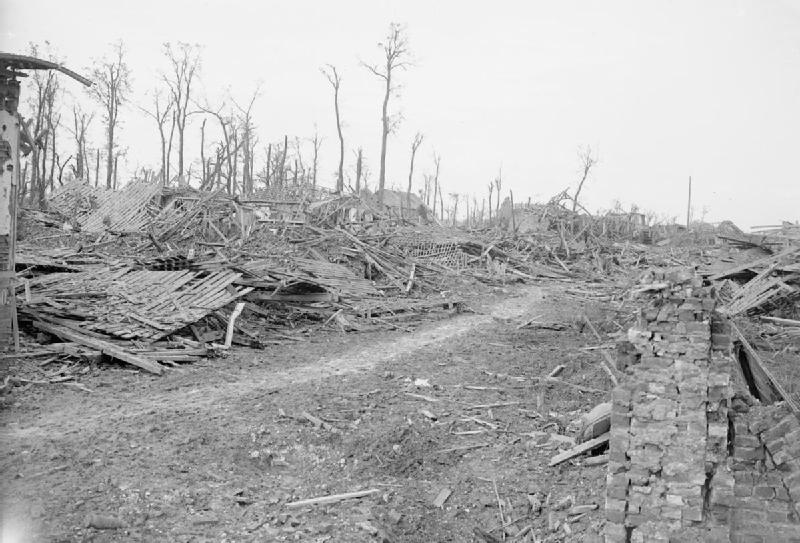
The ruins of the main street of Flers after the battle.

When 41st Division arrived on the Western Front the BEF was preparing for that summer's 'Big Push', the Battle of the Somme, which began on 1 July. On 23 August 26th RF entrained for Pont-Remy, where it undertook three weeks' special training at Vauchelles near Abbeville and then at Bécordel before being called upon to participate in the offensive. The training included operating in a wood similar to the notorious Delville Wood on the Somme. On the afternoon of 14 September the brigade was guided to trenches north-east of Delville Wood, where orders were issued for an attack next day (the Battle of Flers-Courcelette). 124th Brigade on the division's right formed up during the night, with 21st KRRC (left) and 10th Queen's (right) in eight waves, the leading waves in No man's land, the others stretching back to 'Brown Trench'. They were supported by 26th and 32nd RF respectively, drawn up behind them in four waves between 'Green Trench' and 'Inner Trench'. 26th RF's four lines comprised A, B, C and D Companies in succession. The division had four objectives and the brigade was intended to take them in succession with the battalions in this formation, until they were beyond the village of Gueudecourt. For this its first attack, 41st Division had support from tanks, also making their first ever appearance on a battlefield. Ten Mark I tanks of D Company, Heavy Section, Machine Gun Corps, were assigned to the division, formed up behind the infantry.

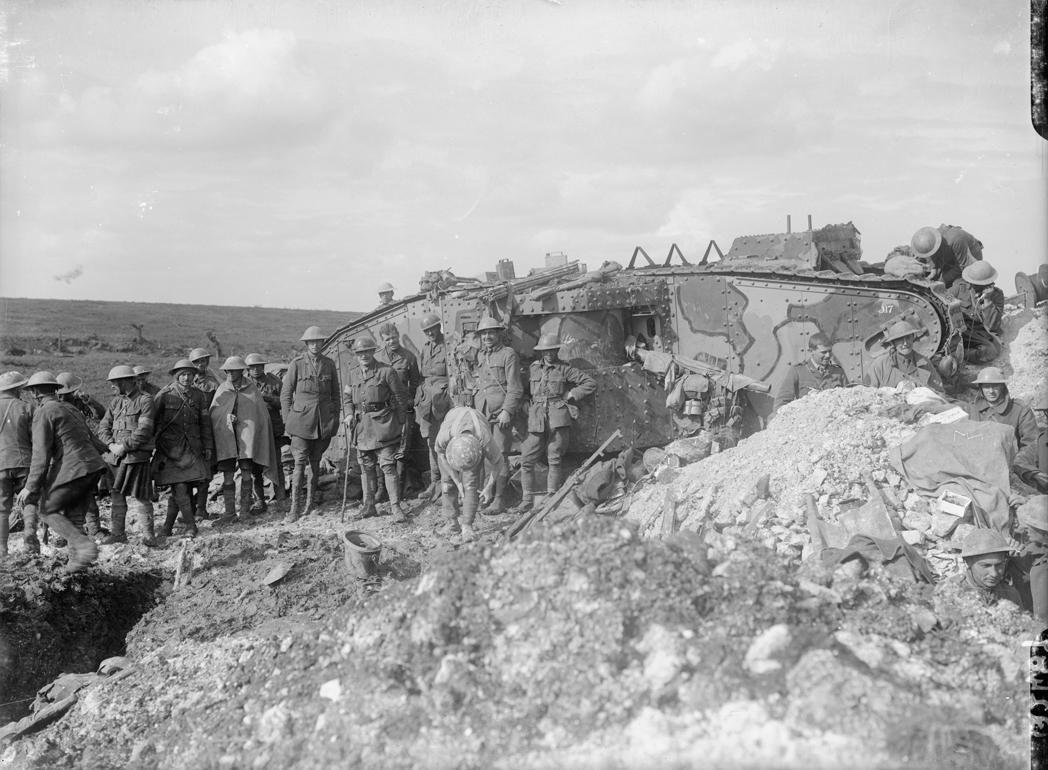
D17, one of the tanks supporting 41st Division, broken down after its return from Flers, photographed by Ernest Brooks.

The brigade moved forward at 06.20, following a Creeping barrage. Seven tanks managed to cross the start line, and there was little resistance in the German front trench – 'Tea Support Trench' – which had been shattered by the 3-day British bombardment. Many of the surviving Germans ran from the tanks, though several machine gun teams stuck to their task and caused heavy casualties to the leading waves. By about 06.30 26th RF had followed the attackers to within 80 yards (73 m) of the first objective – 'Switch Trench' – but found that the first six lines were advancing through their own barrage in a half-right direction and that the left flank was 300 yards (270 m) east of Flers, when it should have been on the Flers road. The battalion halted to rectify the mistake and bring men back out of the barrage. However, Switch Trench had been taken with very little opposition by 06.50, and the infantry followed the barrage to form up in front of the second objective, 'Flers Trench'. Uncut barbed wire held them up, but this was crushed by two of the tanks. The barrage lifted from Flers Trench at 07.45 and the infantry went forward again, finding the trench to be severely damaged by the artillery fire so they were able to take it without difficulty. A mixed party pressed on under Capt Henry Robinson (32nd RF) and took 150 prisoners, though it was now suffering casualties from rifle and machine gun fire. 124th Brigade had got ahead of its neighbours, and it became difficult to sustain the advance because of the lack of flank support. 26th RF remained in Flers Trench, waiting for 122nd Bde and the tanks to clear the village. Only one tank, D6, was left in action with 124th Bde. 26th RF watched as it went forward about 10.15, followed by some of 10th Queen's and 21st KRRC as they attempted to get to the third and fourth objectives. But their casualties were heavy, particularly among officers, and they withdraw to Flers Trench, which 26th RF was consolidating. At 15.00 124th Bde was ordered to advance to 'Gird Trench', 26th RF went forward, but was held up 150 yards (140 m) short by fire from its left flank. At 17.00 an order was passed to retire, but 26th RF could not discover whether it was genuine and tried to stay in place. Nevertheless, the troops to the right ran back, and the battalion eventually fell back to an old trench that was being held by two Vickers gun teams from the Machine Gun Company. With its flanks open, and out of contact with any headquarters, the battalion remained there until dusk when it withdrew to the line that 124th Bde was consolidating between the second and third objectives. The brigade was relieved by 123rd Bde at 23.00 and 26th RF went back to the support line, except for Capt Thomas Etchell's company out in front of the others, which had to remain in place until the following night. Early on 18 September the battalion went back to the transport lines and then marched back to camp, where it remained training for the rest of the month. Its casualties had been 5 officers and 33 other ranks (ORs) killed or died of wounds, 4 officers (including Lt Sir Walter Aston Blount, 10th Baronet) and 140 ORs wounded, and 58 ORs missing. Lieutenant-Col North relinquished command on 27 September and the Brigade major of 122nd Bde, Maj Gwyn Gwyn-Thomas (2nd Lancers (Gardner's Horse)), was promoted to succeed him.

=== Transloy Ridges ===
On 2 October 26th RF made an exhausting march on muddy roads in heavy rain to bivouac at Montauban. Next day the company commanders were sent forward to reconnoitre the trenches they were due to take over, and that evening 41st Division relieved the New Zealand Division, which had launched the Battle of the Transloy Ridges. A and B Companies of 26th RF were in Flers Trench, C and D in Flers Support Trench, where they spent two days under heavy shellfire before moving forward to the recently captured Gird Trench and Gird Support Trench. On 7 October 122nd and 124th Bdes continued the operation. This time the two Royal Fusiliers battalions led 124th Bde's attack. A and B Companies of 26th RF advanced in waves of half companies, followed by C and D Companies in support. As they crossed a steep bank halfway to their objective of 'Bayonet Trench' they were hit by unsuppressed machine guns. The first wave got about 350 yards (320 m) forward from their starting point, to within about 50 yards (46 m) of the first objective, but could get no further. They were forced to stop and dig in, linking up a line of shell holes. Here 21st KRRC and D Company of 10th Queen's reinforced them. 26th RF had lost 14 officers and 240 ORs and that night the whole brigade in the front line mustered only the equivalent of a single battalion. They were harassed by enemy snipers, but no German counter-attack appeared. By dawn the divisional pioneer battalion (19th Middlesex Regiment) had dug a communication trench forward to them from the old British front line

26th RF was relieved on the night of 8/9 October and moved back to 'Factory Trench' in the rear, where it was subjected to more shelling than when it was in the front line. The following night it was moved further back to bivouacs in 'Caterpillar Wood'. Then after a series of train journeys it arrived at La Clytte on 22 October, where it was billeted. After picking up some reinforcement drafts, 41st Division took over a quiet sector of the front on the southern edge of the Ypres Salient under Second Army once more. Here 26th RF established a trench routine of alternating with 21st KRRC: six days in the line, six in support at 'Ridge Wood', six more in the line, and then six in the muddy 'Murrumbidgee Camp' at La Clytte, where it trained and provided working parties. The area was so waterlogged that only shallow trenches could be used, with built-up parapets that required constant maintenance during the harsh winter. There was active raiding by both sides. On 15 December a patrol of 26th RF attacked two German sentries and obtained identification of their unit. Later that night the barrage for a German raiding party caught a wiring party of 26th RF in No man's land and the raiders got into the battalion's front line, where they were driven off by an isolated Lewis gunner, who used his revolver when his gun jammed.

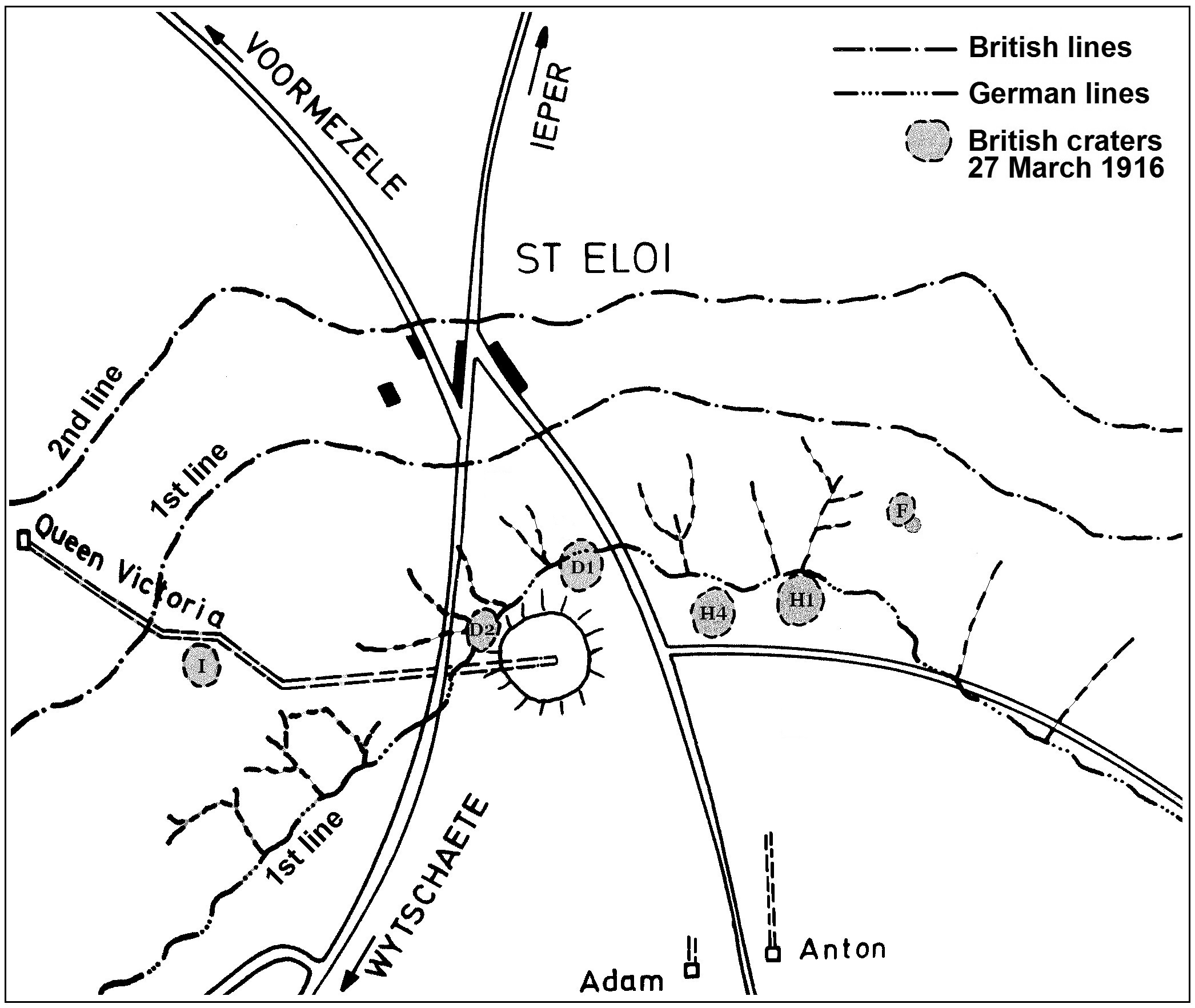
The St Eloi mine of 7 June 1917.

=== Messines ===
In early 1917 Second Army was preparing for the forthcoming Battle of Messines. The object of this attack was to capture the Wytschaete–Messines Ridge with its fine observation positions over the British line. In the weeks before the battle units were withdrawn for careful rehearsals behind the lines, and leaders down to platoon level were taken to see a large model of the ridge constructed at Scherpenberg. Working parties dug six lines of assembly trenches extending into No man's land, some as close as 150 yards (140 m) to the German sentry posts. Patrols thoroughly explored the ground over which they were to attack. A mass of heavy, medium and field artillery began systematic destruction of enemy strongpoints and batteries on 21 May and the bombardment became intense from 31 May. The area to be attacked was obvious to the enemy; however the surprise element was the line of 19 great mines dug under the ridge. 124th Brigade's role was to carry out a converging attack on the St Eloi salient after the mine under the head of the salient was fired. Battalion HQ and B and D Companies of 26th RF moved out of 'Micmac Camp' at 06.00 on 5 June and made their way into the trenches to take up position in the front line. That night they patrolled No man's land and found the German wire thoroughly cut by the artillery; the rest of the battalion moved up to occupy 'GHQ 2nd Line'. The artillery duel continued next day (6 June), then that night the battalion moved up to its assembly positions. It was supposed to be in place by 01.10, two hours before Zero, but was held up in the crowded communication trenches and did not get into position until 02.35, by which time the men were 'a bit tired' but 'in splendid spirits' according to the battalion War Diary. The companies formed up in successive waves on tapes laid between the support and front line trenches.

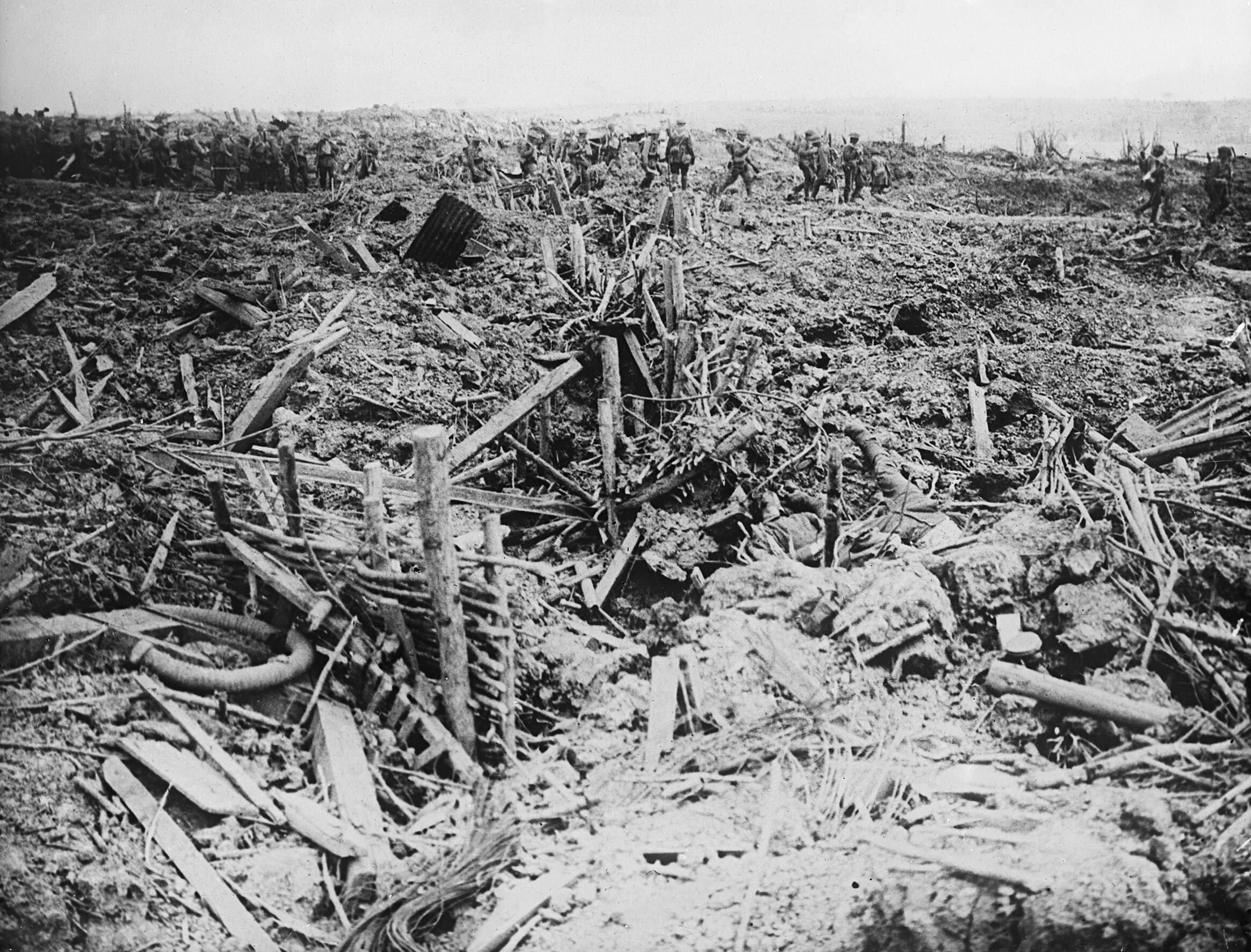
A smashed German trench on Messines Ridge, June 1917.

At 03.10 the British artillery barrage opened and the troops rose and went forwards. Some 5 seconds later the St Eloi mine went up in an 'earth-shaking' explosion. With 95,600 pounds (43,400 kg) of ammonal, the St Eloi mine was the largest fired that day and the resulting crater, some 17 feet (5.2 m) deep and 176 feet (54 m) wide, dwarfed all those from former tunnel warfare in the area and left the surroundings strewn with concrete blocks from shattered dugouts. The startled fusiliers checked briefly, then advanced in good order following 32nd RF under bright moonlight, although the visibility became bad because of the smoke and dust from the mine explosions and barrage. The enemy defensive barrage was weak because so many of their batteries had been knocked out over preceding days, and it came down late, only catching the battalion's rear wave as it crossed No man's land, and causing little damage. The attack went exactly to schedule: 32nd RF took the enemy front and reserve trenches and at Zero + 35 minutes 26th RF prepared to attack the next objective, the 'Damstrasse'. This was a raised driveway leading to a former chateau, which crossed the brigade's front at the rear of the St Eloi Salient. The Damstrasse was believed to be strongly fortified, probably with concrete pillboxes built into it. The officers of 21st KRRC had been concerned about it, and the chief of staff of Second Army, Major-General Charles Harington promised them to make it a particular target for destruction by 9.2-inch howitzers. As a result, 26th RF captured their section of it with very little resistance and took 300–400 prisoners as they emerged from their dugouts, those Germans who resisted being bombed out. The battalion immediately began digging in (the 'Blue Line') immediately beyond the Damstrasse, covered by a protective barrage. After a two-hour halt for reorganisation and further bombardment, the other battalions of 124th Bde advanced rapidly from 26th RF's Blue Line to the final Black Line objective, where they opened fire on German infantry and artillery retreating down the other side of the ridge. The brigade's work for the day was over by 08.10, other than consolidating the positions they had won, against a counter-attack that never materialised. At 15.10 another division passed through to complete the attack. Next day 26th RF went back to Ridge Wood Camp.

=== Ypres ===
After another spell holding the line in front of the Damstrasse and then in reserve, 26th RF went back to 'Ontario Camp' on 29 June and then to the Meteren training area, where it spent a month training and absorbing new drafts. Lieutenant-Col Gwyn-Thomas left on 19 July to return to command his Indian Cavalry regiment and the second-in-command, Maj A. Maxwell, was in temporary command of 26th RF for much of the summer. On 29 July the battalion returned to Ridge Wood Camp and the following day it moved into the Bluff Tunnels ready for the opening of the Flanders Offensive (the Third Battle of Ypres). This began on 31 July with the Battle of Pilckem Ridge. Second Army had a minor role in covering the right flank of the main offensive by Fifth Army. 41st Division attacked with only limited objectives. 124th Brigade was the divisional reserve, and 26th RF was to support 123rd Bde. An hour before Zero (03.50) heavy rain began to fall, the shellholes filled with water and the men could hardly keep their feet on the slippery mud. The barrage began at Zero and 123rd Bde's attack went in. At 06.45 B and D Companies of 26th RF were ordered to move out of the Bluff Tunnels to take over 'Impact Trench' and 'Imperial Support Trench' from 21st KRRC, which had been sent up to reinforce 123rd Bde; the rest of 26th RF followed, moving up to 'Old British Front Line' at 12.00. 41st Division's attack had been successful. Next day, 26th RF and 10th Queen's resumed the attack at 'Battle Wood' but the two leading companies of 26th RF lost direction and were hit by a heavy enemy barrage. They made little progress and could only reinforce a British-held trench by the Klein Zillebeke road. The two battalions were unable to continue the planned advance towards the Zandvoorde Line. In the heavy rain movement became difficult. By 14.00 two companies of 26th RF had been left in the front line with 21st KRRC and the rest of the battalion withdrew to Impact Trench. In the following days, with Battalion HQ in 'Fusilier Wood', 26th RF alternated with 32nd RF and 11th Royal West Kents (122nd Bde) in holding Impact Trench under rain and shellfire. On 5 August the battalion 'stood to' while the enemy counter-attacked at nearby Hollebeke, but the attack was driven off. Next day the battalion was relieved and went back to 'Scottish Wood' to rest and clean up. It went back into the line from 11 to 15 August, when it had to dig a new front line trench in rain and mud. Afterwards the battalion was taken by bus to Thieshoek. In the whole operation 26th RF had lost 3 officers and 22 ORs killed, 8 ORs missing, and 3 officers and 114 ORs wounded. It did not return to the line until the middle of September after a period of refitting and training, particularly in techniques for dealing with pillboxes.

By then Second Army had taken the lead in Flanders, and the Battle of the Menin Road Ridge on 20 September was to give the offensive renewed impetus. This time the attackers were shielded by several barrages of shells and machine gun fire, and a spell of dry weather had reduced the mud. 26th RF had trained specifically for its role in this attack, for which 124th Bde's objective was the 'Tower Hamlets' Spur. 26th RF returned to Ridge Wood on 18 September, and moved into its assembly positions the following evening. The approach march was difficult: at one point 26th RF had to step off the duckboard track to allow 32nd RF to pass, and the men had great trouble getting out of the mud back onto the track. Zero was at 05.50: 21st KRRC led the attack with 10th Queen's on its right, 26th and 32nd RF respectively in support. Both support battalions advanced close behind the leading troops, and the enemy's defensive barrage fell behind them, but 26th RF ran into heavy machine gun fire almost immediately. The new commanding officer, Lt-Col Graham McNicol, was wounded early on, and in less than 10 minutes all but one of the 19 officers in the attack had become a casualty. Lieutenant S.H. Firth and the wounded 2nd Lieutenant F.A.B. Jones held the survivors together, but the battalion was pinned down, and had no communication to the rear until a staff officer arrived with some carrier pigeons. In response to a pigeon message, 20th Durham Light Infantry (DLI) of 123rd Bde came up at 16.00, but the enemy artillery had got the range of the position and casualties continued to mount: all five 26th RF officers sent up from the rear were hit before nightfall. At one point a German counter-attack penetrated past the left flank and the men in the support trench had to turn round and fire to their rear: this drove off the attackers. 26th RF remained in this position through the whole of 21 September, and by the morning of 22 September was running short of food and ammunition. Private Sturgis got back through the barrage and led up a carrying party with supplies. The battalion was finally withdrawn early on the morning of 24 September, long after the rest of 41st Division. Its casualties amounted to 6 officers and 27 ORs killed, 2 officers (including Lt-Col McNicol) and 15 ORs died of wounds, 14 officers and 246 ORs wounded, 4 officers and 45 ORs missing. Major Maxwell took over temporary command again until Lt-Col Robert Hammond arrived on 24 September, when the battalion was billeted at Borre.

41st Division was now sent to the Flanders Coast. On 28 September 26th RF went by bus to join the rest of 124th Bde at Ghyvelde. That evening the camp was attacked by a German aircraft that dropped three bombs, one of which exploded just outside Battalion HQ. The new CO, Lt-Col Hammond, and the adjutant were both mortally wounded, and Maj Maxwell and the medical officer were among the other wounded. Major Henry Tuite took command next day, and was later promoted to Lt-Col. On the coast the battalion took turns of duty holding the line at Coxyde and Nieuport Bains, suffering some heavy bombardments. It also provided Lewis gun teams for anti-aircraft defence of the nearby Royal Field Artillery positions.

=== Italy ===
On 7 November 1917 41st Division was informed that it was to be transferred to reinforce the Italian Front, and entrainment began on 12 November. The division completed its concentration in the Mantua area by 18 November. 124th Brigade then undertook a five-day march of 120 miles (190 km) to take up positions between Vicenza and Grisgnano. The gruelling march was conducted in battle order with advanced guards and night outposts. On 1 December the brigade took up a sector of the front line along the River Piave around Nervesa, and remained there for the rest of the month, under occasional shellfire and bombing. In January 1918 the battalions moved to the Montello sector, manning a steep hillside in very cold weather. In early February they moved to the slopes of Monte Grappa, then to billets around Biadene (Montebelluna) and finally to Limena. While there the division received orders to return to the Western Front. On 28 February 1918 it concentrated in the Camposampiero entraining area and completed detrainment at Doullens and Mondicourt on 9 March.

By early 1918 the BEF was suffering a manpower crisis. It was forced to reduce infantry brigades from four to three battalions each, breaking up the surplus units to reinforce the others. 41st Division conformed to the new establishment when it returned from Italy. In 124th Bde the two junior battalions, 32nd RF and 21st KRRC, were both disbanded, and 20th DLI was transferred in from 123rd Bde. 26th RF received a draft from 32nd RF on 18 March 1918.

=== Spring Offensive ===
At this time 41st Division was in GHQ Reserve. On 21 March 26th RF marched to Saulty Station under orders to go to the Baizeaux training area, but the long-anticipated German spring offensive began that morning. The trains were redirected to Achiet-le-Grand where the battalion detrained and marched into Favreuil at 06.30 on 22 March. 41st Division then moved up to reinforce Third Army's front, which was under intense pressure. During the night of 22/23 March 124th Bde went to the left sector of IV Corps, where a gap had been opening. It occupied the half-dug rear defences (the 'Green Line') and did much to improve the positions during the night. They were well-sited, mostly on a reverse slope, with a belt of old wire about 80 yards (73 m) in front. 10th Queen's and 20th DLI relieved the exhausted troops in front and 26th RF took over the support trench. During 23 March the enemy made six separate attacks on the brigade's line, the last by dismounted cavalry, but failed against the two battalions' rifle and machine gun fire and a field artillery battery galloping up and firing over open sights. Unlike some sectors of the front, 124th Bde had succeeded in maintaining its positions on the Green Line intact all day. That night 26th RF sent C Company forward to reinforce 20th DLI. Next day (24 March) the Germans made repeated attacks against the troops to 124th Bde's right, who began to fall back, and 26th RF sent A Company forward to form a defensive flank. 124th Brigade continued to hold the Green Line, covering the retreat of other brigades. However, by the late afternoon the whole position had deteriorated and 124th Bde was ordered to withdraw to the Favreuil Line about 19.00. Lieutenant-Col Tuite was mortally wounded while commanding the rearguard; some men tried to carry him back, but seeing how near the enemy were he ordered them to leave him. The second-in-command, Maj Etchells, took temporary command. As the Germans continued to advance on the right, 124th Bde went back further that night, to a previously selected line behind the Bapaume–Arras road, with A and B Companies of 26th RF holding the left of the brigade front near Sapignies. The brigade held this line until midday on 25 March, but it received no rations or ammunition, and the left flank was now exposed, so in the afternoon it was ordered back to Bihucourt. The two companies of 26th RF on the left withdrew by half platoons, each giving covering fire to the other, and supported by some tanks of 10th Battalion Tank Corps that temporarily held back the enemy. These two companies then dug in alongside another division between Achiet-le-Grand and Achiet-le-Petit, which they held until the night of 26/27 March. Meanwhile, on the night of 25/26 March 124th Bde was ordered to concentrate at Gommecourt, where every available man from the brigade transport lines had been sent with a rifle to join the detachments and stragglers. About 05.00 the brigade occupied a line here, in case the troops now holding the front lines were forced to retire. However, apart from being machine-gunned by enemy aircraft, the line was unmolested on 26 March and the mixed-up units were able to sort themselves out. That night the brigade was marched back to Bienvillers-au-Bois for rest. However, fighting continued and at midday on 28 March 124th Bde was ordered to return to the Gommecourt Line (the 'Purple Line'). 26th RF sent forward patrols to get in contact with the brigades of 62nd (2nd West Riding) Division holding the front line. About 18.00 26th RF received an order from 186th (2/2nd West Riding) Brigade to counterattack the enemy who had occupied Rossignol Wood. The battalion advanced in four waves and had gone about 700 yards (640 m) when 124th Bde countermanded the order and it returned to its trenches. In the afternoon of 29 March the enemy opened a bombardment on Gommecourt. 41st Division was ordered to relieve a battalion of 42nd (East Lancashire) Division, but this required virtually all the strength of the depleted 124th Bde. 10th Queen's, which had borne the brunt of the fighting and was much depleted, was reorganised as two composite companies, of which A Company was attached to 26th RF until 31 March. The battalion held a sector of the line east of Bucquoy, but the fighting died down, the German offensive having failed.

By 31 March the battalion had lost 3 officers and 38 ORs killed, 17 officers and 127 ORs wounded, and 1 officer and 102 ORs missing.

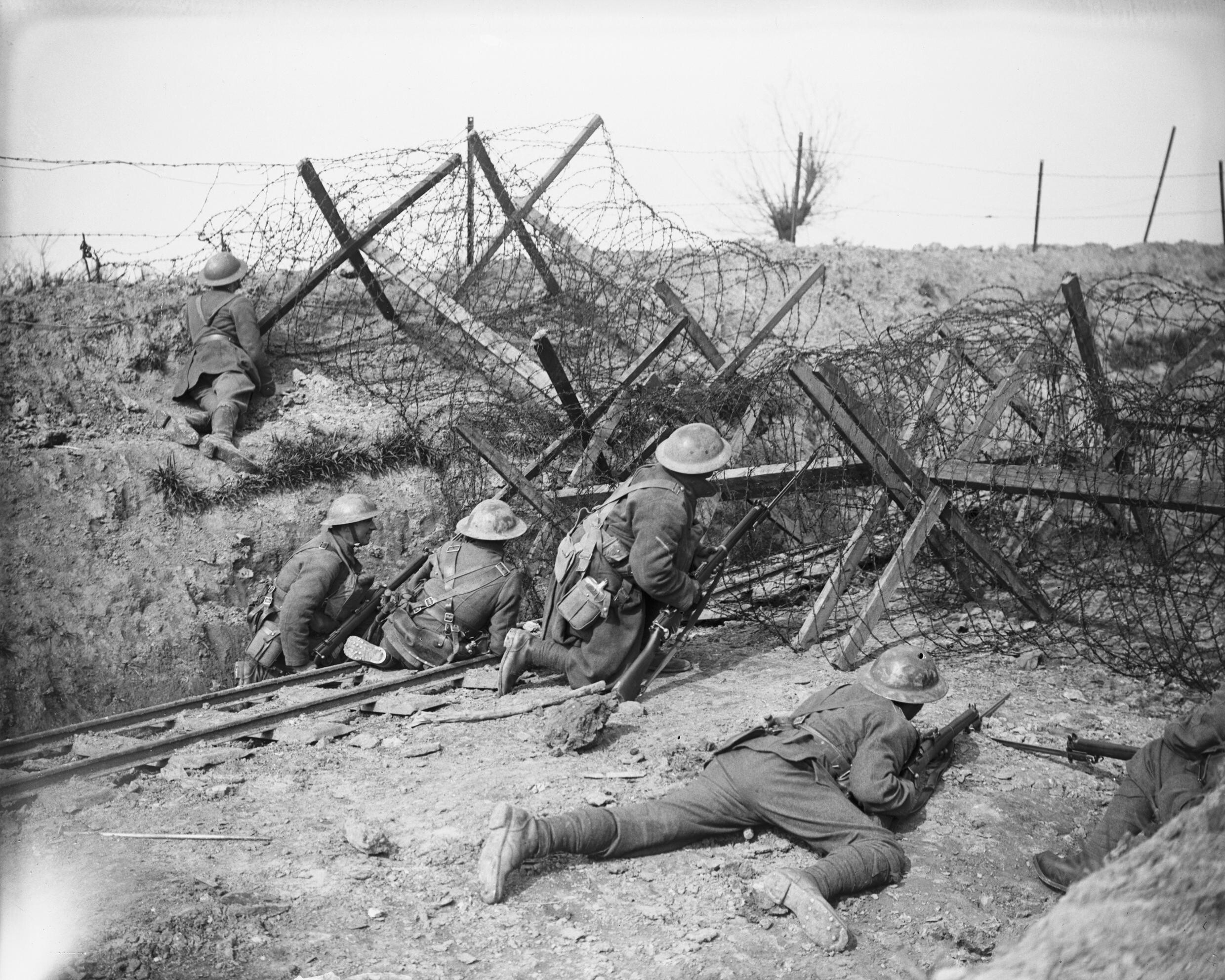
Officer and men of 124th Bde manning a roadblock on the St Jean road outside Ypres, 29 April 1918 (photographed by John Warwick Brooke).

=== Ypres Salient ===
41st Division was finally relieved on the night of 1/2 April after 10 days' fighting, and was taken by motor bus to a rest area. It then moved north by marching and train to rejoin Second Army at Ypres, which was now considered a quiet area. Henry Robinson transferred from 26th RF to take command as Lt-Col. On the night of 7/8 April 26th RF moved up to the line in the Passchendaele sector, at the head of the salient that had been captured during the Third Battle of Ypres. It deployed two companies in the front line, one in support and one in reserve. Two days later the Germans launched the second phase of their Spring offensive (the Battle of the Lys) just south of Ypres. They made such rapid progress that by 13 April the position in the Passchendaele salient was critical. The defences were thinned out that night, 26th RF being pulled out to man two strongpoints ('Carte Keep' and 'Mills Keep') on the 'Oxford' and 'Cambridge' roads, leaving 10th Queen's to form an outpost line in front. Second Army was then ordered to evacuate the salient, and 26th RF withdrew on the night of 15/16 April to begin digging a new line of resistance at 'White Chateau', with B Company left in the forward area as an outpost, reinforced by C Company on 20 April. On 25 April the battalion raided two enemy strongpoints, bringing back prisoners. The battalion was then relieved and went back into the brigade support trenches around Ypres itself, with Battalion HQ on the ramparts. Over the following weeks 26th RF alternated between the outpost line, brigade reserve line, and the camps in the rear, where it worked on. the Corps 'Green Line'. The sector was quiet apart from regular German shelling with Mustard gas,

In early June 41st Division moved to the Second Army Training Area at Wulverdinghe, where the training included open warfare. On 26 June 26th RF moved to Oudezeele, where 41st Division went into reserve for XIV French Corps and then relieved a French division in the front line at the Scherpenberg. Following the fighting in April, the positions were no more than shallow rifle pits that were not linked up and were overlooked from Mont Kemmel, the high point of the recent German advance. German artillery was fairly active against these positions and there were a few casualties. 27th US Division of the American Expeditionary Forces (AEF) was attached to Second Army for training, and Headquarters and D Company of 1st Battalion, 106th US Infantry Regiment, joined 26th RF on 25 July, first with two American soldiers attached to each British section, then one American platoon with each Fusilier company, and finally the American company relieving B Company in the support line. The process was then repeated with C Company 1/106th, until the end of July, when 1/106th relieved 26th RF. 26th RF then spent August rotating between the front line, training, and working parties.

=== Hundred Days Offensive ===
The Allies had launched their counter-offensive further south with the Battle of Amiens on 8 August. On the evening of 30 August the Germans were seen to be shelling their own line, and it was suspected that they had withdrawn. 26th RF sent forward patrols that found the top of Mont Kemmel unoccupied. The battalion moved up onto the hill by 08.20 and its patrols pushed on, finally making contact with the enemy some way beyond. Another division then took up the pursuit on 1 September, and 26th RF went back to billets in Dickebusch. However, it was back in the line on 4 September, covering the whole brigade front, and over the following days it probed forwards, occupying successive lines of old trenches until 7/8 September. It went back into brigade reserve at Dickebusch Lake on 9 September, and then on 15 September went by rail to billets in Audenfort to train for the next operation.

The Allies launched a coordinated series of offensives on 26–29 September. Second Army's attack (the Fifth Battle of Ypres) began on 28 September. 26th RF moved train to 'Toronto Camp' the day before, and marched up to the brigade assembly point at 'Swan Chateau' to await orders. It formed up behind Mount Sorrel at 13.00. Zero for 124th Bde was at 15.00, 26th RF advancing on its left alongside 10th Queen's, with two companies in front and two in support. There was no artillery barrage for this surprise attack and the battalion met little opposition from machine guns and snipers, which were outflanked. The advance continued by 500 yards (460 m) bounds until 'Green Jacket Ridge', about 3,000 yards (2,700 m) ahead, where the battalion came under heavy fire as it crested the ridge. The enemy began a counter-attack from 'Dumbarton Wood' against D Company, but the company charged down the slope with the bayonet and broke up the counter-attack before it developed, taking prisoners. The battalion crossed the Basseville stream and at 18.30 reached the final objective at Koortewilde, 4,000 yards (3,700 m) from the start line. The battalion rested on this line overnight, D Company forming a flank guard. The battalion's casualties had been light, 3 killed, 19 wounded, 3 missing (believed wounded) and 1 sick. The advance was resumed an hour after dawn on the following morning, with B and C Companies passing through and taking the lead. They suffered casualties from rifle and machine gun fire but reached their objective, the road running north-east from Houthem on the Comines Canal. 123rd Brigade then passed through and tried to continue the advance towards the River Lys but was driven back. So on 30 September 10th Queen's passed through, followed by 26th RF, and advancing rapidly despite their open flanks they reached the bank of the Lys by 10.00, taking prisoners including a complete machine gun team surrounded at Schoonveld Farm. 124th Brigade consolidated along the railway, with outposts along the riverbank, pursuing the retreating enemy with Lewis gun fire. The battalion's casualties were 2 killed, 7 wounded, 1 missing (believed wounded) and 1 sick. The brigade was relieved next day and went into divisional reserve. An enemy counter-attack at dusk on 2 October led to 26th RF being ordered to deploy on the forward slope facing Geluwe, but the attack was repulsed. The battalion deployed on the slope again all day on 3 October, but no further counter-attack materialised. 26th RF took over the front line until 7/8 October, when it went by road and train to Abeele. Casualties in the first week of October came to 7 killed, 29 wounded, 1 missing (believed wounded) and 9 sick.

The battalion returned to the front for the Battle of Courtrai on 14 October. 26th RF was in position on its jumping-off tapes by 04.00. It was to attack with two companies of 10th Queen's and a two-gun section of field guns attached. When the British barrage came down at Zero (05.25), the Germans retaliated with a heavy two-hour bombardment. However, 26th RF had moved off smartly, and was already passing through 122nd Brigade in the line, so most of the barrage fell behind it. The morning was misty and combined with the smoke from the barrage, the attacking battalions lost direction, the officers having to lead by compass bearing. When the fog lifted the three battalions of 124th Brigade were found to be considerably mixed up and came under close-range fire from defended farms and pillboxes. A German artillery battery attempted to limber up and gallop away, but was put out of action by Lewis gun fire and the two field guns operating in close support of 26th RF, and was captured. The battalion reorganised, moved on, and took Wijnberg where it paused to reorganise. A counter-attack threw it out again, but the men rallied on B Company and retook the village. The position was consolidated by 16.00 and next day A and D Companies sent patrols down towards the River Lys. One patrol penetrated Wevelgem on the river bank, but suffered heavy casualties. However, 26th RF did establish outposts closer to the river before being relieved. In 24 hours the battalion had captured about 200 prisoners, 15 field guns, and numerous machine guns and horses, for the loss of only 78 casualties.

41st Division attacked again on 21 October to close up to the River Scheldt east of the Courtrai-Le Bossuyt Canal. 124th Brigade attacked at 07.30 with 10th Queen's leading on the left, reaching the Laatse Oortie–Hoogstraatje ridge about 11.00. At this point the Queen's were to turn half left and seize the canal crossing, then advance with the canal on their right while 26th RF moved up to take their place and continue the advance to the Scheldt. But a tunnel where the railway crossed the canal had been strongly wired and was held by a machine gun battalion. It could not be passed, while 26th RF were also caught by heavy artillery and machine guns. All further movement was impossible for the rest of the day, and another attempt that night by D Company was stopped by wire and machine guns. Patrols found the enemy very alert and able to maintain their defences. 26th RF was relieved on the night of 23 October, and then made another attack on the other side of the canal on 25 October, when there was a general advance towards the Scheldt, covered by a barrage. 26th RF had no better success, being held up east of Ooteghem by a heavy barrage and intense machine gun fire. Two platoons attempted to enter the village but were driven back, though the windmill was rushed and captured. Lieutenant-Col Robinson was wounded while reorganising the battalion and Capt A. Spottiswood took over command of the operation. Later Maj Etchells resumed acting command, subsequently being promoted to the permanent command. The battalion dug in for the night and next day sent forward fighting patrols who found that the enemy had retired. However the battalion was relieved before they reached the Scheldt. Although it followed the final pursuit from 2 November, 26th RF saw no further action. It was north of Renaix when the Armistice with Germany came into force on 11 November.

=== Post-Armistice ===
On 18 November 41st Division learned that it had been selected as one of the British divisions to form part of the occupation forces in Germany. 26th RF moved up to Bievene on 20 November, where it spent the following weeks cleaning up and training (especially route marches) in preparation for resuming the advance. The march to the Rhine began on 13 December, resting at Waterloo on the way. From 20 December the battalion trained at Huy, then on 6 January 1919 it entrained for the last part of its journey, crossing into Germany and detraining at Bensberg in the suburbs of Cologne. It then marched to Ehreshoven, where it was stationed to carry out its duties in the Cologne bridgehead. Demobilisation got under way in January 1919, when the first men left for home; others signed on for an additional year's service.

The British occupation force was designated British Army of the Rhine in March, when 41st Division was redesignated 'London Division' and 124th Bde became '3rd London Brigade'. 26th RF remained in the brigade, now joined by 17th RF (Empire) and 23rd RF (1st Sportsmen's). The battalion was now stationed at Köln-Kalk. As men were progressively demobilised, 53rd (Service) Battalion, Royal Fusiliers (a former Young Soldier training battalion) arrived from England and was absorbed into 26th RF on 2 April, maintaining the battalion at full strength. Command of the battalion changed frequently, Lt-Col Robinson returning briefly before he was demobilised, then Maj W.W. Chard from 1st RF, and Lt-Col C.J. Hickie. The battalion continued guard duties and training at various locations in the bridgehead. In August D Company was sent to carry out guard duties at Antwerp. London Division was broken up in November 1919, the remaining men of the battalion returning to England where 26th (Service) Battalion, Royal Fusiliers (Bankers') was disbanded at Grantham on 27 March 1920.

== Memorials ==
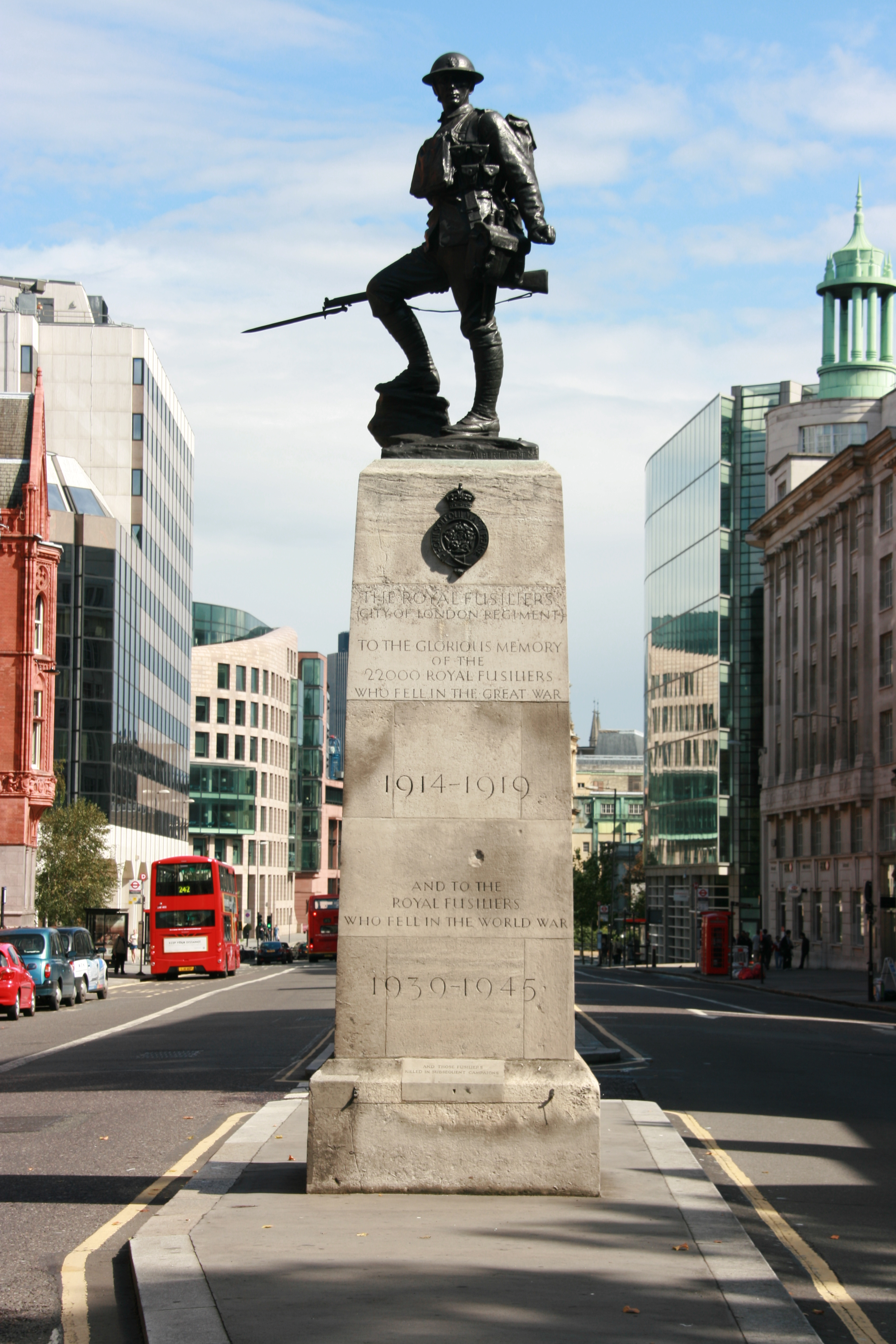
Royal Fusiliers War Memorial on High Holborn.

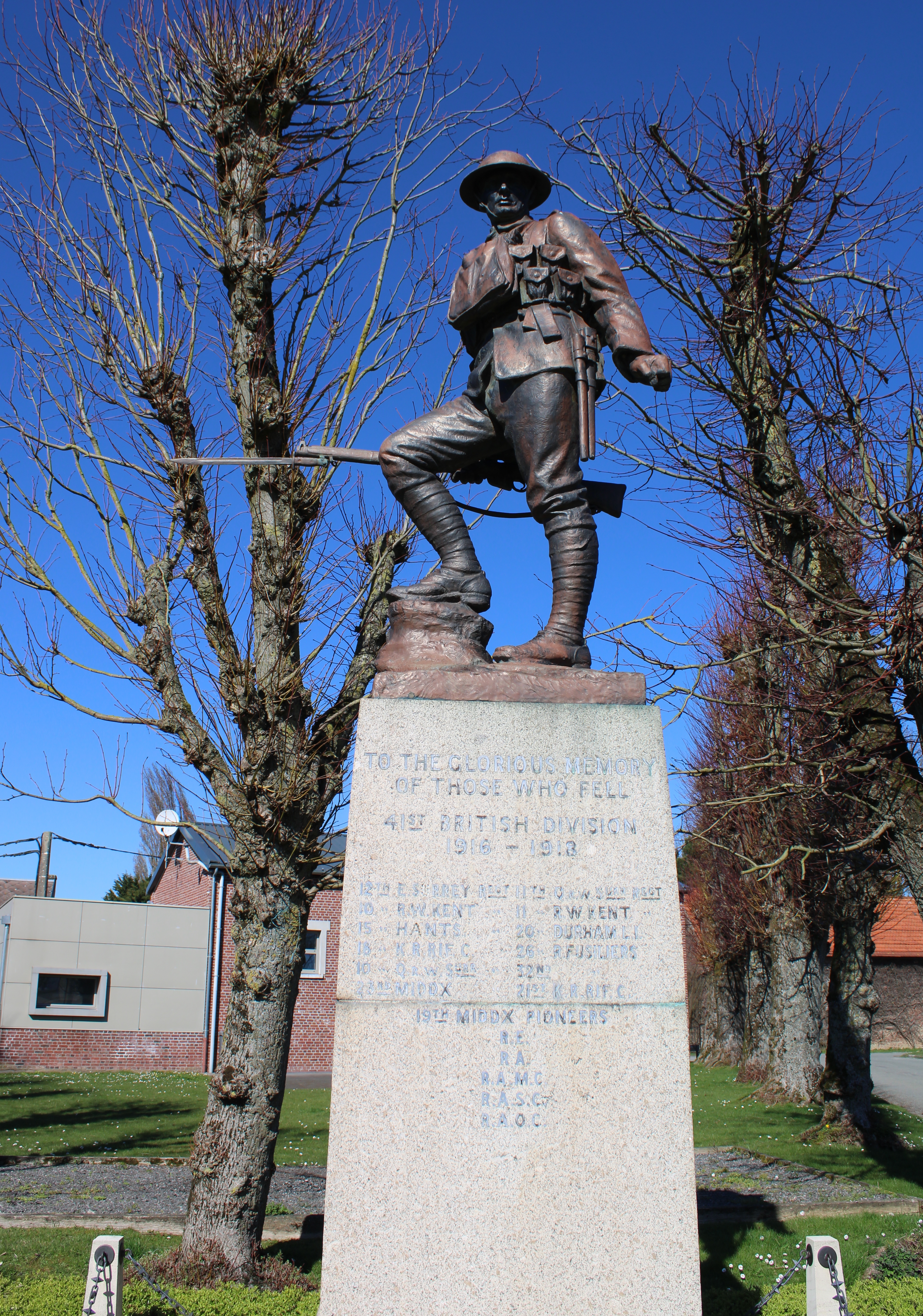
41st Division's memorial at Flers.

There is a stained glass memorial window to the 26th (Service) Bn, Royal Fusiliers (Bankers) in the church of St Edmund, King and Martyr, in Lombard Street in the traditional financial district of the City of London. The window depicts St George in full armour, surrounded by coats of arms of banks and City institutions.

The Royal Fusiliers War Memorial, with its bronze figure of a Fusilier sculpted by Albert Toft, stands at Holborn Bar on the boundary of the City of London. A panel on the back of the pedestal lists all the RF battalions. The figure on the 41st Division memorial at Flers is an exact copy of Toft's Fusilier memorial, even though only two RF battalions served in the division.

== Insignia ==
The 26th Bn wore the Royal Fusiliers' badge (a Tudor rose on a 'bomb') on cloth service caps, and probably the brass 'R.F.' title on shoulder straps. During training the battalion had worn a yellow band on the shoulder straps. Battalions in 41st Division generally wore no special signs, however 26th RF may have worn a yellow half circle for a short time. (Another unit in 124th Bde wore a symbol in the brigade colour of yellow on the back beneath the collar from late July until mid-September 1917.)

41st Division's sign was a white diagonal stripe across a coloured square, which was yellow in the case of 124th Brigade. This was not worn on the uniform but only on vehicles and signboards. Battalion transport vehicles carried a numeral on a background of brigade colour; as the second battalion in the brigade, 26th RF's numeral would have been '2'.
