= Canton of Dainville =

Coordinates: 50°19′13″N 2°43′20″E

Dainville
- Former canton
- Interactive map of Dainville
- Country: France
- Region: Hauts-de-France
- Department: Pas-de-Calais
- No. of communes: {{{nbcomm}}}
- Disbanded: 2015
- Area: 75.14 km^{2} (29.01 sq mi)
- Population (2012): 18,803
  - Density: 250.2/km^{2} (648.1/sq mi)

The Canton of Dainville is a former canton situated in the department of the Pas-de-Calais and in the Nord-Pas-de-Calais region of northern France. It was disbanded following the French canton reorganisation which came into effect in March 2015. It had a total of 18,803 inhabitants (2012).

== Geography ==
The canton is organised around Dainville in the arrondissement of Arras. The altitude varies from 53m (Sainte-Catherine) to 145m (Acq) for an average altitude of 88m.

The canton comprised 10 communes:

- Acq
- Anzin-Saint-Aubin
- Dainville
- Duisans
- Écurie
- Étrun
- Marœuil
- Mont-Saint-Éloi
- Roclincourt
- Sainte-Catherine-lès-Arras

== Population ==
Population Evolution
1962	1968	1975	1982	1990	1999
9421	11061	13928	16188	17504	17370
Census count starting from 1962 : Population without double counting

== See also ==
- Cantons of Pas-de-Calais
- Communes of Pas-de-Calais
- Arrondissements of the Pas-de-Calais department
