= Battle of Arras (1940) =

Battle during World War II

- Part of the Battle of France in the Second World War
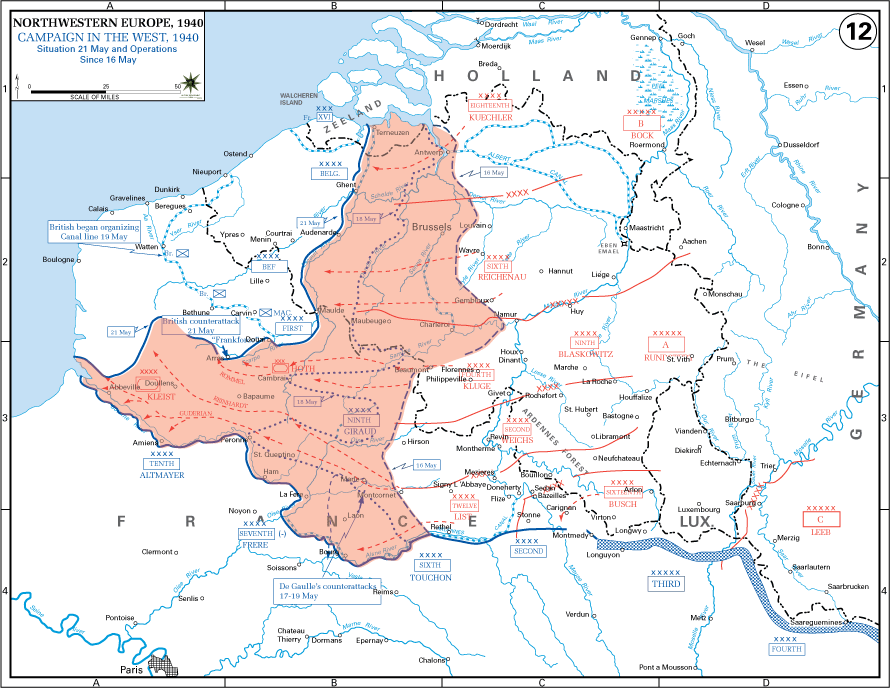
- Situation in France, 21 May 1940. The counter-attack near Arras is seen the centre-left of the image.
Date	21 May 1940
Location	Arras, France 50°15′N 2°42′E
Result	German victory

Belligerents
United Kingdom; France	Germany

Commanders and leaders
Harold Franklyn	Erwin Rommel

Units involved
3e Division Légère Mécanique; 5th Infantry Division; 50th Motor Division; 1st Army Tank Brigade	SS Division Totenkopf; 5th Panzer Division; 7th Panzer Division

Strength
88 tanks (Frankforce); 15,000 infantry	c. 225 tanks; 5,000–10,000 infantry

Casualties and losses
60 tanks lost (2 Matilda II); c. 500 British killed, wounded and captured	350 killed or wounded; 400 PoW; 7th Panzer Division lost 37 tanks
- 80 Allied prisoners were murdered in the Wormhoudt massacre, by members of II Battalion, SS Infanterie-Regiment Leibstandarte SS Adolf Hitler
- Arras, capital of the Pas-de-Calais, department of Nord-Pas-de-Calais

The Battle of Arras took place on 21 May 1940, during the Battle of France in the Second World War. Following the German invasion of the Low Countries on 10 May, French and British forces advanced into Belgium. The German campaign plan Fall Gelb (Case Yellow) had evolved into a decoy operation in the Netherlands and Belgium, with the main effort through the Ardennes. German units crossed the Meuse without waiting for reinforcements at the Battle of Sedan. Instead of consolidating bridgeheads on the west bank of the Meuse, the Germans began an advance down the Somme river valley towards the English Channel.

The Allies were thrown into confusion and their attempts to cut off the panzer spearheads degenerated into sporadic, un-coordinated counter-attacks which never achieved sufficient concentration to succeed as the main Allied armies were in Belgium. The offensive at Arras was planned by the British and French to relieve the pressure on the British garrison in the town of Arras and was not coordinated with an attack by the French from the south of the German panzer corridor.

Constrained by the limited forces available to them, the Anglo-French offensive was carried out by a small mixed force of British and French tanks and infantry who advanced south from Arras. The Allies made some early gains and panicked a number of German units but after an advance of up to 6.2 mi (10 km), they were forced to withdraw after dark to avoid encirclement. The attack was a failure but had a disproportionate effect on Hitler and Oberkommando der Wehrmacht (OKW, German armed forces high command).

Concern about more Anglo-French counter-attacks against the panzer corridor before non-motorised German infantry divisions caught up led Hitler to order the panzer advance to stop until the situation at Arras had been restored. The Allies used the pause to reinforce the Channel Ports, prevent their rapid capture and fortify the western approaches to Dunkirk before the Germans arrived, making the evacuation of the British and French forces in Operation Dynamo possible.

== Background ==
Army Group A (Generaloberst Gerd von Rundstedt) defeated the French at the Battle of Sedan from 12 to 15 May and crossed the Meuse. A French counter-attack at the Battle of Montcornet on 17 May by the 4e Division Cuirassée (4e DCr, Colonel Charles de Gaulle), from Montcornet to the south, was defeated by an improvised defence and the 10th Panzer Division, which was rushed forward on the French flank. The German counter-attacks were supported by Fliegerkorps VIII (Generaloberst Wolfram von Richthofen) and the French lost 32 tanks and armoured vehicles. On 19 May, after receiving reinforcements, the 4e DCr attacked again and was repulsed with the loss of 80 of 155 of its vehicles, much of the loss being caused by the aircraft of Fliegerkorps VIII, which attacked French units as they massed to attack the flanks of German units. By the end of the Battle of Montcornet, much of the French Ninth Army on the Meuse had disintegrated under the attacks of Fliegerkorps VIII.

German spearheads broke through the Peronne–Cambrai gap and threatened Boulogne and Calais, cutting the lines of communication of the Allied armies of Groupe d'armées 1 (General Gaston Billotte) in the North-East Theatre of Operations (Général d'armée Alphonse Joseph Georges), separating them from the main French armies south of the Somme. On 19 May, General Edmund Ironside, the British Chief of the Imperial General Staff, conferred with Lord Gort, commander of the BEF, at his headquarters near Lens and urged Gort to save the BEF, by attacking towards Amiens to the south-west but Gort had only two divisions available for an attack. Ironside met Billotte, finding him apparently incapable of taking action. Ironside returned to Britain and ordered urgent anti-invasion measures.

On the morning of 20 May, General Maurice Gamelin, the Commander-in-chief of the French armed forces, ordered the armies trapped in Belgium and northern France to fight their way south, to link up with French forces attacking northwards from the Somme river. On the evening of 19 May, the French Prime Minister Paul Reynaud had sacked Gamelin and replaced him with General Maxime Weygand. Weygand cancelled the orders and after a delay, ordered a similar counter-offensive from the north and south against the German "corridor", to break the encircled armies out of the pocket. In the north the British combined their available divisions with the 50th Infantry Division, which was holding the Vimy area, to create a contingent which was code-named Frankforce. Frankforce was to hold the line of the river Scarpe to the east of Arras with the 5th Infantry Division, while the rest of the force attacked to the south of Arras and the new French Groupe d'Armées 3 (Général d'armée Antoine-Marie-Benoît Besson) attacked north from the Somme.

King Leopold III of Belgium told Gort that he did not expect the BEF to risk itself to keep contact with the Belgian army, but warned the British that if they persisted with the southern offensive, the Belgians would be overstretched and collapse. Leopold suggested that the Allies should establish a beachhead covering Dunkirk and the Belgian channel ports instead. The BEF reinforced Arras despite Gort having doubts about the French plan. (Billotte took part in a meeting in Ypres from 19 to 21 May. Driving back after this meeting, he had a road accident. Billotte fell into a coma and died soon afterwards, leaving the Allied Groupe d'Armées 1 (1st Army Group) leaderless for three days; around that time, the British decided to evacuate from the Channel ports.

== Prelude ==
=== German advance ===
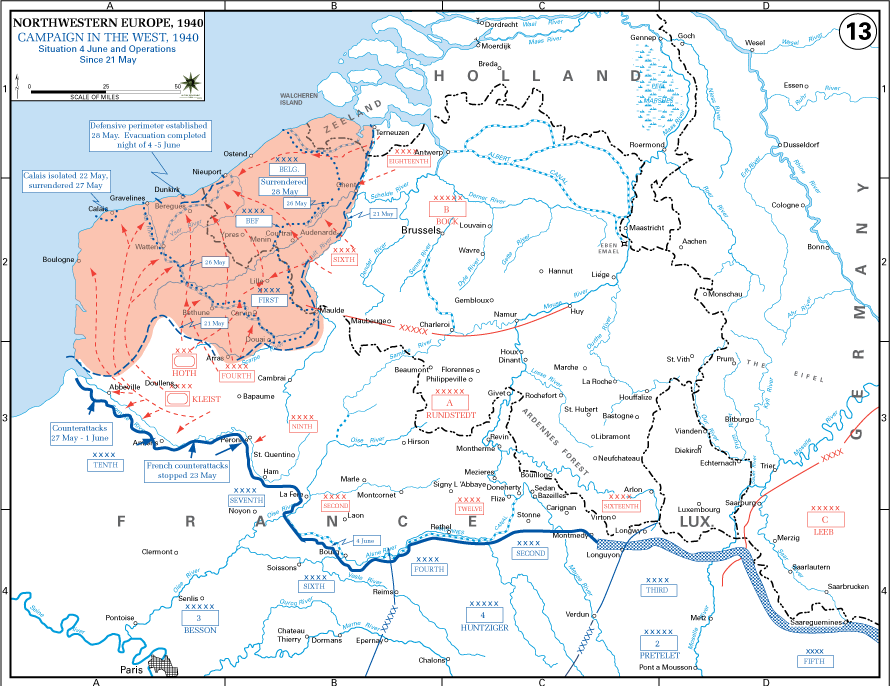
Situation on 4 June 1940 and actions since 21 May

The 7th Panzer Division had started the campaign on 10 May 1940 with 34 Panzer Is, 68 Panzer IIs, 91 Panzer 38(t)s and 24 Panzer IVs. Losses of vehicles had been light. The division had no Panzer IIIs, which was Germany's principal tank for engaging enemy tanks. The bulk of its medium tanks were of Czech design and none of its tanks could match the armour of the British Matilda II. The 7th Panzer Division had captured Cambrai and advanced to the area south of Arras. For 21 May, the division was ordered to wheel west around Arras and attack to the north, capturing crossings over the Scarpe at Acq, a risky manoeuvre since the right flank would be vulnerable to a counter-attack from Arras.

The 5th Panzer Division (Lieutenant-General Max von Hartlieb-Walsporn) was to attack so as to relieve pressure on the 7th Panzer Division (the division was delayed and never managed to fulfil its orders). Rommel ordered Panzer-Regiment 25 to probe towards Acq 6.2 mi (10 km) forward with two motorised infantry regiments to follow later, which left most of the division without tanks. Rommel led the advance but returned around 4:00 p.m. when the infantry failed to arrive and at the positions of Schützen-Regiment 7 (Fusilier or Rifle Regiment), found himself under attack by tanks and infantry.

=== Allied preparations ===
Georges ordered General d'Astier de la Vigerie, commander of Zone d'Opérations Aériennes Nord of the armée de l'Air to support the British attack but sent no details of the attack front, no targets and no zero hour for the attack. D'Astier was also unable to contact the First Army headquarters or the HQ of the Air Component RAF of the BEF, which was out of action, as it was moving back to bases in England. French reconnaissance aircraft were shot down or chased away until 4:00 p.m., when aircraft got through to Arras and found no activity around Cambrai. Major-General Harold Franklyn, commander of the British 5th Infantry Division was put in charge of Frankforce, improvised from his division, the 50th (Northumbrian) Motor Division (Major-General Giffard Martel) and the 74 tanks of the 1st Army Tank Brigade. Frankforce had moved to the vicinity of Vimy, north of Arras to reinforce the Allied garrison at Arras, for a counter-attack to the south, to cut German communications in the vicinity. Franklyn had detached a brigade each from the 5th Infantry Division and the 50th Motor Division, which had only two instead of the usual three brigades each. Franklyn was not aware of a French push northwards toward Cambrai and the French were ignorant of a British attack south toward Arras.

Franklyn had support from the French Corps de Cavalerie (Lieutenant-General René Prioux) of the French First Army, which had fought at the Battle of Hannut (12–14 May) with its SOMUA S35 cavalry tanks. Many of the tanks of the 1ère Division Légère Mécanique (1ère DLM) had been destroyed in the earlier battles and the rest had been distributed among infantry divisions and could not be reassembled in time, despite threats to court-martial officers who refused to release the tanks. By 21 May, Prioux could only contribute a few tanks of the 3ième Division Légère Mécanique (3e DLM). The attack had been intended to be made by two French and two British infantry divisions but Frankforce comprised only about 15,000 men, after the detachment of brigades to the defence of Arras, the river to the east and into reserve. The defensive deployments left only the 6th and 8th battalions of the Durham Light Infantry (DLI), of 151st Brigade and one in reserve as well as the 13th Infantry Brigade, supporting the 4th Royal Tank Regiment (4th RTR) and the 7th Royal Tank Regiment (7th RTR), a force of about 2,000 men and 74 tanks. The tanks were 58 Matilda Is, thickly armoured but equipped only with a machine gun and 16 Matilda II tanks, very well armoured and carrying a 2-pounder gun and a machine-gun.

=== Allied plan ===
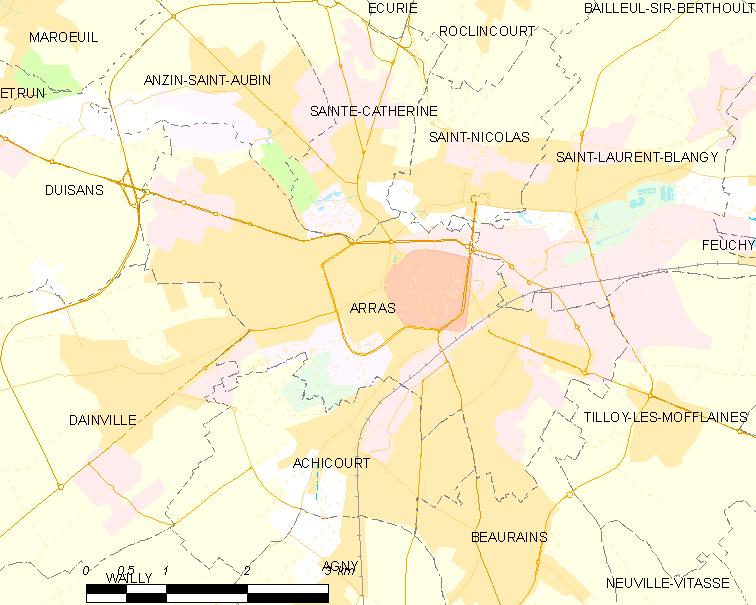
Modern map of Arras (commune FR insee code 62041

The original instructions given to Franklyn had been to plan a limited attack south of Arras, to relieve the garrison. Changes made by Ironside for a more ambitious combined attack with the French, were not communicated to Franklyn, who used most of Frankforce defensively, to reinforce Arras and relieve the French Cavalry Corps to the east of the town. Martel was ordered to plan an attack to

... clear and capture the area south of the River Scarpe from inclusive southern outskirts of Arras including Pelves and Monchy thence line of Cojeul river as far as Arras–Bapaume.

— Ellis

an area of over 40 sq mi (100 km^{2}). A force based on the 151st Infantry Brigade (Brigadier J. A. Churchill), was to advance from the west of Arras and move round to the Cojeul River; the 13th Infantry Brigade (Brigadier M. C. Dempsey) of the 5th Infantry Division was then to cross the river and advance southwards from the east side of Arras, to meet the 151st Infantry Brigade. A Right Column of the 7th RTR, 8th DLI, 365th Battery, 92nd Field Regiment RA, 260th Battery, 65th (Norfolk Yeomanry) Anti-Tank Regiment RA, a platoon of the 151st Brigade Anti-Tank Company and a motor-cycle scout platoon of the 4th Battalion, Northumberland Fusiliers and a Left Column of the 4th RTR, 6th DLI, 368th Battery, 92nd Field Regiment RA, 206th Battery, 52nd Anti-Tank Regiment RA, a platoon of the 151st Brigade Anti-Tank Company, one company and a scout platoon of the 4th Northumberland Fusiliers, were to cross the Arras–Doullens road at 2:00 p.m., which meant that the infantry would have to make an 8 mi (13 km) approach march to reach the jumping-off point, over roads filled with traffic and refugees.

== Battle ==
=== 3e DLM ===
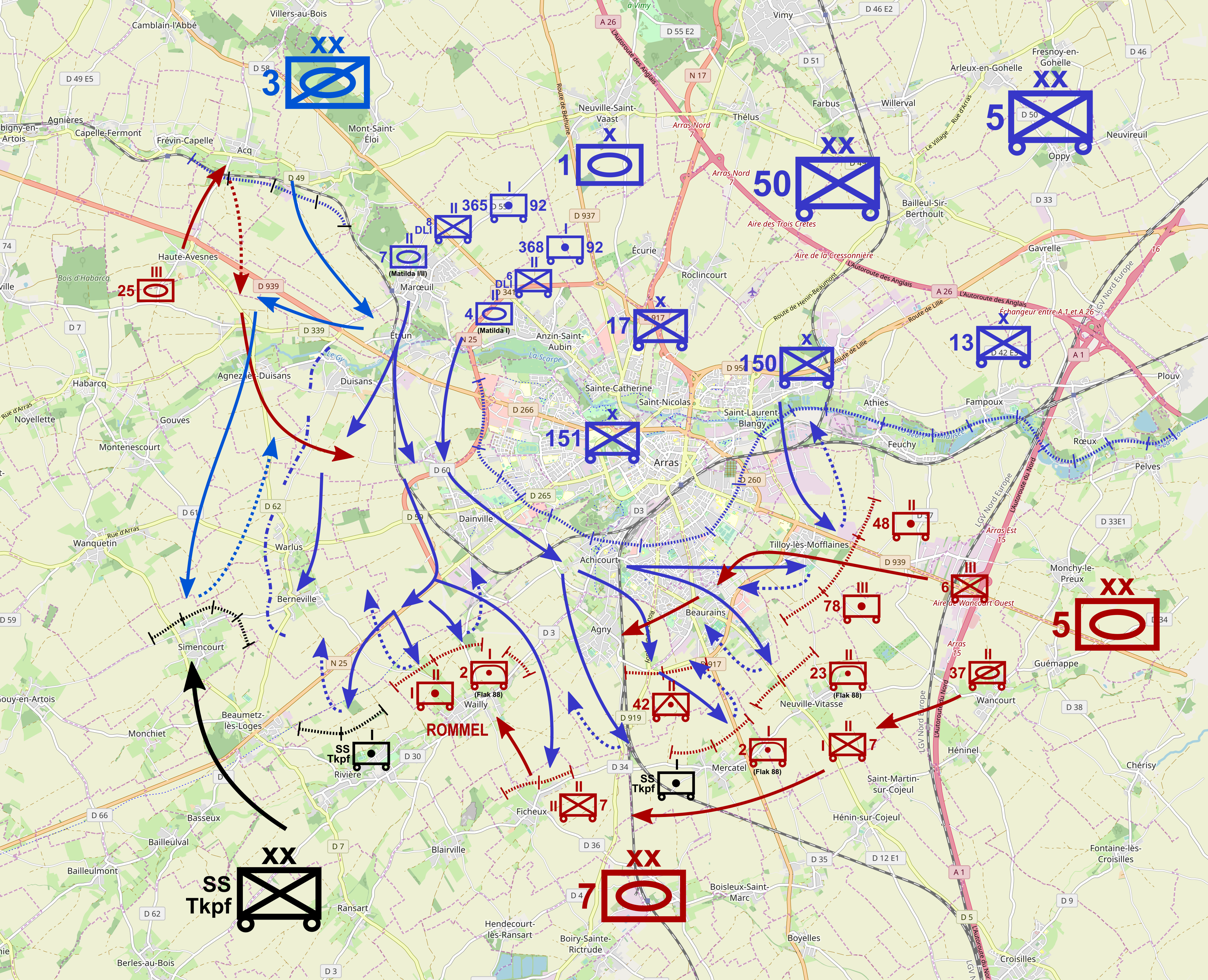
Battle of Arras: French in blue, British in dark blue, German Army in red, SS in black

An advance by the 3e DLM, to screen the right flank of the British force was also poorly prepared with insufficient liaison, the French not being told of the timing and direction of the British attack. In the confusion an exchange of fire occurred between the French SOMUA S35s and British anti-tank guns near Warlus. An anti-tank gun was knocked out, British soldiers were killed and several French tanks hit before the mistake was discovered. During the evening, the French force, with about six SOMUAs, engaged Panzer-Regiment 25 south of Duisans. British troops were retreating and by the time the German tanks broke through, the British had escaped.

=== Right Column ===
The time taken by the infantry to reach the assembly points for the attack, through the refugee traffic on the roads, left little time to study their orders or reconnoitre. Marœuil was being bombarded when the 50th (Northumbrian) Motor Division began the advance. The Right Column advanced at 2:30 p.m. and received small-arms fire from a wood. The column had to fight through Duisans, which was occupied by German infantry. French tanks on the right reported tanks of Panzer-Regiment 25 of the 7th Panzer Division to the west. Two companies of the 8th DLI and two troops of the 260th Anti-Tank Battery were left to garrison the village and then the depleted column captured Warlus against stronger opposition and had to leave another garrison behind. Berneville to the south was also captured and a party of the 7th RTR and 8th DLI pressed on to the Arras–Doullens road, where they met part of Schützen-Regiment 7 and troops of the SS-Totenkopf Division.

The British were forced under cover by machine-gun and mortar fire and the Luftwaffe attacked the Right Column for twenty minutes. Junkers Ju 87 Stukas belonging to I, and III Gruppen, Sturzkampfgeschwader 2 dive-bombed British forces at Arras. I Gruppe Sturzkampfgeschwader 77 is known to have bombed infantry positions north of Arras. The tanks kept going and then reached Wailly, where they met troops of the Totenkopf Division. The advanced guard suffered many casualties, retreated to Warlus and German tanks counter-attacked at Warlus and Duisans. The German attacks were repulsed but managed to cut the road between the villages and the Right Column was unable to advance further.

=== Left Column ===
The Left Column also met resistance as soon as it advanced and fought its way through Schützen-Regiment 6 at Dainville. Another 2 mi (3.2 km) further on at Achicourt, six Matildas overran a line of anti-tank guns and then the column kept going to Agny and Beaurains, before a party reached Wancourt on the Cojeul. Infantry garrisoned Agny and Beaurains and the 4th RTR repulsed German counter-attacks by tanks and Schützen-Regiment 7, on the right flank of the 7th Panzer Division; the British then took ground south of Beaurains. Fighting went on all afternoon between Mercatel and Tilloy, where the tanks ran into a line of anti-aircraft guns and artillery, including 88 mm Flak guns and many of the tanks were knocked out. Individual tanks kept going but there were no reserves to consolidate and exploit the success and the advance was stopped in mutually-costly fighting. To the east of Arras, the 150th Infantry Brigade attacked across the Scarpe towards Tilloy and the 13th Infantry Brigade captured a bridgehead further east, ready for the second phase of the attack by Frankforce.

=== 7th Panzer Division ===
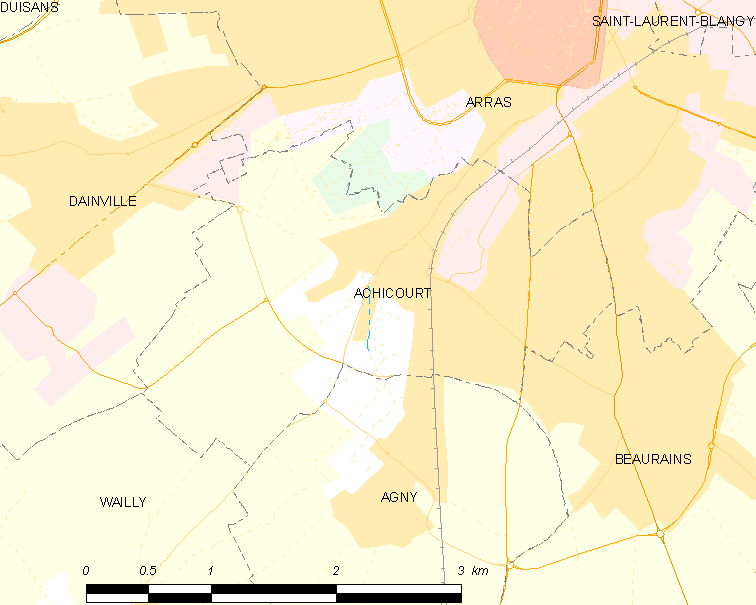
Modern map of Agny and vicinity (commune FR insee code 62004)

Schützen-Regiment 6 was attacked while advancing towards Agny by a British column advancing from Dainville, which knocked out several vehicles; more British tanks attacked from the north and caught the regimental convoys strung out along the road on their right flank. Panzerjägerabteilung 42 (42nd Anti-Tank Battalion) was rushed up to the area between Agny and Beaurains, but was overrun by the British tanks. After breaking through Schützen-Regiment 6, they attacked the transport of Schützen-Regiment 7 between Mercatel and Ficheux and then pressed on, throwing the motorised Totenkopf Division into confusion and almost overrunning its headquarters. When the British tanks broke through the German anti-tank screen, the infantry stood their ground, encouraged by Rommel, even after the British tanks had rolled over their anti-tank guns.

At around 4:00 p.m. (German time) II Battalion, Schützen-Regiment 7 was attacked by about 40 British tanks, which were engaged by artillery on Hill 111, roughly 0.62 mi (1 km) north-west of Wailly. German 88 mm FlaK guns knocked out several Matilda I tanks. Some larger Matilda II tanks among the Matilda Is advanced through the artillery and anti-tank fire unscathed, German shells bouncing off their armour. The tanks destroyed the German anti-tank guns with return fire and rolled over them, killing the crews. The British tanks were eventually stopped short of Hill 111 by fire from another artillery battery but other tanks bypassed the area on both sides. On the southern flank of the 7th Panzer Division, the Totenkopf Division was attacked and some SS troops fled in panic.

=== Allied retirement ===
The maximum depth of the British advance was 10 mi (16 km); 400 German prisoners had been taken, many tanks and much equipment had been destroyed but two Matilda IIs had been knocked out. Only 26 Matilda Is were still operational and both tank battalion commanders had been killed; during the evening, Franklyn ordered both columns to withdraw. French cavalry remained near Warlus, was surrounded during the night and only a few tanks managed to break out. The infantry of the Right Column in Warlus were rescued, because six French tanks arrived with two armoured infantry vehicles and broke out through the German position on the Warlus–Duisans road. The garrison in Duisans also retired after dark, in the Bren carriers of the 9th DLI, covered by the anti-tank guns of the brigade reserve in Marœuil. The Left Column troops in Agny and Beaurains were bombed and then attacked by tanks as they retreated, one party missing the road (and eventually reaching Boulogne). The 7th Panzer Division laagered overnight south of Dainville, with advanced parties of infantry close to the south bank of the Scarpe.

== Aftermath ==
=== Analysis ===
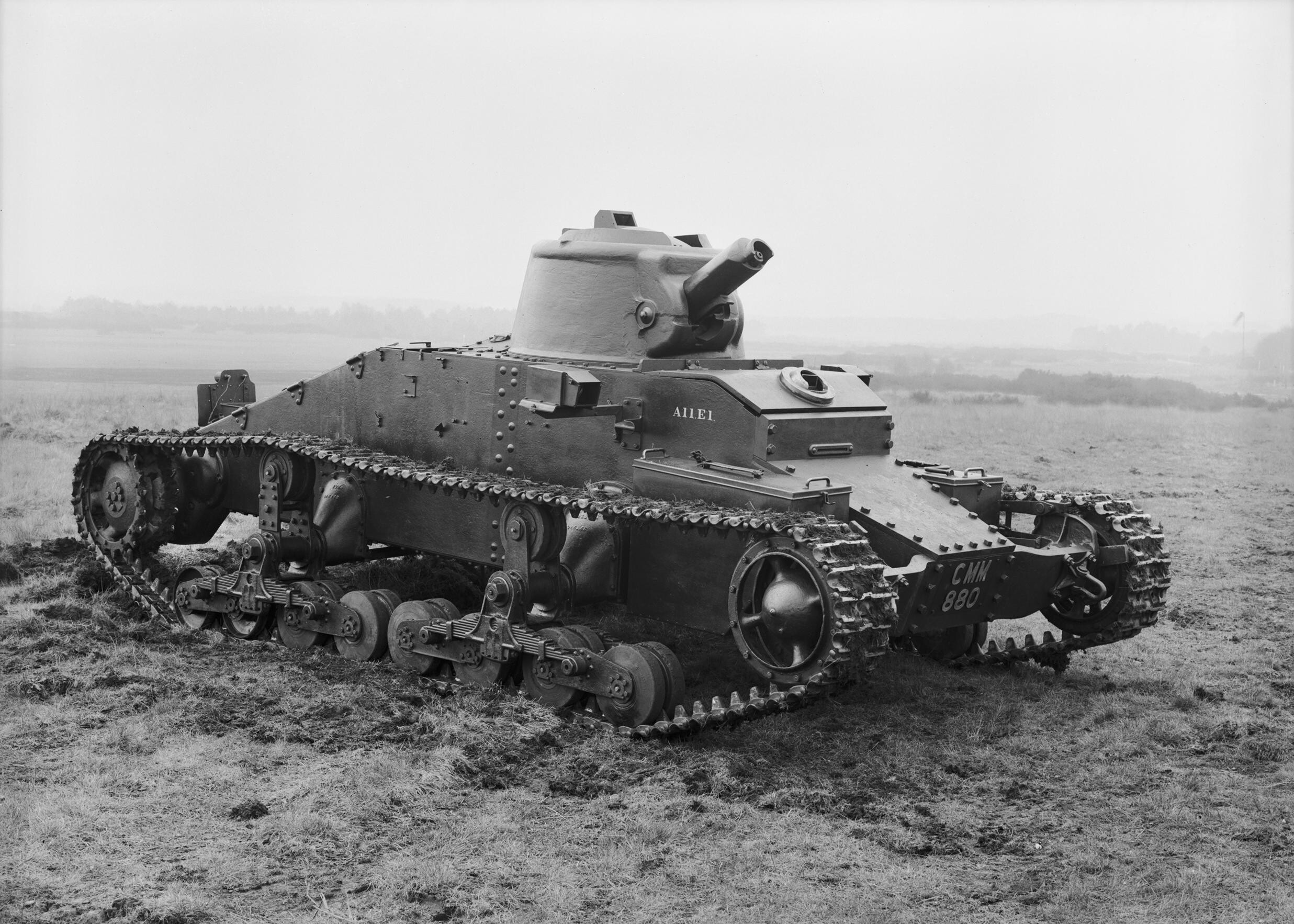
The Matilda I tank was armed with a machine-gun

In 1953, Lionel Ellis, the British official historian, wrote that the attack at Arras succeeded in easing German pressure round Arras and delaying the encirclement of the BEF. The ground between Arras and the Cojeul was re-occupied and there was no serious German attack on the town, Rommel making the alarmist claim that the attack was made by five divisions. Beyond the delay imposed on German moves and the many casualties inflicted on the Germans, the attack was bound to fail without a force sufficiently powerful to follow up and consolidate the captured ground. Rundstedt, the commander of Army Group A, had intended that the panzer divisions should rest after the exertions on 20 May. In 1978, Cooper wrote that the attack at Arras led to the German higher commanders to continue to attack northwards, to capture the channel ports.

Attacking to the south-west was rejected and OKH ordered Panzergruppe von Kleist to capture Boulogne and Calais, about 50 mi (80 km) away. Apprehension of another Allied attack caused Rundstedt to order Panzergruppe Hoth to remain in position. The XLI Corps (Reinhardt) sent a division eastwards as a precaution and Kleist diverted the 10th Panzer Division and parts of the 1st Panzer Division and the 2nd Panzer Division from XIX Corps (Guderian) to hold the bridgehead over the Somme, which slowed the advance to Dunkirk from the beginning. XIX Corps attacked again at 8:00 a.m. on 22 May but was still hampered by a "near paralysis" in the German command, Rundstedt ordering that the instructions from OKH were to be ignored and the advance on Boulogne and Calais would have to wait. At 12:40 p.m. Rundstedt countermanded his own order but for five hours, the panzers had waited on the Amache river.

In 2005, Frieser wrote that Allied planning was notable for its failure to cut the panzer corridor when there were insufficient German motorised divisions to consolidate behind the panzer divisions and the non-motorised divisions were several days' march away. The corridor was only 25 mi (40 km) wide at Arras and vulnerable to a pincer movement. The Allies could have achieved a Clausewitzian counter-encirclement and cut off the panzers on the channel coast. Halder had been willing to run the risk because of the incapacity of the Allies to achieve a fast tempo of operations. The Allied attack was contained because Rommel improvised a gun line of anti-tank guns and anti-aircraft guns, that managed to stop some of the lighter British tanks; the infantry tanks, particularly the Matilda IIs, proved very difficult to knock out with the standard 37 mm anti tank gun.

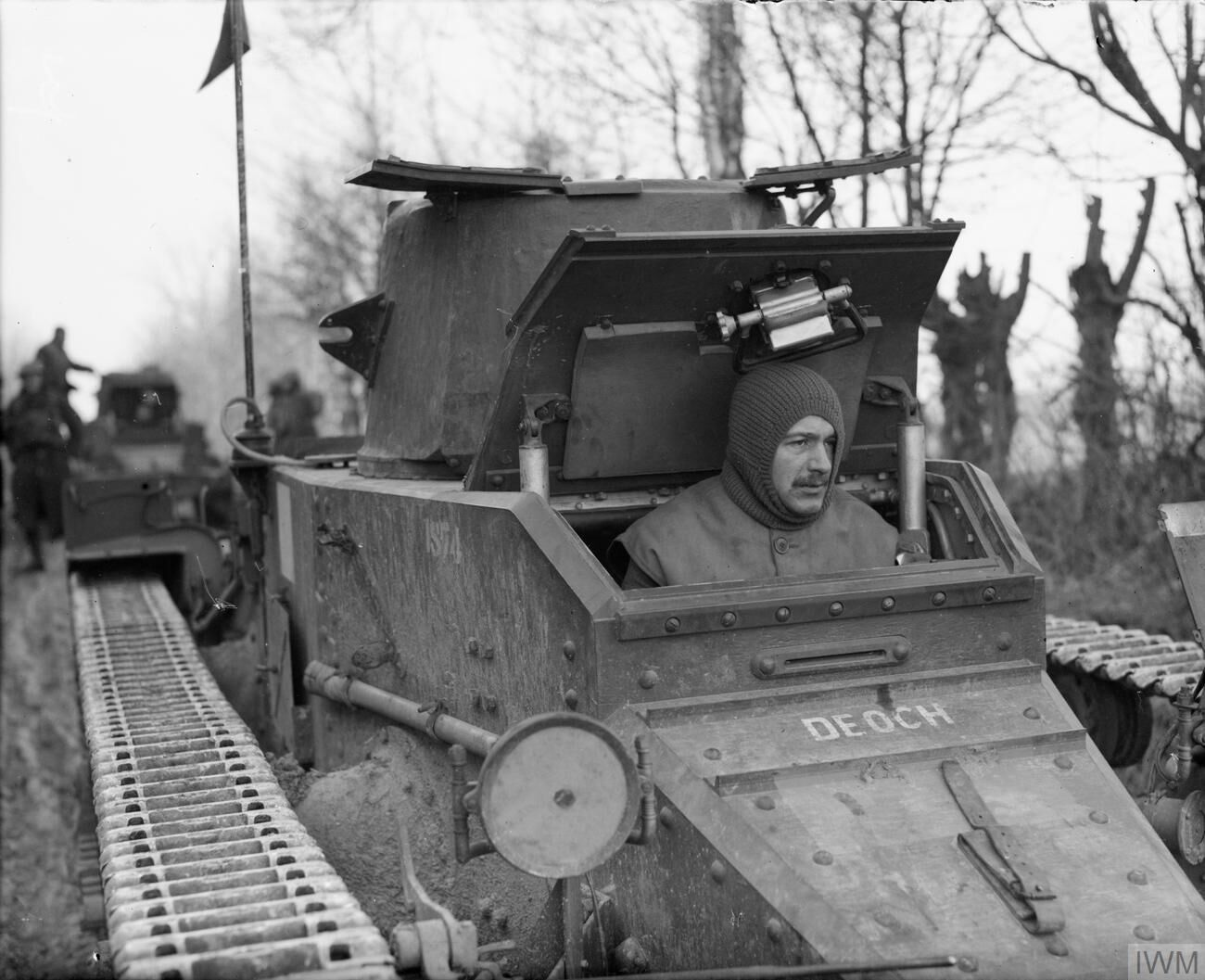
Matilda I in France, showing the cramped driver's compartment and the hatch obstructing the turret

Rommel also used wireless to order another gun line quickly to be set up with artillery and several 88 mm FlaK 36 anti-aircraft guns much further back, which knocked out 24 tanks in a few minutes on the flat ground between Mercatel and Tilloy. Just after 6:00 p.m., Junkers Ju 87 Stukas of Fliegerkorps I and VIII arrived and made 300 attacks on the retiring tanks by 8:30 p.m. Rommel ordered Panzer-Regiment 25 to return and cut off the British tanks but south of Duisans it met French tanks covering the British right flank and only pushed through after a long and costly engagement. When the German tanks had broken through a British anti-tank gun line, between Duisans and Warlus, the British tanks had already returned; the British attack had turned into a disaster and only 28 of the 88 tanks committed returned to their start line. The 6th Panzer Division signalled that "a strong enemy force was making a breakthrough" which caused alarm Panzergruppe Kleist. Kleist ordered the 6th Panzer Division and 8th Panzer Division eastwards to counter the Allied breakthrough. In the aftermath the Germans treated the Battle of Arras as a minor defeat for the Allies.

=== Casualties ===
Rommel noted in his diary that his division had lost 89 men killed, 116 wounded and 173 men missing and captured, as many as the first four days of operations, which included the Meuse crossing, although 90 of the missing returned to their units. In 1953, Lionel Ellis, the British official historian, quoted the 7th Panzer Division war diary, which recorded the loss of nine medium and several light tanks, 378 men killed or wounded and 173 missing; British records noted some 400 Germans taken prisoner. The British lost around 100 men killed or wounded in the attack, it is unknown how many French soldiers became casualties in the engagement. Frankforce lost sixty of the 88 tanks in the attack.

=== Subsequent operations ===
The main French attack on Cambrai took place on 22 May and like the attack on 21 May, the force involved was much smaller than intended. The Tenth Army commander, General Robert Altmayer, should have attacked with the V Corps and tanks of the Prioux Cavalry Corps but only an infantry regiment and two depleted tank battalions could be assembled in time. The panzer divisions had moved on, only small detachments having been left in Cambrai and the marching infantry divisions were not due until later in the day. The French attack reached the fringe of Cambrai only to be stopped by the Luftwaffe and forced to retreat.

=== Halt orders ===
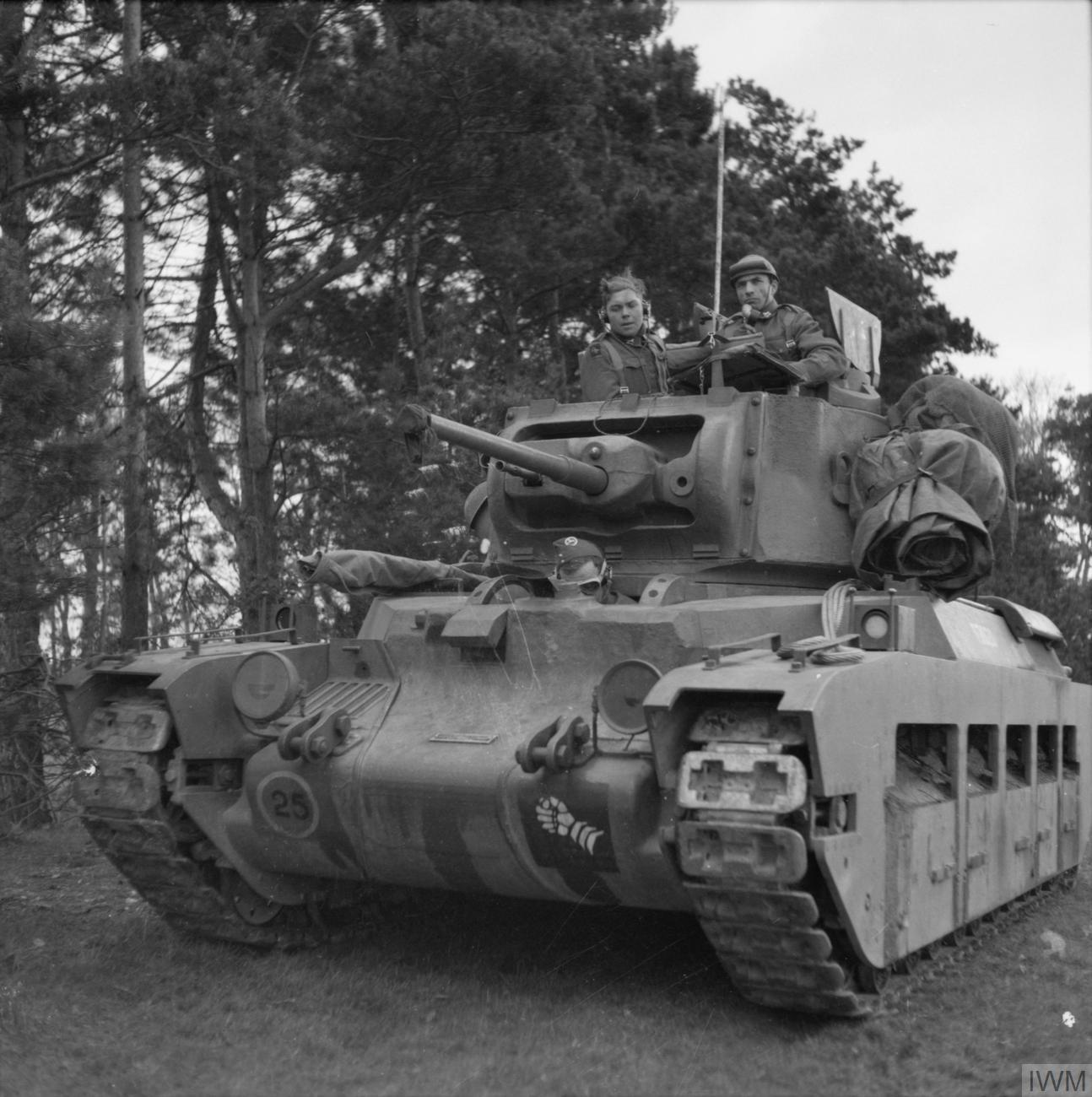
Matilda II on exercise in Britain in 1941

Frieser wrote that the Franco–British counter-attack at Arras, had a disproportionate effect on the Germans because the higher commanders were apprehensive about flank security. Ewald von Kleist, the commander of Panzergruppe von Kleist perceived a "serious threat" and informed Lieutenant-General Franz Halder, Chief of the General Staff of Oberkommando des Heeres (OKH), that he had to wait until the crisis was resolved before he continued. Colonel-General Günther von Kluge, the 4th Army commander, ordered the tanks to halt, with the support of Rundstedt. On 22 May, when the attack had been repulsed, Rundstedt ordered that the situation at Arras must be restored before Panzergruppe von Kleist moved on Boulogne and Calais. At OKW the panic was worse and Hitler contacted Army Group A on 22 May, to order that all mobile units were to operate either side of Arras and infantry units were to operate to the east.

The crisis among the higher staffs of the German Army was not apparent at the front and Halder formed the same conclusion as Guderian; that the real threat was that the Allies would retreat to the channel coast too quickly and a race for the Channel Ports began. Guderian ordered the 2nd Panzer Division to capture Boulogne, the 1st Panzer Division to take Calais and the 10th Panzer Division to seize Dunkirk. Most of the BEF and the French First Army were still 62 mi (100 km) from the coast but despite delays, British troops were sent from England to Boulogne and Calais just in time to forestall the XIX Corps panzer divisions on 22 May. Frieser wrote that had the panzers advanced at the same speed on 21 May as they had on 20 May, before the halt order stopped their advance for 24 hours, Boulogne and Calais would have fallen. Without a halt at Montcornet on 15 May and the second halt on 21 May after the Battle of Arras, the final halt order of 24 May would have been irrelevant because Dunkirk would have already been captured by the 10th Panzer Division.

== Commemoration ==
The battle honour Defence of Arras was awarded to the British units involved in the counter-attack.

== See also ==
- List of British military equipment of World War II
- List of French military equipment of World War II
- List of German military equipment of World War II
