= Dainville (disambiguation) =

Dainville is a commune in the Pas-de-Calais department in the Nord-Pas-de-Calais region of France.

Dainville can also relate to places:

- Dainville-Bertheléville
- Canton of Dainville

People, with the surname Dainville:

- Alain Oudot de Dainville (born 15 March 1947), French Navy officer.
- François de Dainville (1909–1971), French geographer, historian and Jesuit priest.
- Gérard de Dainville (died 13 June 1378), prelate of the Holy Roman Empire
