= Assou-Ekotto =

Assou-Ekotto is a surname. Notable people with the surname include:

- Benoît Assou-Ekotto (born 1984), footballer
- Mathieu Assou-Ekotto (born 1978), French footballer
