= Beaumetz-lès-Loges =

- Commune
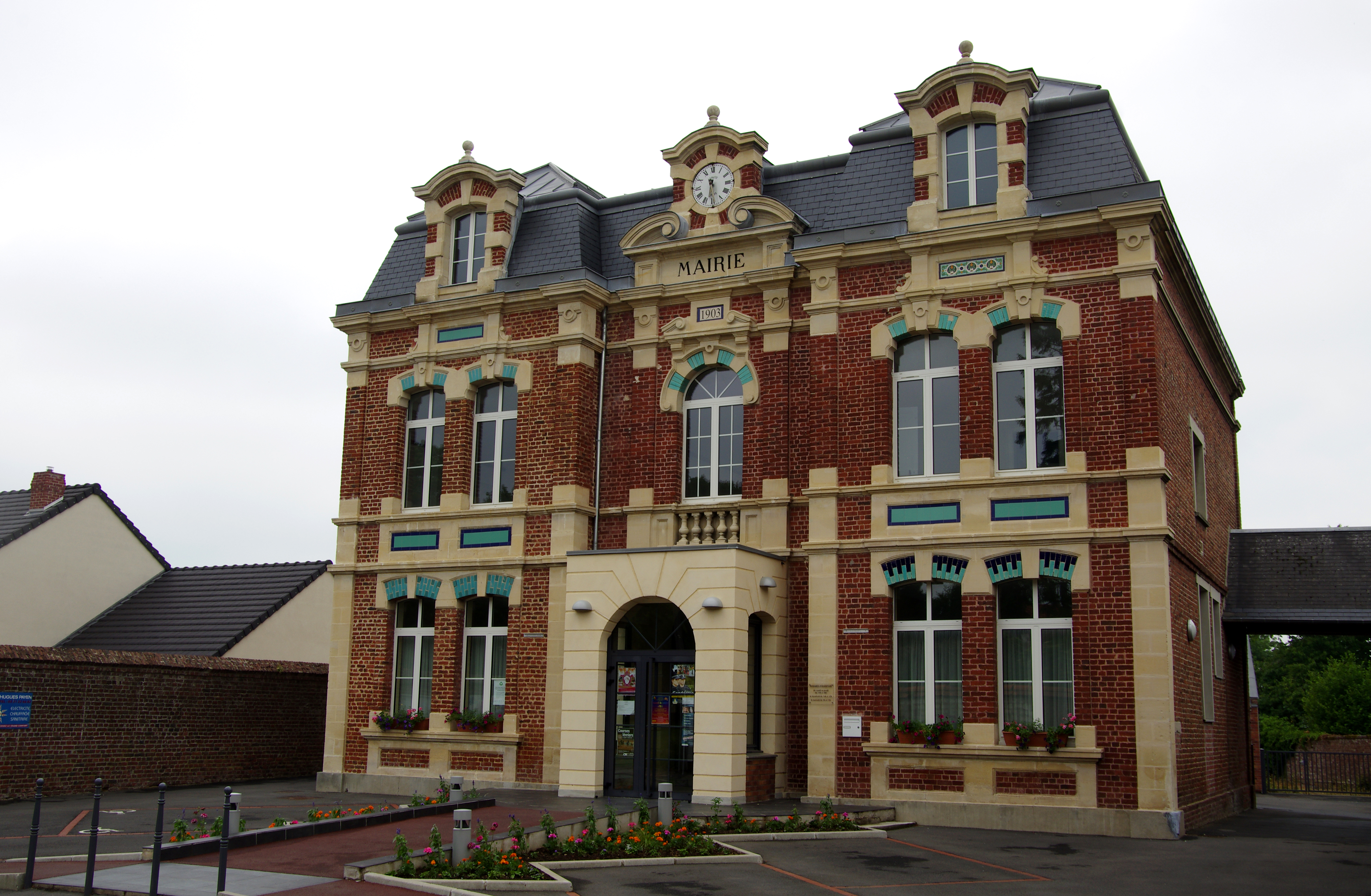
- The town hall of Beaumetz-lès-Loges

- Coat of arms
- Location of Beaumetz-lès-Loges
- Location within France Location within Hauts-de-France
- Coordinates: 50°14′37″N 2°39′25″E
- Country: France
- Region: Hauts-de-France
- Department: Pas-de-Calais
- Arrondissement: Arras
- Canton: Arras-1
- Intercommunality: CU d'Arras

Government
  - Mayor (2020–2026): Jean-Luc Tillard
- Area^{1}: 4.98 km^{2} (1.92 sq mi)
- Elevation: 144 m (472 ft)
- Highest elevation: 142 m (466 ft)
- Lowest elevation: 94 m (308 ft)
- Population (2023): 1,003
  - Density: 201/km^{2} (522/sq mi)
- Time zone: UTC+01:00 (CET)
  - Summer (DST): UTC+02:00 (CEST)
- INSEE/Postal code: 62097 /62123
- ^{1} French Land Register data, which excludes lakes, ponds, glaciers > 1 km^{2} (0.386 sq mi or 247 acres) and river estuaries.

Beaumetz-lès-Loges (French pronunciation: [bome lɛ lɔʒ]; Picard:Biaumetz-lès-Loges) is a commune in the Pas-de-Calais department in the Hauts-de-France region in northern France.

== Geography ==
A farming village located 7 miles (11 km) southwest of Arras at the junction of the N25 with the D7 road.

== Population ==
Historical population
Year	Pop.	±% p.a.
1968	570	—
1975	805	+5.06%
1982	954	+2.46%
1990	940	−0.18%
1999	909	−0.37%
2007	1,001	+1.21%
2012	957	−0.89%
2017	999	+0.86%
2023	1,003	+0.07%
Source: INSEE

== Sights ==
- The church of St. Michel, dating from the fifteenth century.
- Vestiges of an old castle.
- A World War I cemetery.

== See also ==
- Communes of the Pas-de-Calais department
