= Canton of Arras-1 =

Administrative division of Pas-de-Calais department

Coordinates: 50.29°N 2.75°E

The canton of Arras-1 is an administrative division of the Pas-de-Calais department, in northern France. It was created at the French canton reorganisation which came into effect in March 2015. Its seat is in Arras.

It consists of the following communes:

1. Acq
2. Anzin-Saint-Aubin
3. Arras (partly)
4. Beaumetz-lès-Loges
5. Dainville
6. Écurie
7. Étrun
8. Marœuil
9. Mont-Saint-Éloi
10. Neuville-Saint-Vaast
11. Roclincourt
12. Sainte-Catherine
13. Wailly
