= Mathieu Assou-Ekotto =

French footballer (born 1978)

Personal information
- Full name: Mathieu Assou-Ekotto
- Date of birth: 8 April 1978 (age 48)
- Place of birth: Sainte-Catherine, France
- Height: 1.77 m (5 ft 10 in)
- Position: Midfielder

Youth career
- 1989–1995: Lens

Senior career*
Years	Team	Apps	(Gls)
1995–1998	Lens B	44	(1)
1998	Lens	3	(0)
1998–2000	Mouscron	4	(0)
2000–2001	Créteil	18	(1)
2001–2003	Valenciennes	31	(4)
2003–2004	Grenoble	3	(0)
2004	La Louvière	29	(0)
2005	Standard Liège	25	(0)
2006–2007	Willem II	32	(1)
2007–2009	Mouscron	74	(0)
2010–2012	Boussu Dour	56	(3)
Total		319	(10)
- * Club domestic league appearances and goals

Mathieu Assou-Ekotto (born 8 April 1978) is a French retired footballer who played mainly as a midfielder.

Over the course of nine seasons, he amassed Belgian Pro League totals of 132 games and two goals, mainly in representation of Mouscron.

== Football career ==
Born in Sainte-Catherine, Pas-de-Calais, Assou-Ekotto spent nine years with local RC Lens all levels comprised but played mainly for the reserves during his spell, only appearing in three Ligue 1 games with the club. Released in the 1998 summer, he moved to Belgium and joined R.E. Mouscron.

In the 2000 off-season, Assou-Ekotto returned to France and played for three teams in three-and-a-half seasons, competing in the second, third and fourth divisions (in the latter two levels with Valenciennes FC). On 19 January 2004 he moved back to Belgium and its Pro League, signing with R.A.A. Louviéroise.

Assou-Ekotto contributed with 11 matches in the first half of the 2005–06 campaign to Standard Liège's runner-up position, before joining Willem II from the Netherlands in the following winter transfer window. In yet another January move, he signed for former club Mouscron – first joining on loan – going on to play with the Hainaut side until they folded in December 2009.

The following February, Assou-Ekotto resumed his career at Boussu Dour Borinage in the Belgian Second Division. He left by mutual consent in January 2012, returning days later.

== Personal life ==
Assou-Ekotto's younger brother, Benoît, was also a footballer. A defender, he too started his career at Lens, going on to spend several years in the Premier League with Tottenham Hotspur, and represented their ancestral Cameroon at international level.
