= Écurie =

Communes of France

- Commune
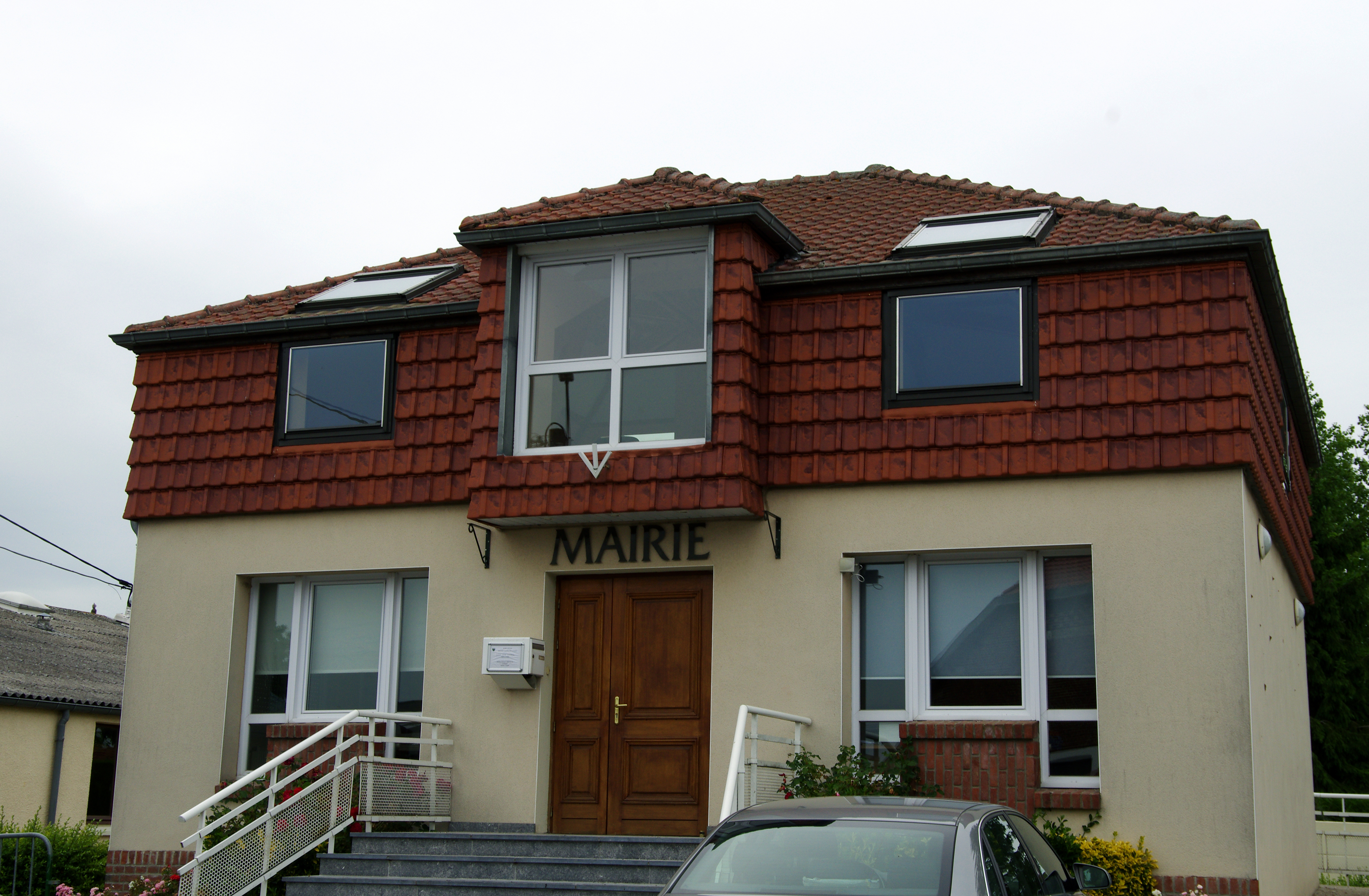
- The town hall of Écurie

- Coat of arms
- Location of Écurie
- Location within France Location within Hauts-de-France
- Coordinates: 50°19′50″N 2°46′13″E
- Country: France
- Region: Hauts-de-France
- Department: Pas-de-Calais
- Arrondissement: Arras
- Canton: Arras-1
- Intercommunality: CU Arras

Government
  - Mayor (2020–2026): Charline Caillierez
- Area^{1}: 2.99 km^{2} (1.15 sq mi)
- Elevation: 104 m (341 ft)
- Highest elevation: 106 m (348 ft)
- Lowest elevation: 85 m (279 ft)
- Population (2023): 370
  - Density: 120/km^{2} (320/sq mi)
- Time zone: UTC+01:00 (CET)
  - Summer (DST): UTC+02:00 (CEST)
- INSEE/Postal code: 62290 /62223
- ^{1} French Land Register data, which excludes lakes, ponds, glaciers > 1 km^{2} (0.386 sq mi or 247 acres) and river estuaries.

Écurie (French pronunciation: [ekyʁi]) is a commune in the Pas-de-Calais department in the Hauts-de-France region of France.

== Geography ==
A farming village situated 3 miles (4.8 km) north of Arras at the junction of the N17 and D60 roads.

== Population ==
Historical population
Year	Pop.	±% p.a.
1968	235	—
1975	299	+3.50%
1982	278	−1.03%
1990	268	−0.46%
1999	297	+1.15%
2007	399	+3.76%
2012	400	+0.05%
2017	386	−0.71%
2023	370	−0.70%
Source: INSEE

== Places of interest ==
- The church of St.Séverin, rebuilt, as was most of the village, after World War I.

== See also ==
- Communes of the Pas-de-Calais department
