= Sainte-Catherine, Pas-de-Calais =

Sainte-Catherine
- Commune
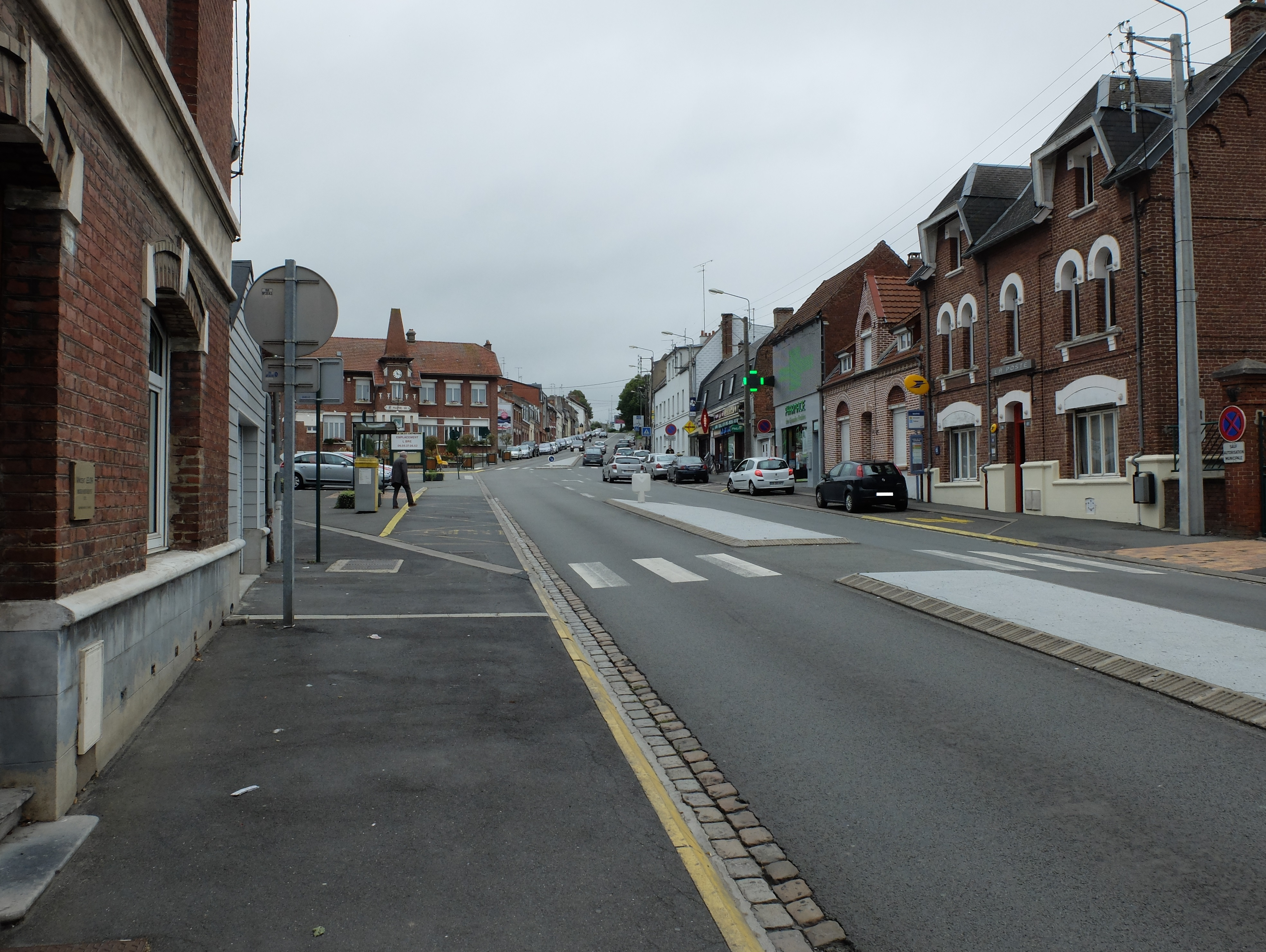
- A view within Sainte-Catherine

- Coat of arms
- Location of Sainte-Catherine
- Location within France Location within Hauts-de-France
- Coordinates: 50°18′28″N 2°45′50″E
- Country: France
- Region: Hauts-de-France
- Department: Pas-de-Calais
- Arrondissement: Arras
- Canton: Arras-1
- Intercommunality: CU d'Arras

Government
  - Mayor (2020–2026): Alain Van Ghelder
- Area^{1}: 4.4 km^{2} (1.7 sq mi)
- Elevation: 57 m (187 ft)
- Highest elevation: 105 m (344 ft)
- Lowest elevation: 53 m (174 ft)
- Population (2023): 3,471
  - Density: 790/km^{2} (2,000/sq mi)
- Time zone: UTC+01:00 (CET)
  - Summer (DST): UTC+02:00 (CEST)
- INSEE/Postal code: 62744 /62223
- ^{1} French Land Register data, which excludes lakes, ponds, glaciers > 1 km^{2} (0.386 sq mi or 247 acres) and river estuaries.

Sainte-Catherine (French pronunciation: [sɛ̃t katʁin]; also unofficially: Sainte-Catherine-lès-Arras, [sɛ̃t katʁin lez‿aʁas], literally Sainte-Catherine near Arras; Picard: Sainte-Cat'leine-lès-Aro) is a commune in the Pas-de-Calais department in the Hauts-de-France region of France 1 mile (1.6 km) north of the centre of Arras.

== Population ==
Historical population
Year	Pop.	±% p.a.
1968	2,105	—
1975	2,438	+2.12%
1982	3,203	+3.98%
1990	3,132	−0.28%
1999	3,017	−0.41%
2007	3,402	+1.51%
2012	3,401	−0.01%
2017	3,511	+0.64%
2023	3,471	−0.19%
Source: INSEE

== Notable people ==
- Mathieu Assou-Ekotto (born 1978), former footballer
- Nando de Colo (born 1987), basketball player

== See also ==
- Communes of the Pas-de-Calais department
