= Roclincourt =

- Commune
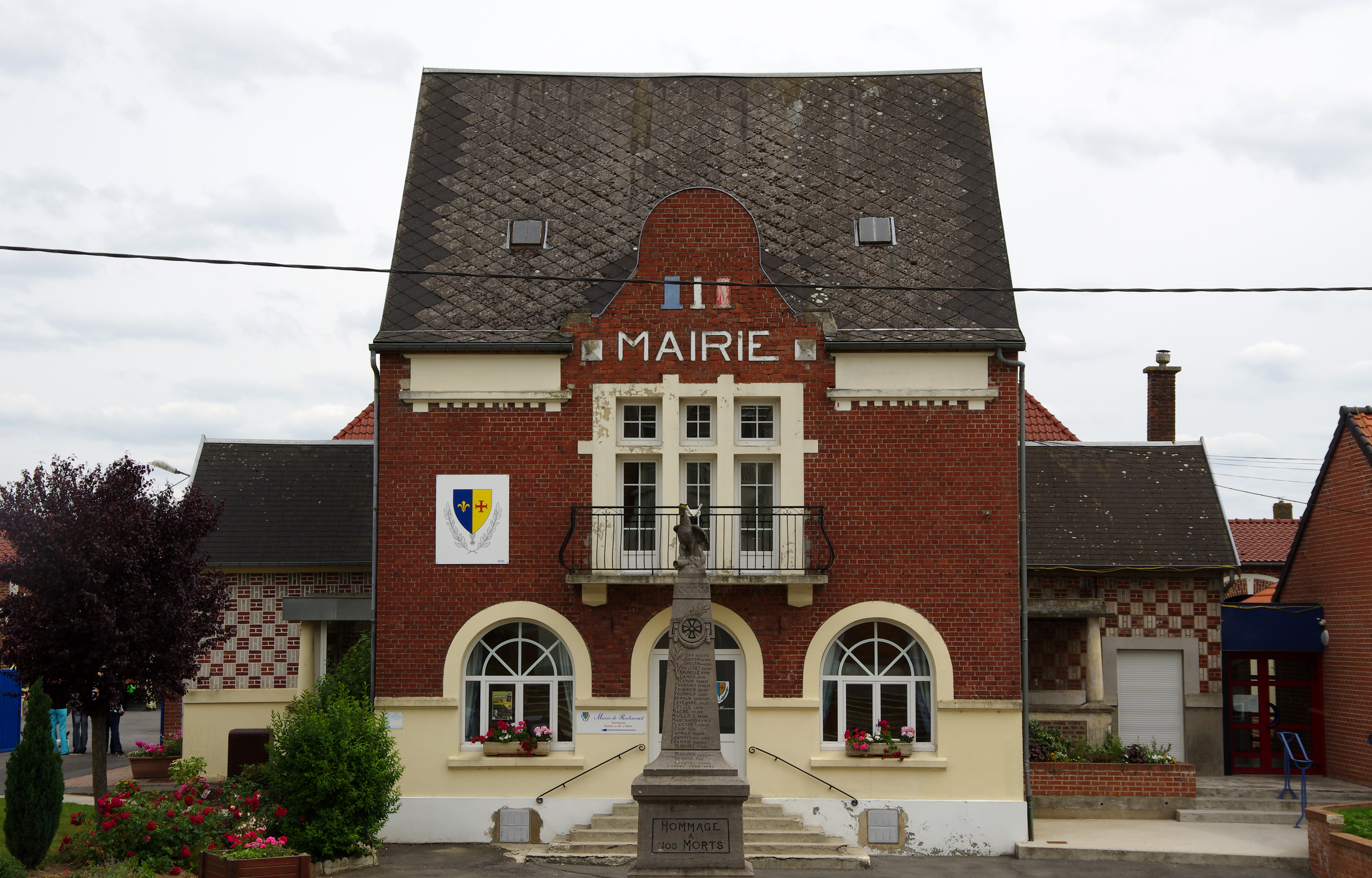
- The town hall of Roclincourt

- Coat of arms
- Location of Roclincourt
- Location within France Location within Hauts-de-France
- Coordinates: 50°19′33″N 2°47′13″E
- Country: France
- Region: Hauts-de-France
- Department: Pas-de-Calais
- Arrondissement: Arras
- Canton: Arras-1
- Intercommunality: CU Arras

Government
  - Mayor (2020–2026): Thierry Moulin
- Area^{1}: 5.93 km^{2} (2.29 sq mi)
- Elevation: 74 m (243 ft)
- Highest elevation: 111 m (364 ft)
- Lowest elevation: 68 m (223 ft)
- Population (2023): 794
  - Density: 134/km^{2} (347/sq mi)
- Time zone: UTC+01:00 (CET)
  - Summer (DST): UTC+02:00 (CEST)
- INSEE/Postal code: 62714 /62223
- ^{1} French Land Register data, which excludes lakes, ponds, glaciers > 1 km^{2} (0.386 sq mi or 247 acres) and river estuaries.

Roclincourt (French pronunciation: [ʁɔklɛ̃kuʁ]) is a commune in the Pas-de-Calais department in northern France.

== Geography ==
Roclincourt is 4 km (2.5 mi) north of the town of Arras, 13 km (8.1 mi) south of Lens, and approximately 110 km (68 mi) from Calais.

=== List of successive mayors ===
Name	Dates
Michel Godart	1995–2008
Michel Duez	1989–1995
Serge Chiroux	1977–1989
Paul Legland	1959–1967
Francois Charon	1953–1959

== History ==
=== World War I ===
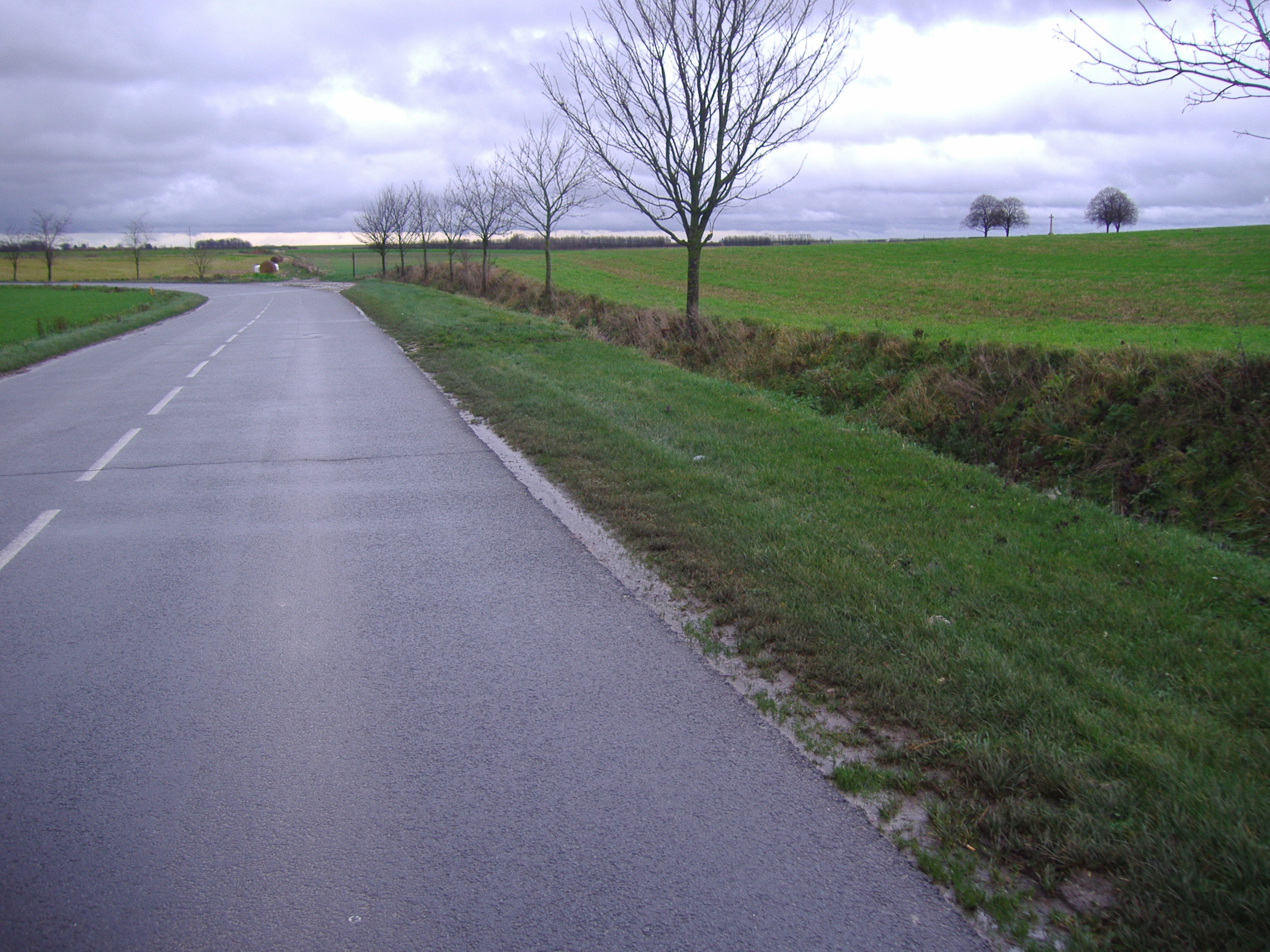
Front line to the northeast of the village

Roclincourt found itself uncomfortably close to most of the fighting during World War I, with tragic consequences for the village. During the opening years of the war, the nearby trenches were manned by French troops of the 10th Army. In February 1916, the 10th army was sent to reinforce Verdun, which had been under heavy attack by the Germans. In its place in the Roclincourt sector, British troops of 5th Division, 95th Brigade were sent in, namely the 1st Battalion of the Devonshire Regiment, who rotated every three days with the 1st Battalion of the East Surrey Regiment. The British troops were surprised and not pleased to find the trenches along this sector to be in a very poor condition. The parapets were in a very poor state and there were insufficient firing platforms. It took these two battalions some time to get the trenches back up to a good standard. On the plus side, the area had become relatively quiet, although there was a campaign of mining and counter-mining. To this day, craters can still be found along the line of the front in this area. The line suffered from occasional bombardments from the German lines. Both the Devonshires and the East Surreys suffered casualties due to these bombardments and members of both regiments can be found in the cemeteries around Roclincourt and Arras.

During World War I the village was very close to the front and by the end of the conflict it had been completely destroyed. The village was then rebuilt.

== Transportation ==
- Roads: 1 km (0.62 mi) east of N17, 3.9 km (2.4 mi) from Autoroute A26
- Rail: LGV Nord from Arras
- Bus: Local service
- Air: provincial Airport of Roclincourt

Close to the village is a provincial airport which is called Roclincourt and has the Airport ICAO code LFQD, were there is one runway that is 1,025m in length and 60m wide. The village has excellent road links, being close to a junction on the A26 autoroute which gives it good access to the whole of the European motorway network.

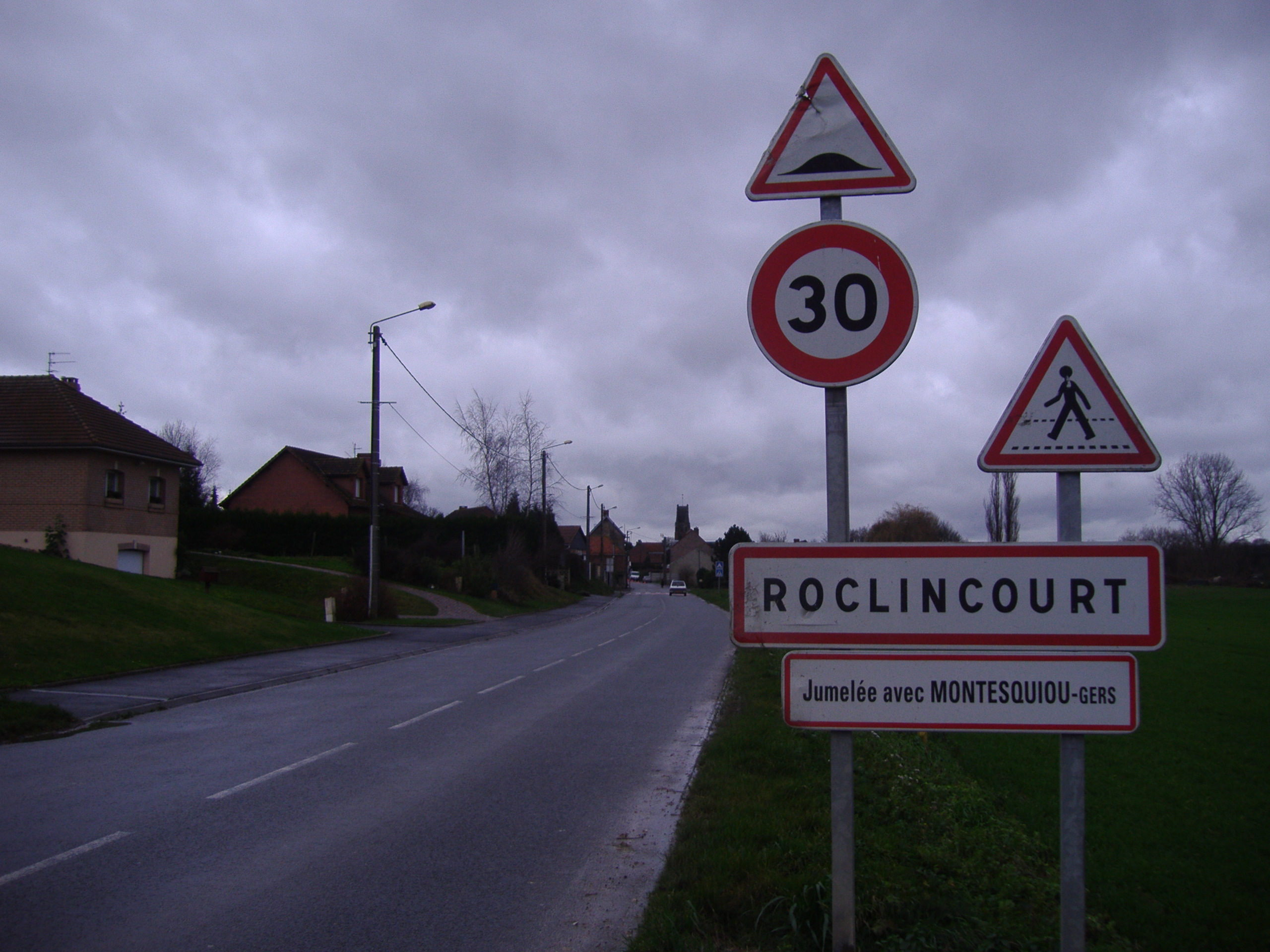

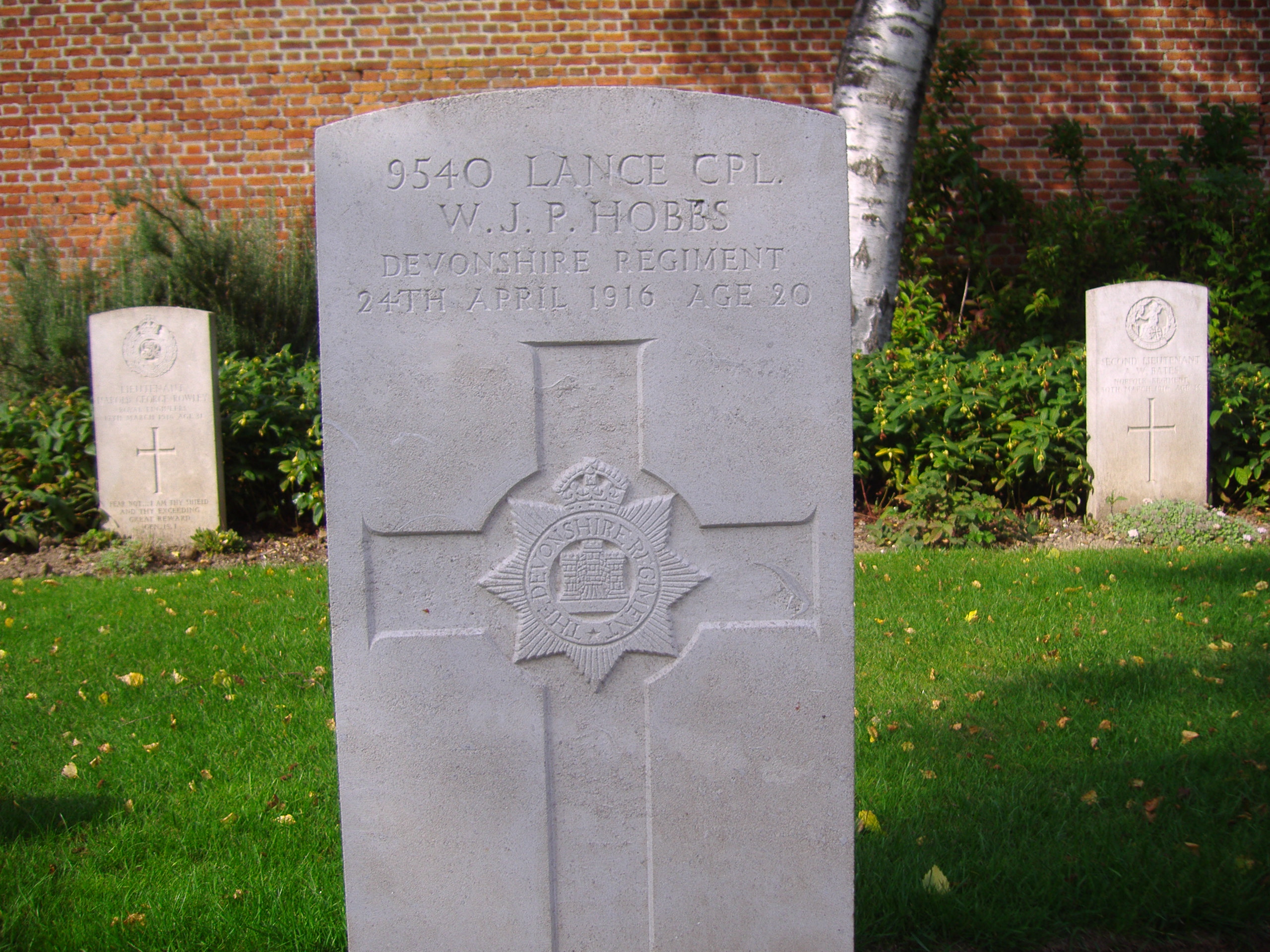
Headstone of W J P Hobbs killed in trenches at Roclincourt

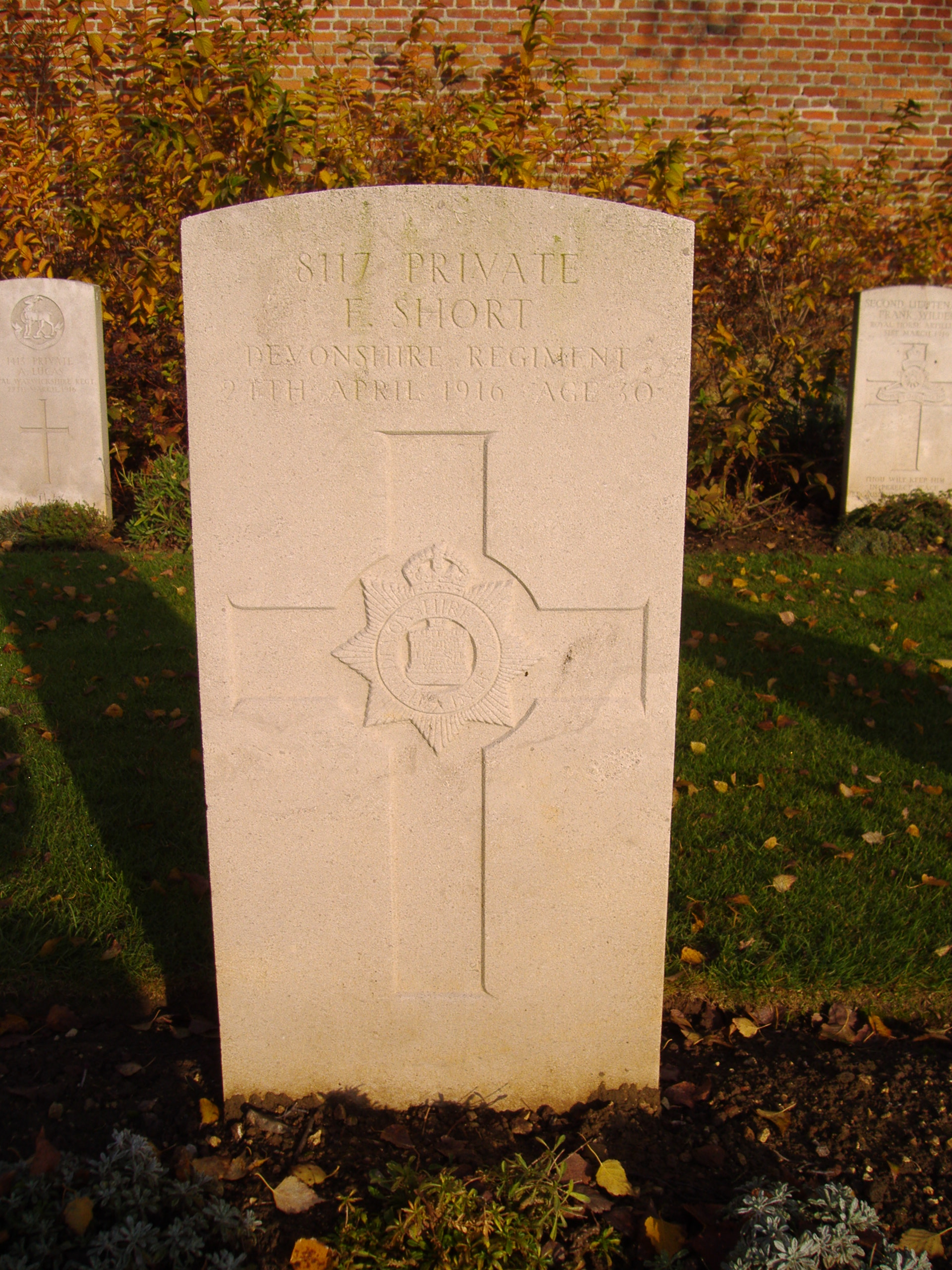
Headstone of F Short killed in trenches at Roclincourt

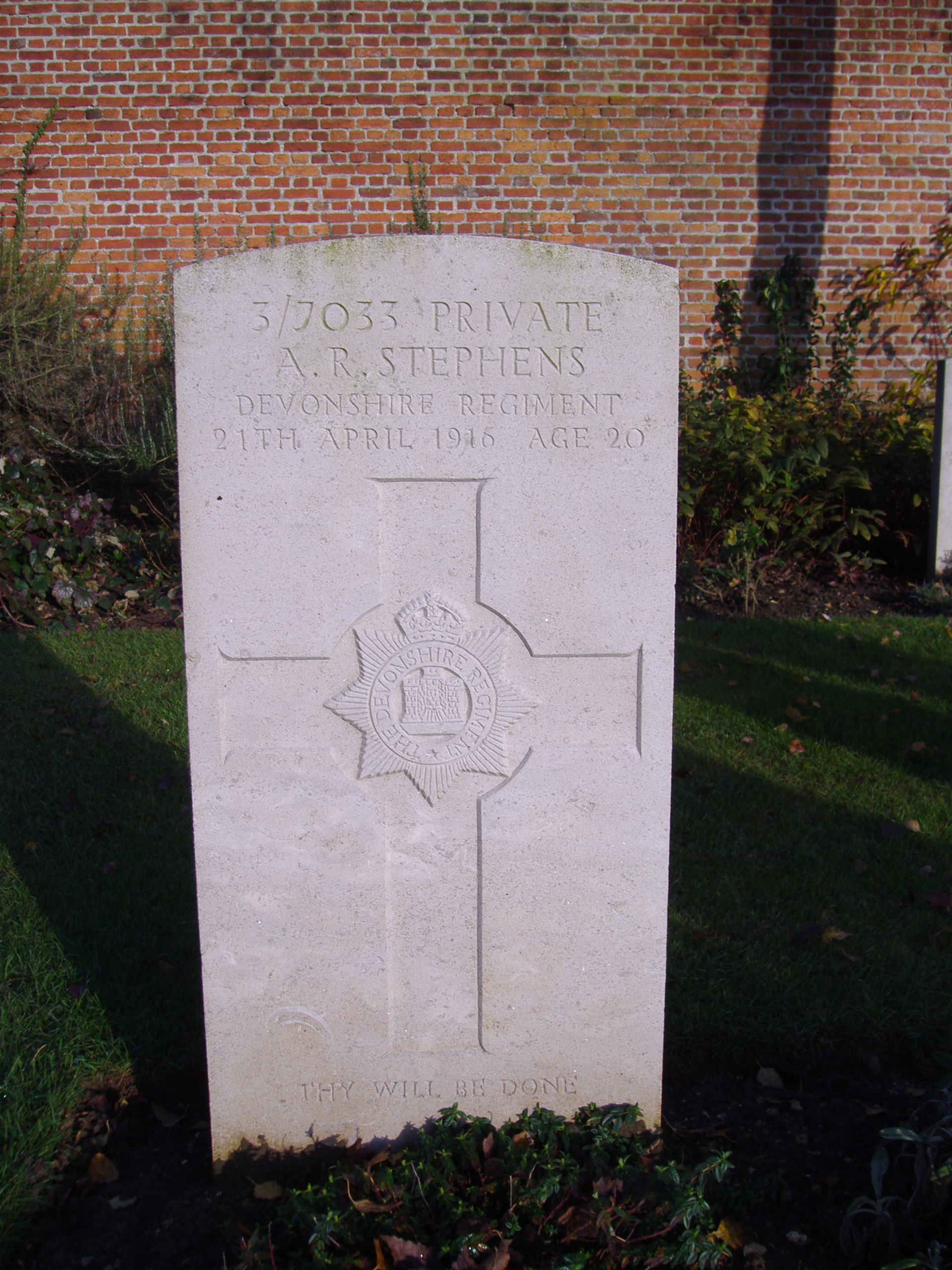
Headstone of A R Stephens killed in trenches at Roclincourt

== Twin towns ==
- Roclincourt has been twinned with Montesquiou, Gers, France, since 1999.

== See also ==
- Communes of the Pas-de-Calais department
