= Étrun =

Étrun Stroom
- Commune
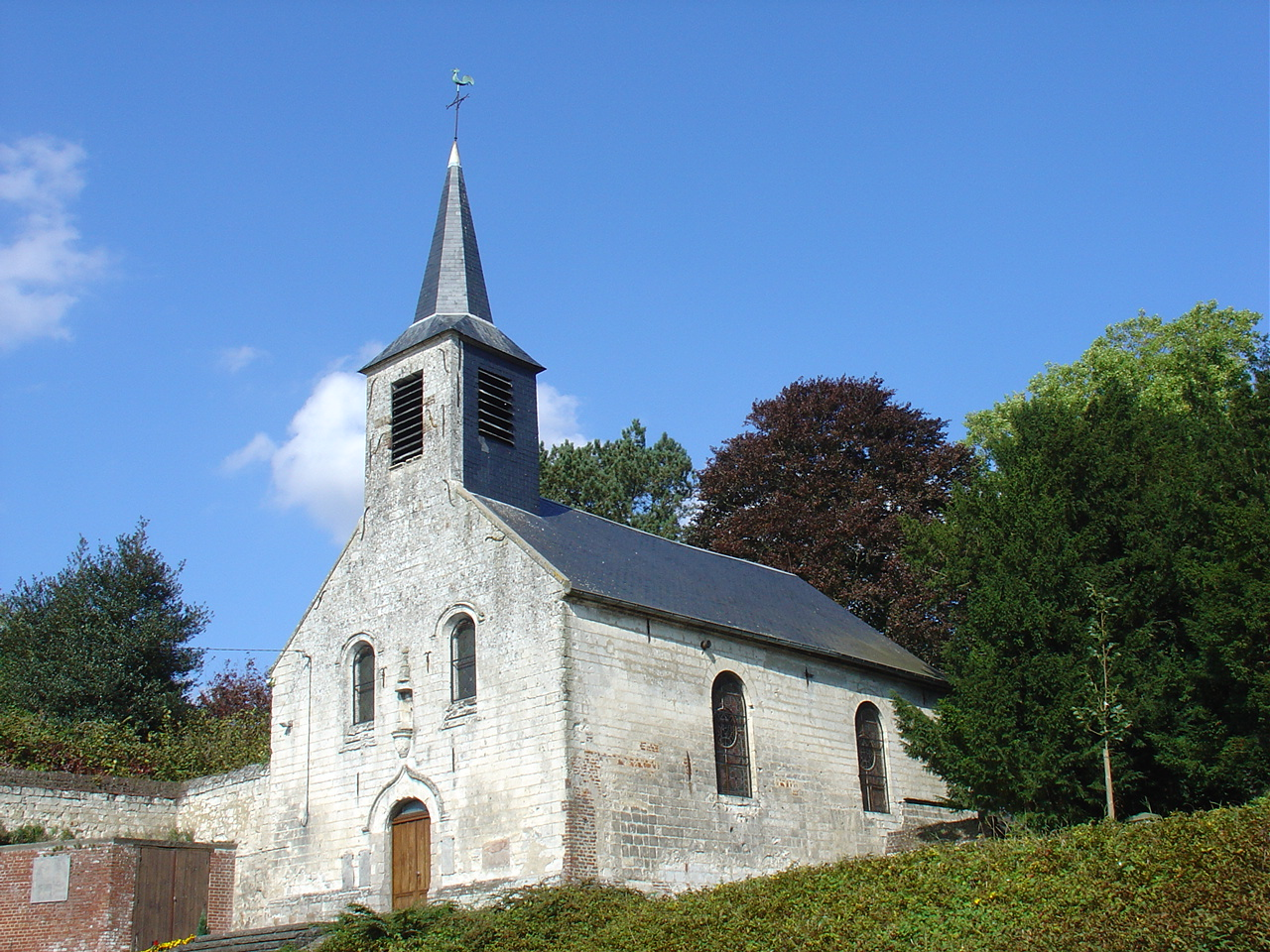
- The church of Étrun

- Coat of arms
- Location of Étrun
- Location within France Location within Hauts-de-France
- Coordinates: 50°18′54″N 2°42′07″E
- Country: France
- Region: Hauts-de-France
- Department: Pas-de-Calais
- Arrondissement: Arras
- Canton: Arras-1
- Intercommunality: CU Arras

Government
  - Mayor (2020–2026): Michel Mathissart
- Area^{1}: 2.22 km^{2} (0.86 sq mi)
- Elevation: 153 m (502 ft)
- Highest elevation: 107 m (351 ft)
- Lowest elevation: 58 m (190 ft)
- Population (2023): 327
  - Density: 147/km^{2} (381/sq mi)
- Time zone: UTC+01:00 (CET)
  - Summer (DST): UTC+02:00 (CEST)
- INSEE/Postal code: 62320 /62161
- ^{1} French Land Register data, which excludes lakes, ponds, glaciers > 1 km^{2} (0.386 sq mi or 247 acres) and river estuaries.

Étrun (French pronunciation: [etʁœ̃]; West Flemish: Stroom) is a commune in the Pas-de-Calais department in the Hauts-de-France region of France 4 miles (6.4 km) northwest of Arras. The river Gy flows through the commune.

== Population ==
Historical population
Year	Pop.	±% p.a.
1968	414	—
1975	367	−1.71%
1982	302	−2.75%
1990	336	+1.34%
1999	326	−0.34%
2007	328	+0.08%
2012	331	+0.18%
2017	314	−1.05%
2023	327	+0.68%
Source: INSEE

== See also ==
- Communes of the Pas-de-Calais department
