= Mont-Saint-Éloi =

Mont-Saint-Éloi Sint-Eloois Berg
- Commune
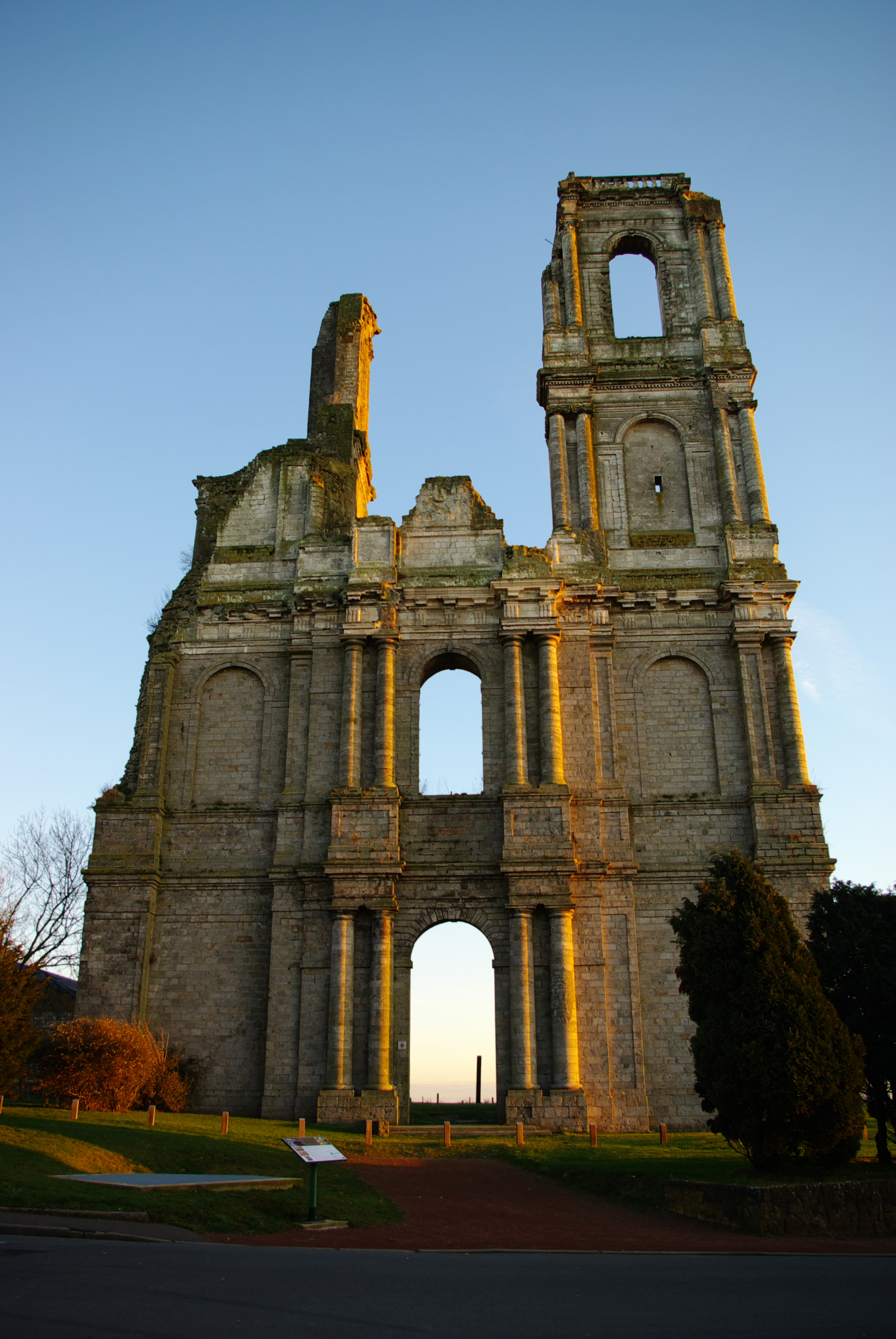
- Abbey of Mont Saint-Éloi

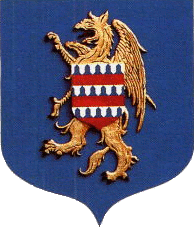
- Coat of arms
- Location of Mont-Saint-Éloi
- Location within France Location within Hauts-de-France
- Coordinates: 50°21′07″N 2°41′38″E
- Country: France
- Region: Hauts-de-France
- Department: Pas-de-Calais
- Arrondissement: Arras
- Canton: Arras-1
- Intercommunality: CU Arras

Government
  - Mayor (2026–32): Maureen Searle
- Area^{1}: 15.85 km^{2} (6.12 sq mi)
- Elevation: 135 m (443 ft)
- Highest elevation: 145 m (476 ft)
- Lowest elevation: 67 m (220 ft)
- Population (2023): 1,022
  - Density: 64.48/km^{2} (167.0/sq mi)
- Time zone: UTC+01:00 (CET)
  - Summer (DST): UTC+02:00 (CEST)
- INSEE/Postal code: 62589 /62144
- ^{1} French Land Register data, which excludes lakes, ponds, glaciers > 1 km^{2} (0.386 sq mi or 247 acres) and river estuaries.

Mont-Saint-Éloi (French pronunciation: [mɔ̃ sɛ̃.t‿elwa]; West Flemish: Sint-Elooisberg) is a commune in the Pas-de-Calais department in the Hauts-de-France region of France 5 miles (8 km) northwest of Arras, on the banks of the river Scarpe.

== Population ==
Historical population
Year	Pop.	±% p.a.
1968	1,042	—
1975	1,056	+0.19%
1982	1,023	−0.45%
1990	982	−0.51%
1999	1,018	+0.40%
2007	1,009	−0.11%
2012	1,011	+0.04%
2017	1,023	+0.24%
2023	1,022	−0.02%
Source: INSEE

== Mont Saint-Éloi Abbey ==
The monastery was founded in the 7th century by Vindicianus, bishop of Arras and devotee of Saint Eligius. The bishop was buried in the nearby Bois d'Ecoives, but his relics were subsequently removed to the Abbey Church of St. Joseph, which was enlarged in the 11th century. The abbey adopted the Rule of Saint Augustine, and was the motherhouse of St. Botolph's Priory in Colchester. The medieval buildings were demolished in 1750 to make way for a church and convent, necessitated by the aging and shallow foundations of the old abbey.

During the French Revolution, the monks left and the abbey was converted into a quarry and pillaged for the stone. What remained of the towers and facade serving as a military observation point during the First World War. In 1915 heavy shelling damaged the towers. It is a protected monument.

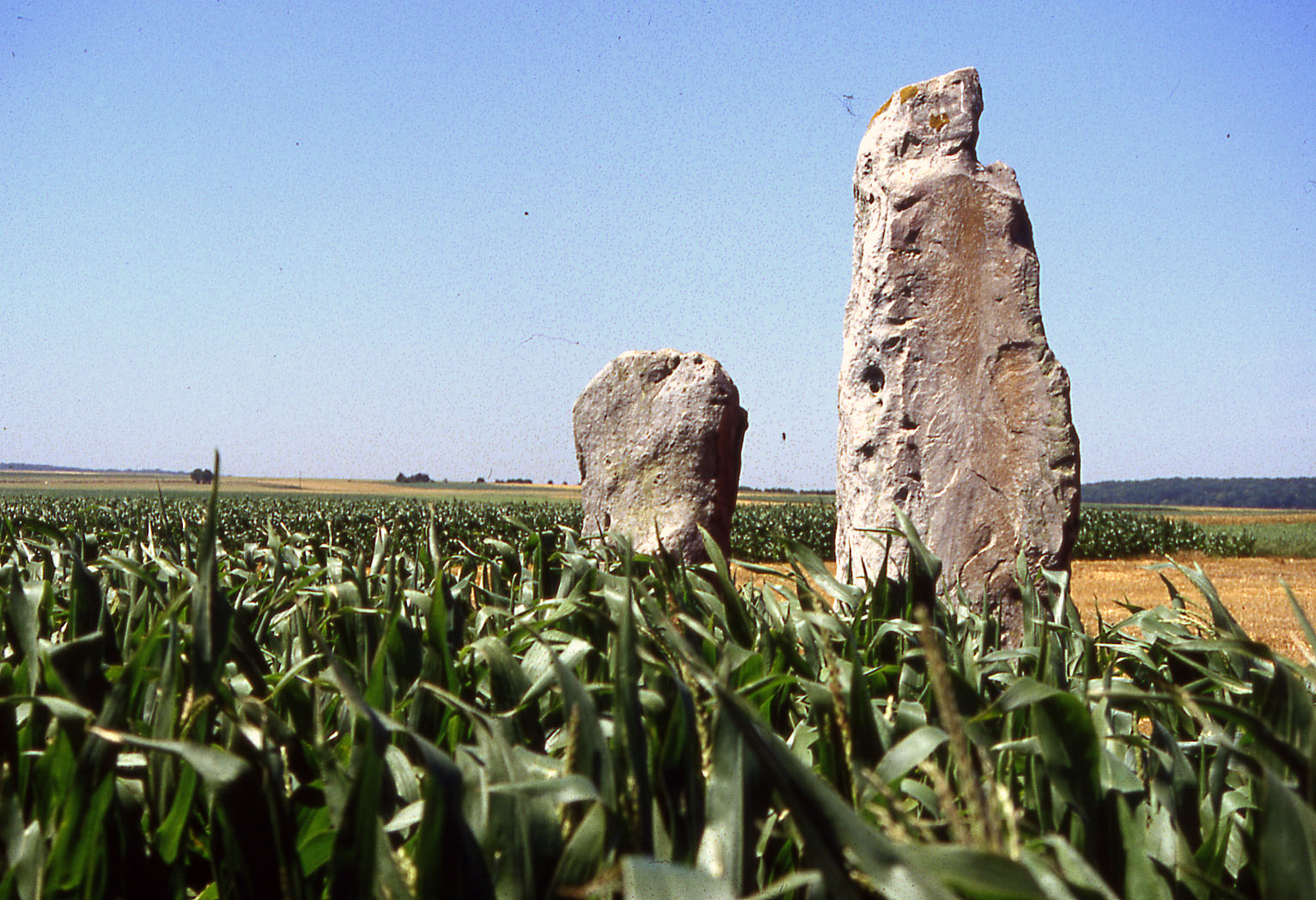
The menhirs

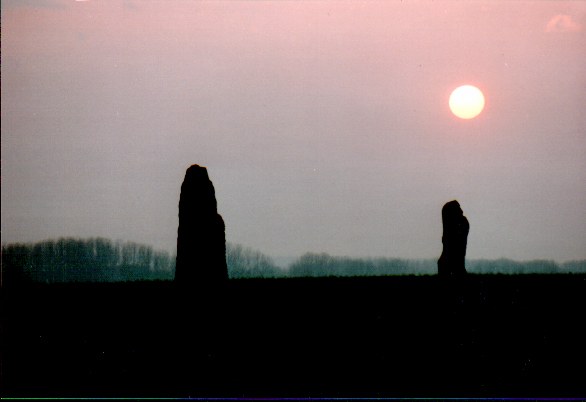
Menhirs

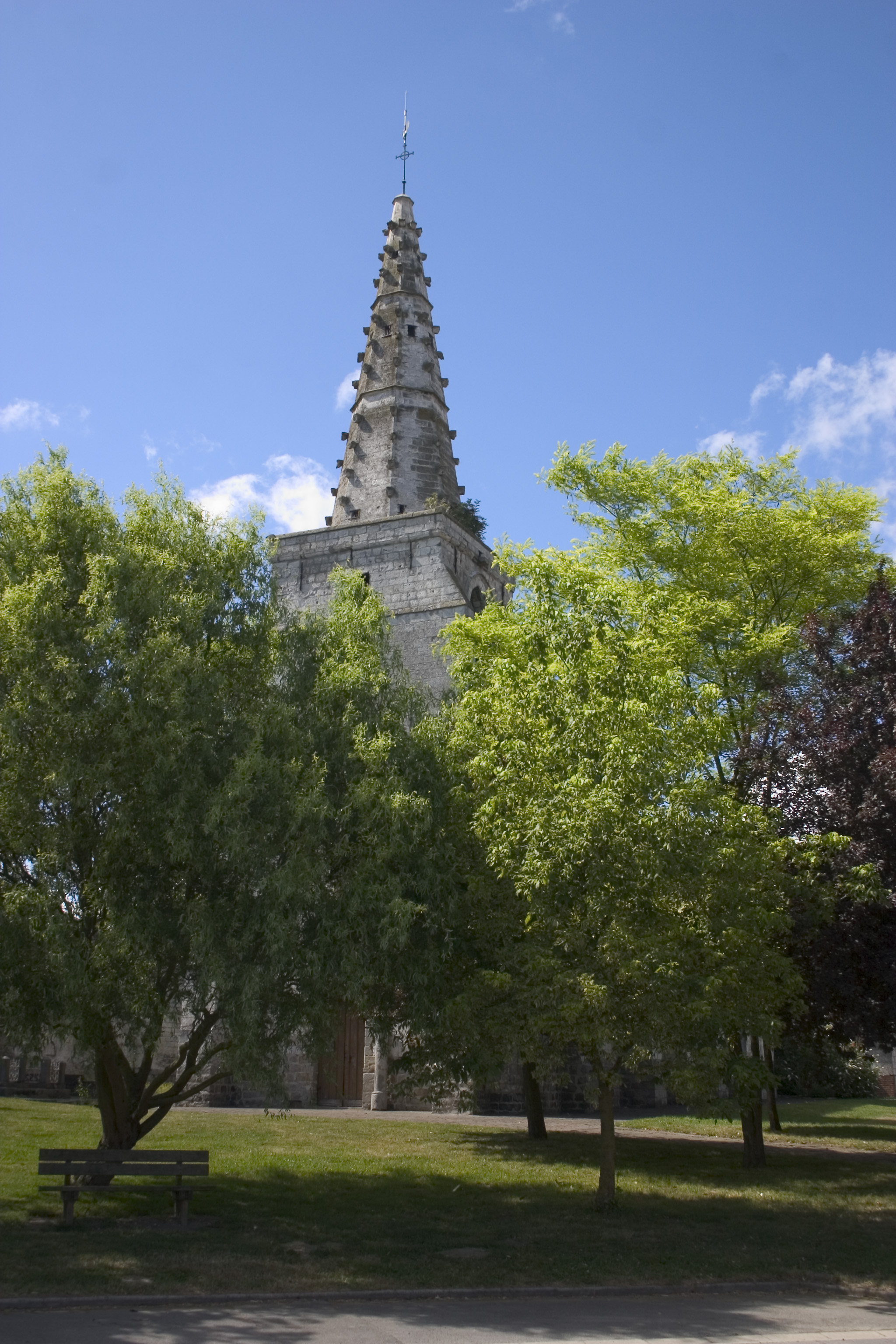
Écoivres village

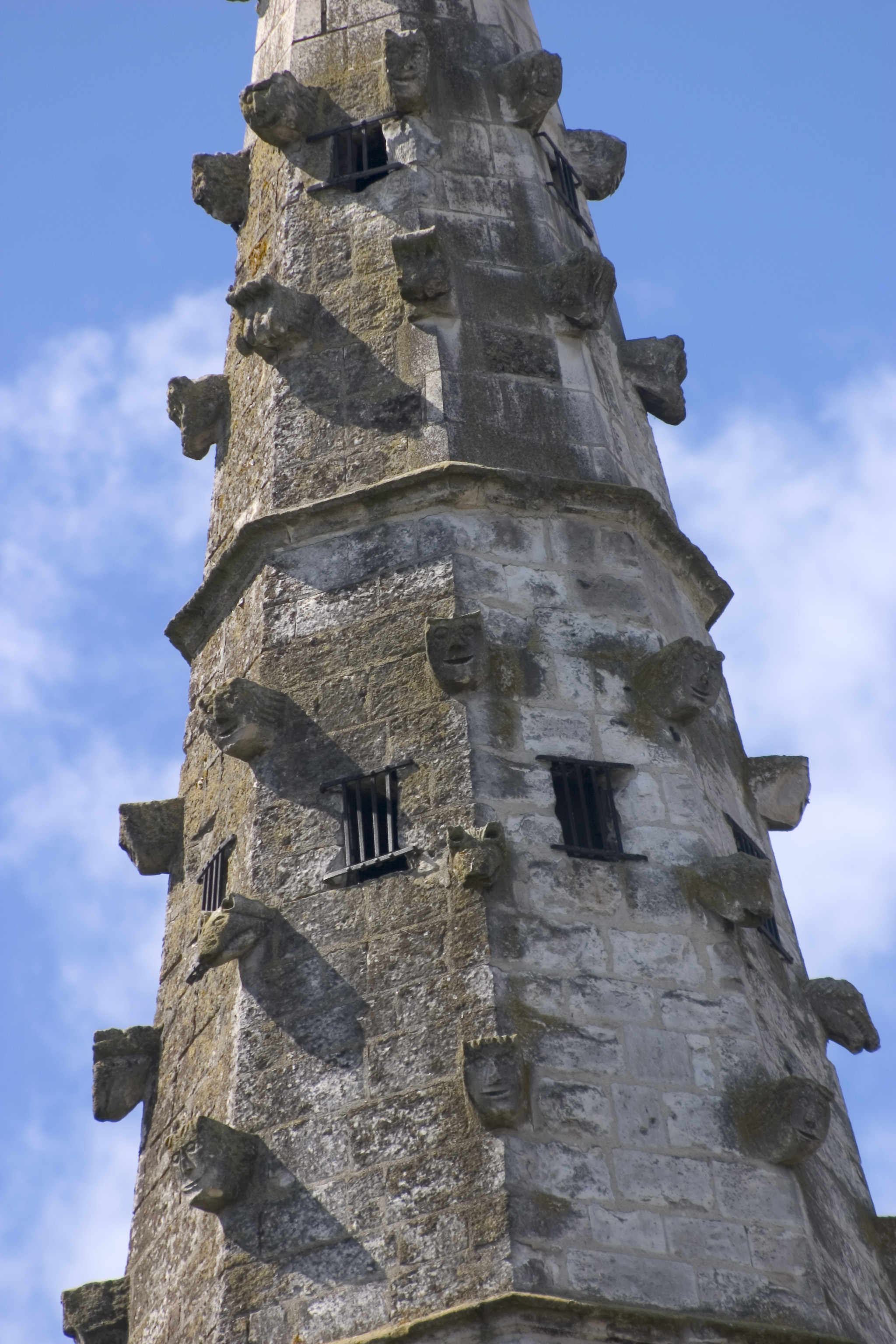
Features on the church spire

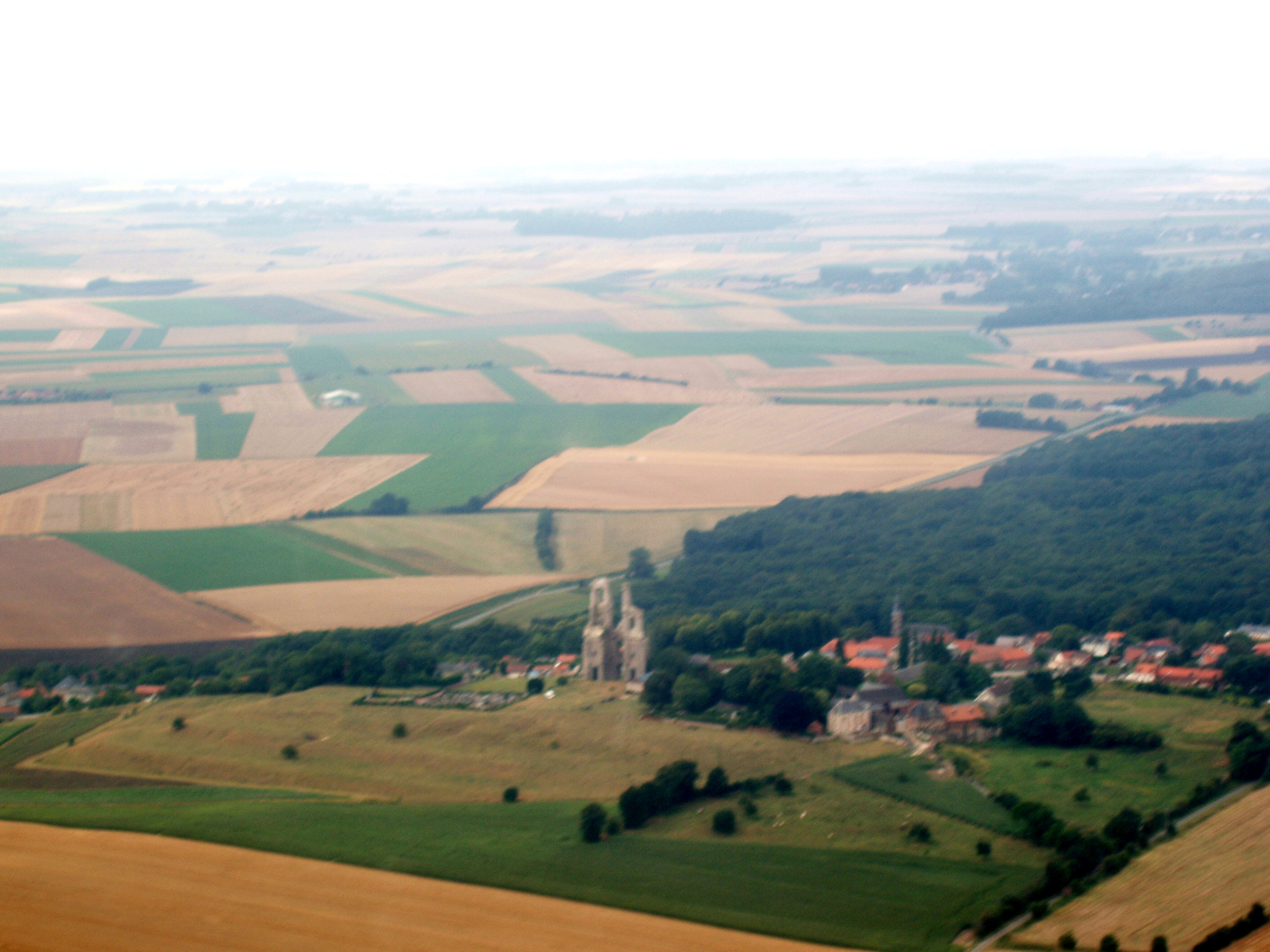
Aerial view of the countryside

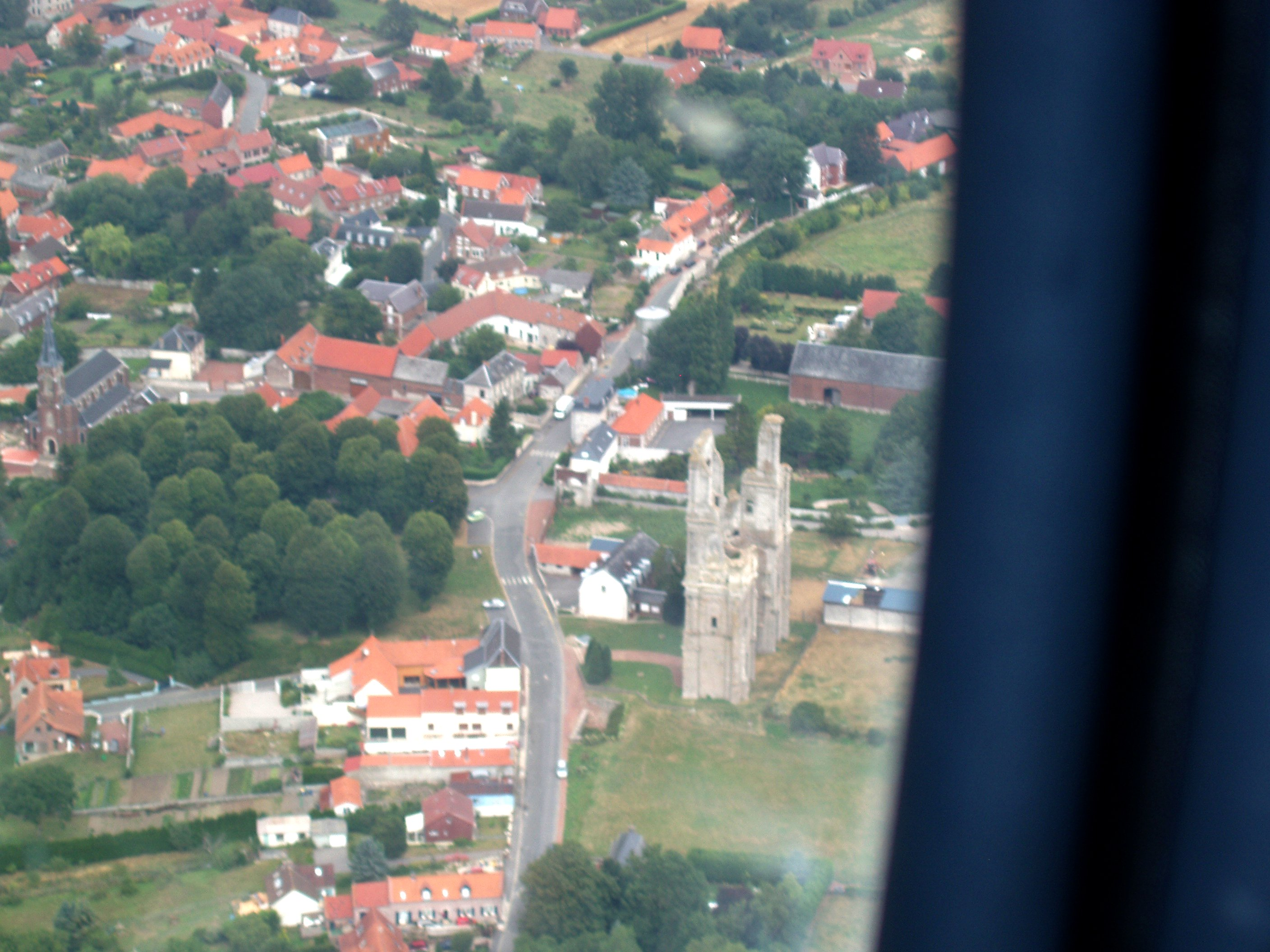
Aerial view

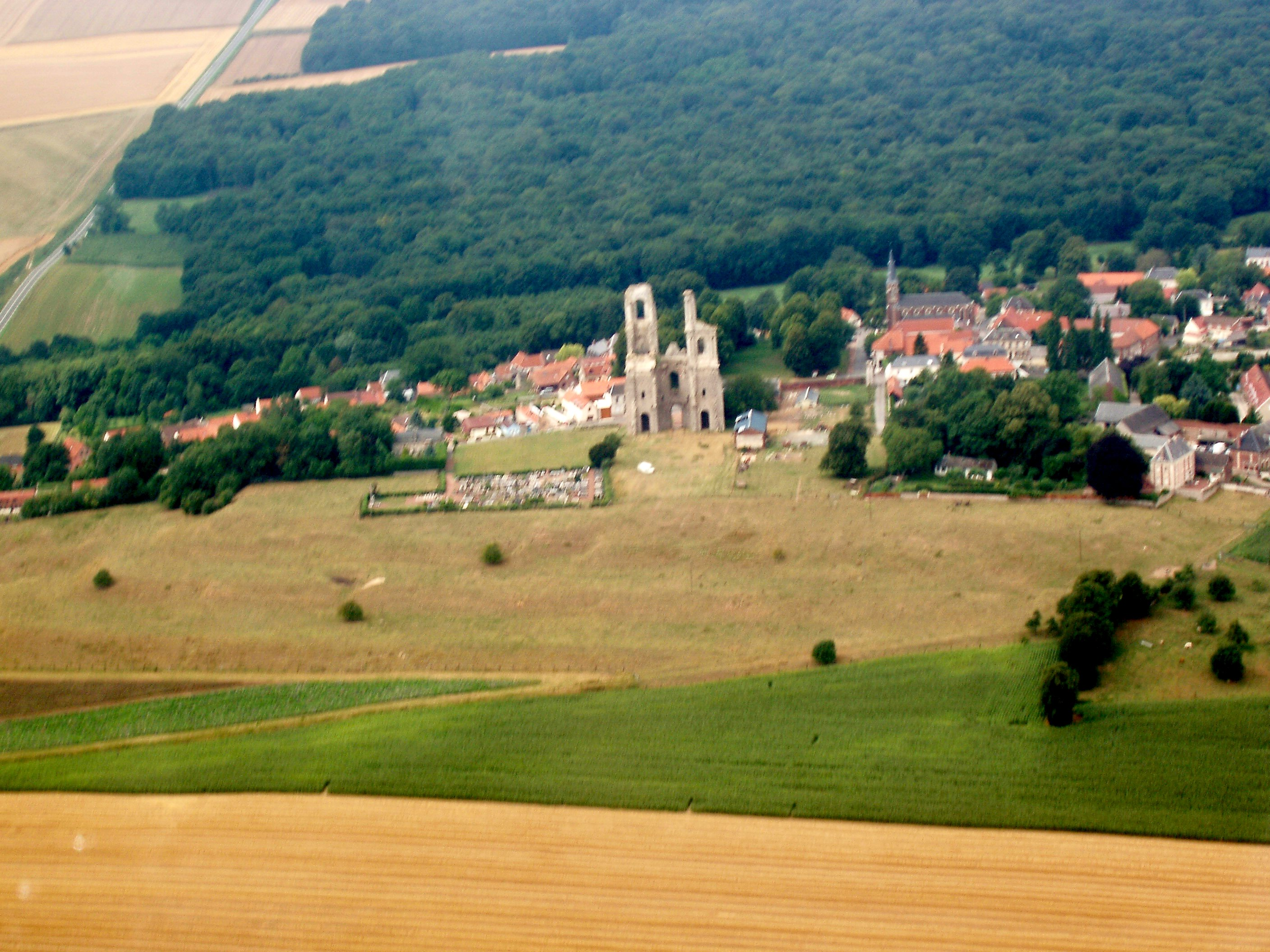
Aerial view of the abbey

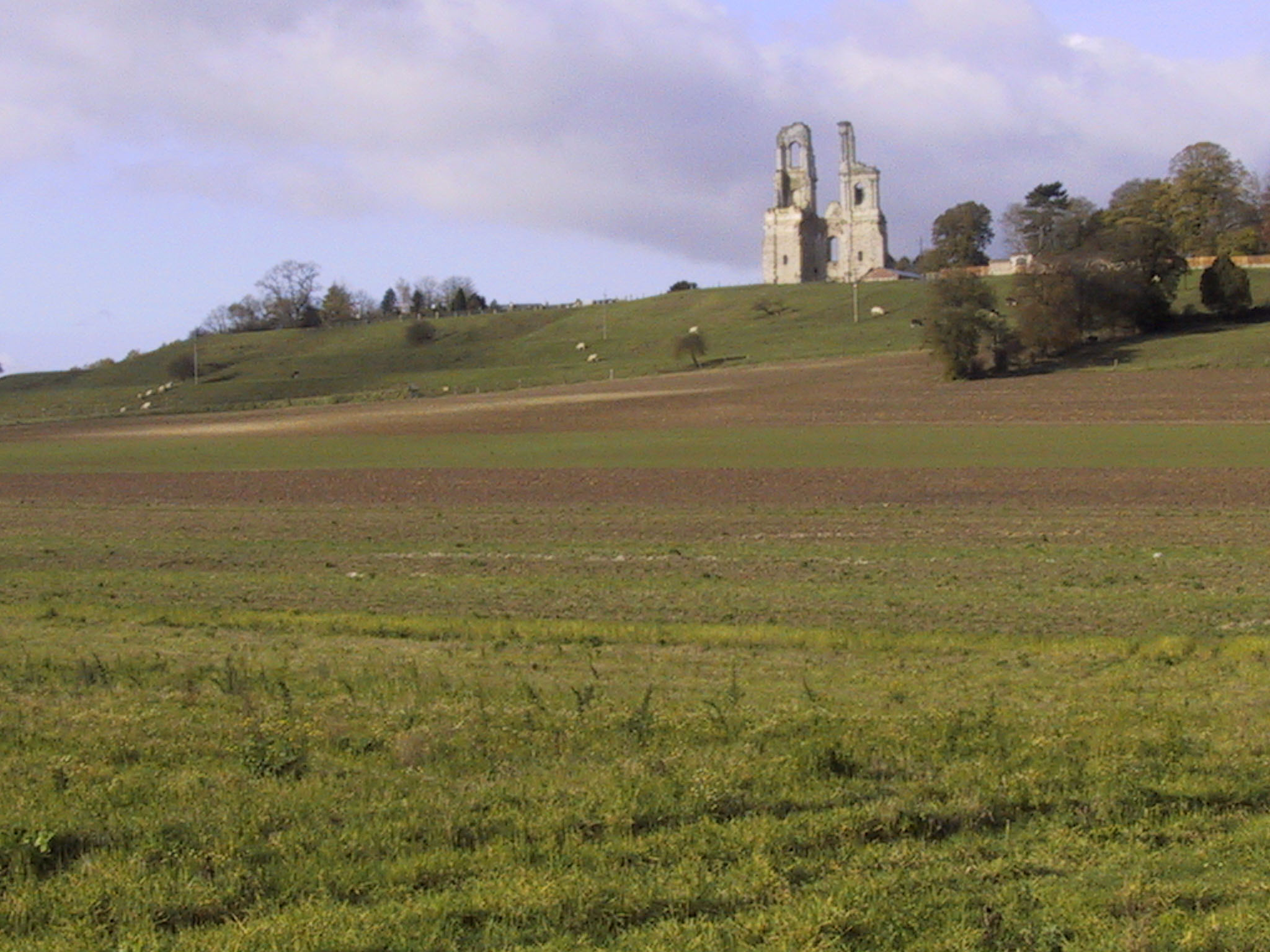
Towers of the abbey of Mont Saint-Éloi

== See also ==
- Communes of the Pas-de-Calais department
