= Anzin-Saint-Aubin =

- Commune
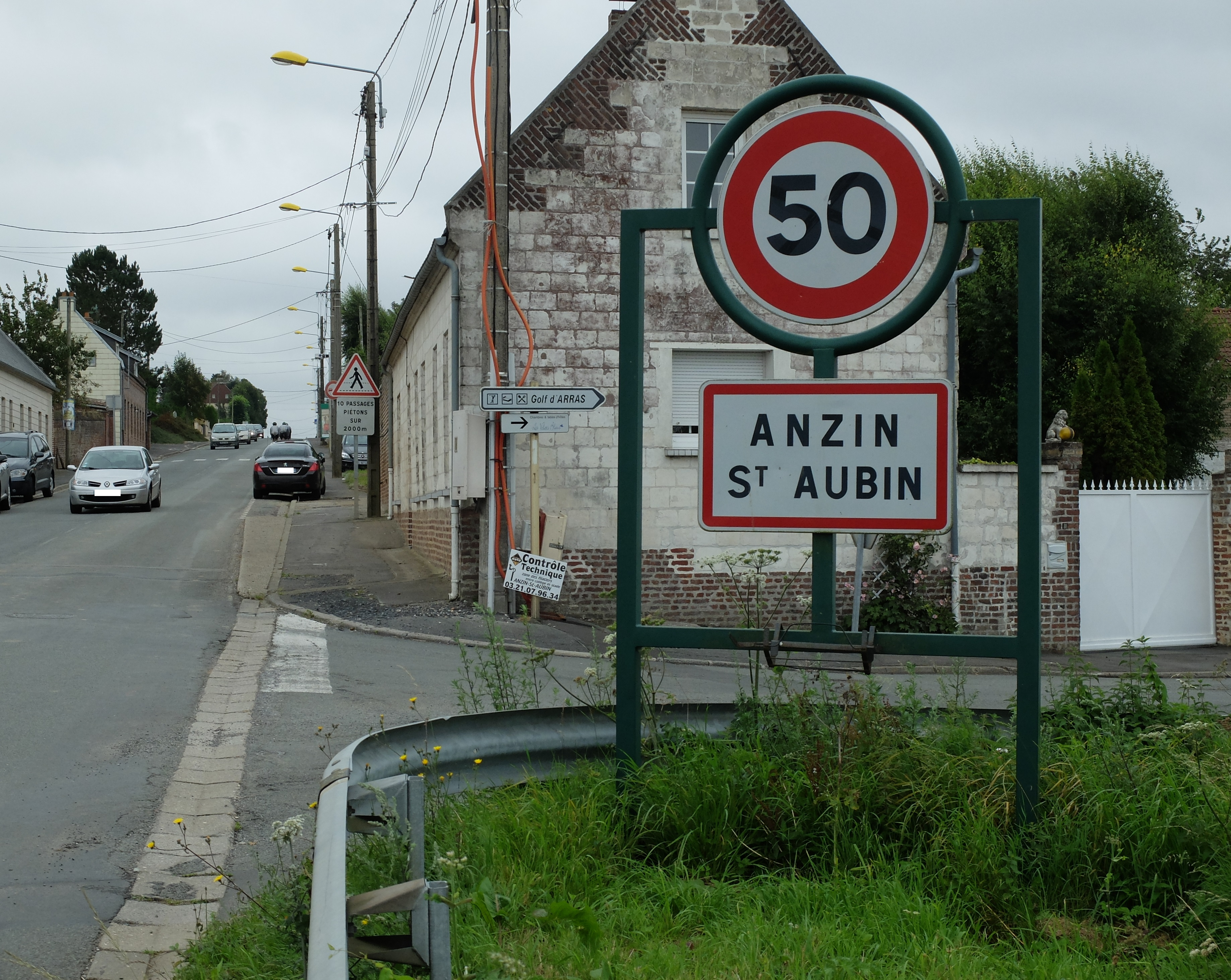
- The road into Anzin-Saint-Aubin

- Coat of arms
- Location of Anzin-Saint-Aubin
- Location within France Location within Hauts-de-France
- Coordinates: 50°18′54″N 2°44′43″E
- Country: France
- Region: Hauts-de-France
- Department: Pas-de-Calais
- Arrondissement: Arras
- Canton: Arras-1
- Intercommunality: CU d'Arras

Government
  - Mayor (2020–2026): Valérie El Hamine
- Area^{1}: 5.13 km^{2} (1.98 sq mi)
- Elevation: 68 m (223 ft)
- Highest elevation: 94 m (308 ft)
- Lowest elevation: 56 m (184 ft)
- Population (2023): 2,833
  - Density: 552/km^{2} (1,430/sq mi)
- Time zone: UTC+01:00 (CET)
  - Summer (DST): UTC+02:00 (CEST)
- INSEE/Postal code: 62037 /62223
- ^{1} French Land Register data, which excludes lakes, ponds, glaciers > 1 km^{2} (0.386 sq mi or 247 acres) and river estuaries.

Anzin-Saint-Aubin (French pronunciation: [ɑ̃zɛ̃ sɛ̃t‿obɛ̃]) is a commune in the Pas-de-Calais department in northern France.

== Geography ==
A suburb located 2 miles (3 km) northwest of Arras, at the junction of the D341, D60 and D64 roads, by the banks of the river Scarpe.

== History ==
Anzin St. Aubin was formed from two villages: Saint Aubin, formerly Saint Aubin in the Marsh, on the road to Arras, by the Scarpe river and Anzin, on the same road, but further east, bordering on Arras.
The parish was created around the 12th century, with the church being built at Saint Aubin (the larger of the two villages).
The name of Anzin (Anzinum) appears around 866-870, that of Saint Aubin (Sancti Albini of Marex) only appears in 1154. In the 16th century, the abbey at Saint Vaast built a watermill at Anzin. This mill (its remains still exist) mostly manufactured oil but also gunpowder and paper.
During the years 1793–1794 the town became "the united brothers" under revolutionary leadership. The commune was first created in 1790 with the election of the first municipal council and the mayor, Noël Douchet, a 56-year-old farmer. All the property of the church was sold.
In the early 19th century, Anzin grew in population and many houses were built along the old Roman road, the Chausée Brunehaut.
The village was all but destroyed during World War I, having served as a base for soldiers and artillery. The church and the chateau were transformed into hospitals.
The population suffered again during the Second World War, from 1939 to 1945, as more people died in battle or in captivity, while others participated in the resistance or helping prisoners to escape.

== Population ==
Historical population
Year	Pop.	±% p.a.
1968	1,052	—
1975	1,278	+2.82%
1982	1,726	+4.39%
1990	2,543	+4.96%
1999	2,470	−0.32%
2007	2,692	+1.08%
2012	2,734	+0.31%
2017	2,742	+0.06%
2023	2,833	+0.55%
Source: INSEE

== Sights ==
- The church of St. Aubin, dating from the seventeenth century.
- The church of Sacré-coeur, dating from the nineteenth century.
- The eighteenth-century chateau, nowadays the mairie.
- The brightly painted water-tower.
- Arras golf course.
- The war memorial

== See also ==
- Communes of the Pas-de-Calais department
