= Acq, Pas-de-Calais =

Acq As
- Commune
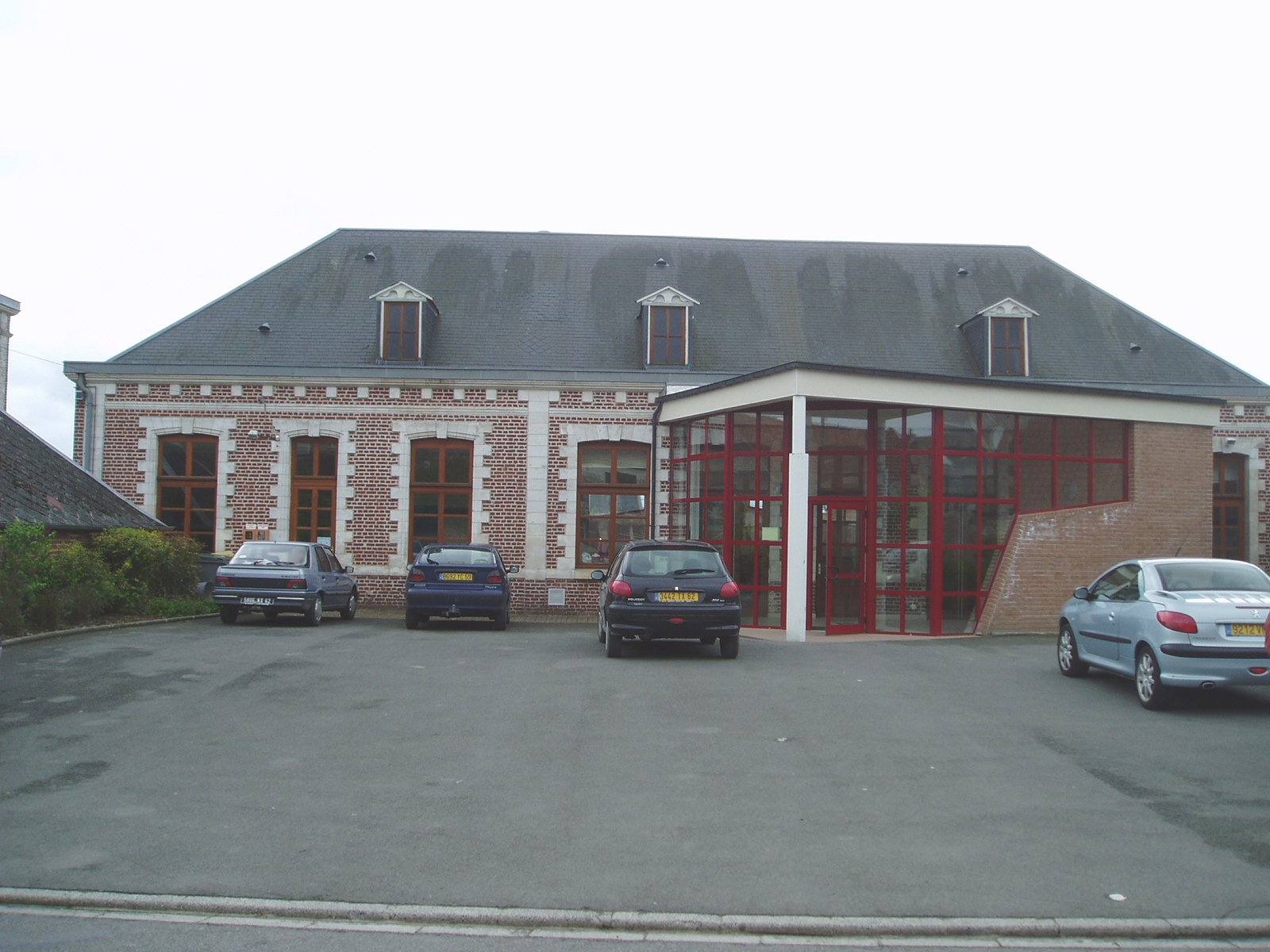
- Town hall

- Coat of arms
- Location of Acq
- Location within France Location within Hauts-de-France
- Coordinates: 50°20′54″N 2°39′27″E
- Country: France
- Region: Hauts-de-France
- Department: Pas-de-Calais
- Arrondissement: Arras
- Canton: Arras-1
- Intercommunality: Arras

Government
  - Mayor (2020–2026): Alain Bartier
- Area^{1}: 4.86 km^{2} (1.88 sq mi)
- Elevation: 91 m (299 ft)
- Highest elevation: 145 m (476 ft)
- Lowest elevation: 77 m (253 ft)
- Population (2023): 783
  - Density: 161/km^{2} (417/sq mi)
- Time zone: UTC+01:00 (CET)
  - Summer (DST): UTC+02:00 (CEST)
- INSEE/Postal code: 62007 /62144
- ^{1} French Land Register data, which excludes lakes, ponds, glaciers > 1 km^{2} (0.386 sq mi or 247 acres) and river estuaries.

Acq (French pronunciation: [ak]; West Flemish: As) is a commune in the Pas-de-Calais department in northern France.

== Geography ==
A farming village located 6 miles (9 km) northwest of Arras, by the banks of the Scarpe river, at the D62 and D49 road junction.

== Population ==
Historical population
Year	Pop.	±% p.a.
1968	413	—
1975	412	−0.03%
1982	457	+1.49%
1990	511	+1.41%
1999	502	−0.20%
2007	449	−1.39%
2012	691	+9.00%
2017	769	+2.16%
2023	783	+0.30%
Source: INSEE

== Sights ==
- The church of St.Géry, dating from the sixteenth century.
- The remains of a motte of an ancient castle.
- Two menhirs nearby, known as the 'Stones of Acq'.

== See also ==
- Communes of the Pas-de-Calais department
