= Marœuil =

Marœuil Marol
- Commune
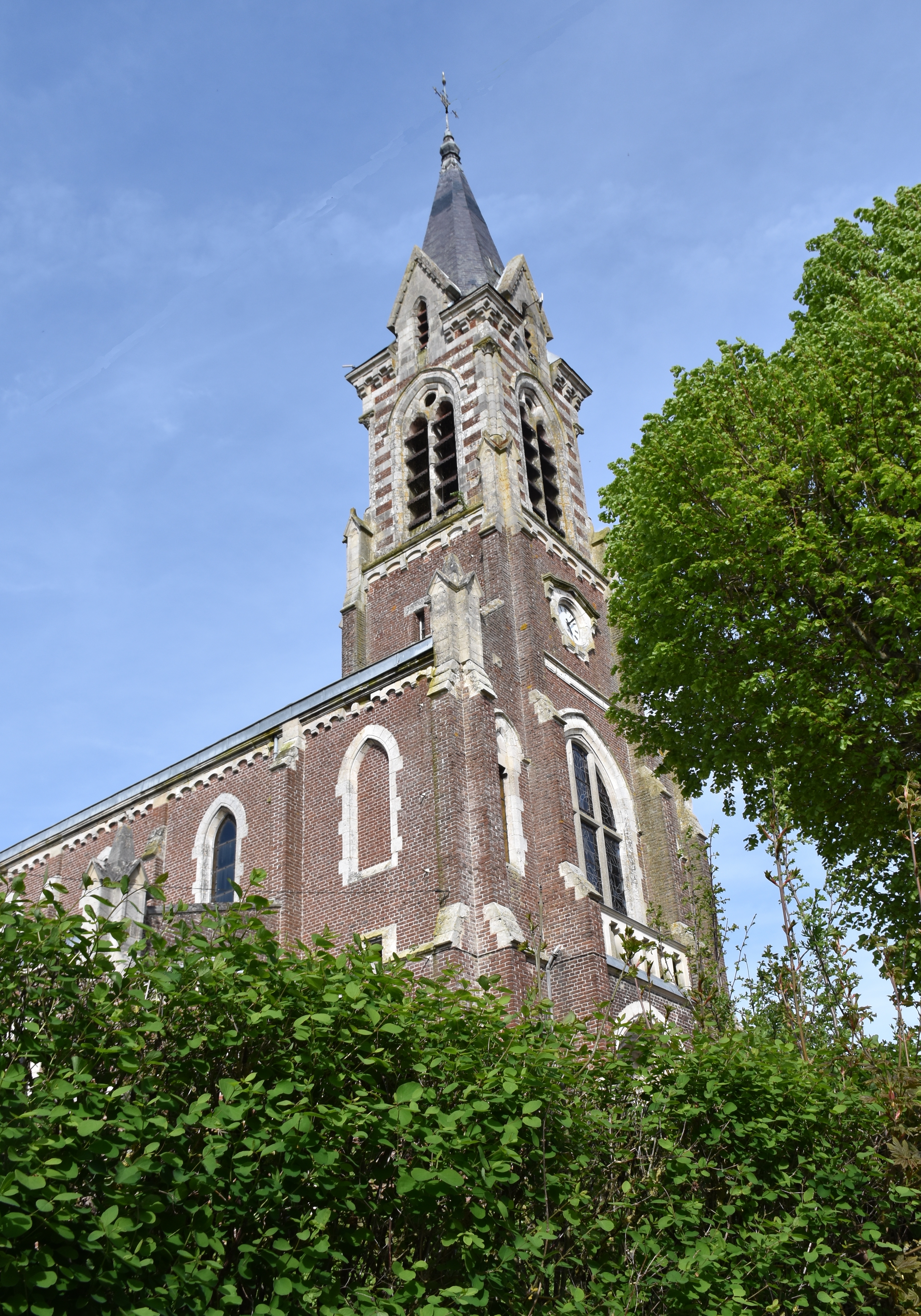
- The church of Marœuil

- Coat of arms
- Location of Marœuil
- Location within France Location within Hauts-de-France
- Coordinates: 50°19′29″N 2°42′23″E
- Country: France
- Region: Hauts-de-France
- Department: Pas-de-Calais
- Arrondissement: Arras
- Canton: Arras-1
- Intercommunality: CU Arras

Government
  - Mayor (2020–2026): Jean-Marie Truffier
- Area^{1}: 11.82 km^{2} (4.56 sq mi)
- Elevation: 65 m (213 ft)
- Highest elevation: 117 m (384 ft)
- Lowest elevation: 58 m (190 ft)
- Population (2023): 2,422
  - Density: 204.9/km^{2} (530.7/sq mi)
- Time zone: UTC+01:00 (CET)
  - Summer (DST): UTC+02:00 (CEST)
- INSEE/Postal code: 62557 /62161
- ^{1} French Land Register data, which excludes lakes, ponds, glaciers > 1 km^{2} (0.386 sq mi or 247 acres) and river estuaries.

Marœuil (French pronunciation: [maʁœj]; West Flemish: Marol) is a commune in the Pas-de-Calais department in the Hauts-de-France region of France.

== Geography ==
Marœuil is a large farming and light industrial village situated 4 miles (6 km) northwest of Arras, at the junction of the D55, D56 and the D60E roads.

== Population ==
Historical population
Year	Pop.	±% p.a.
1968	1,619	—
1975	1,706	+0.75%
1982	1,815	+0.89%
1990	2,296	+2.98%
1999	2,509	+0.99%
2007	2,389	−0.61%
2012	2,452	+0.52%
2017	2,464	+0.10%
2023	2,422	−0.29%
Source: INSEE

== Twin towns ==
- Menden, in Germany

== See also ==
- Communes of the Pas-de-Calais department
