= Dainville =

- Commune
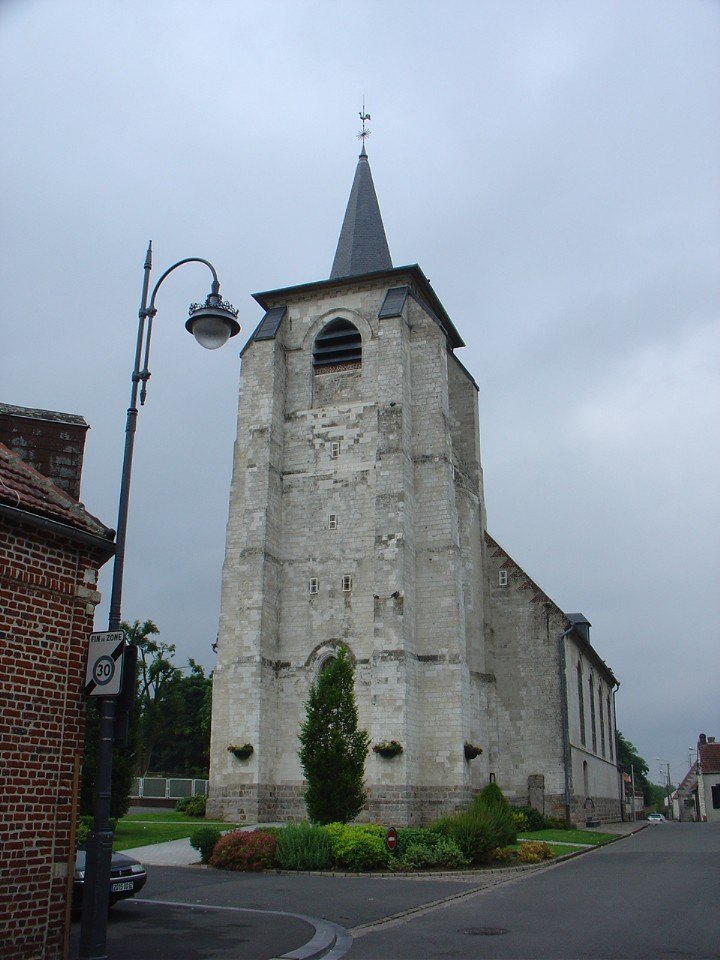
- The church of Dainville

- Coat of arms
- Location of Dainville
- Location within France Location within Hauts-de-France
- Coordinates: 50°16′58″N 2°43′41″E
- Country: France
- Region: Hauts-de-France
- Department: Pas-de-Calais
- Arrondissement: Arras
- Canton: Arras-1
- Intercommunality: CU d'Arras

Government
  - Mayor (2020–2026): Françoise Rossignol
- Area^{1}: 11.22 km^{2} (4.33 sq mi)
- Elevation: 80 m (260 ft)
- Highest elevation: 107 m (351 ft)
- Lowest elevation: 64 m (210 ft)
- Population (2023): 5,683
  - Density: 506.5/km^{2} (1,312/sq mi)
- Time zone: UTC+01:00 (CET)
  - Summer (DST): UTC+02:00 (CEST)
- INSEE/Postal code: 62263 /62000
- ^{1} French Land Register data, which excludes lakes, ponds, glaciers > 1 km^{2} (0.386 sq mi or 247 acres) and river estuaries.

Dainville (French pronunciation: [dɛ̃vil]) is a commune in the Pas-de-Calais department in the Hauts-de-France region of France 2 miles (3.2 km) west of Arras.

== Population ==
Historical population
Year	Pop.	±% p.a.
1968	2,971	—
1975	4,839	+7.22%
1982	5,758	+2.52%
1990	5,693	−0.14%
1999	5,392	−0.60%
2007	5,432	+0.09%
2012	5,825	+1.41%
2017	5,646	−0.62%
2023	5,683	+0.11%
Source: INSEE

== Twin towns ==
Dainville is twinned with the following town:

- (United Kingdom) Whitstable, Kent, England

== See also ==
- Communes of the Pas-de-Calais department
