= Ruapehu =

Ruapehu may refer to:

- Mount Ruapehu, an active volcano, the highest mountain in the North Island of New Zealand
- Ruapehu District, the local government area that covers much land generally west and south of Mount Ruapehu, mostly in the headwaters of the Whanganui River
- SS Ruapehu, a 340-passenger steam ship, built in 1901 and wrecked in 1930. Its main route was London to Auckland and Wellington and back; took the New Zealand Tunnelling Company into war
