= Carrière Wellington =

Museum in France

Coordinates: 50°16′50.1594″N 2°46′58.7274″E

The Carrière Wellington is a museum in Arras, northern France. It is named after a former underground quarry which was part of a network of tunnels used by forces of the British Empire and Commonwealth during the First World War. Opened in March 2008 (18 years ago), the museum commemorates the soldiers who built the tunnels and fought in the Battle of Arras in 1917.

== History ==
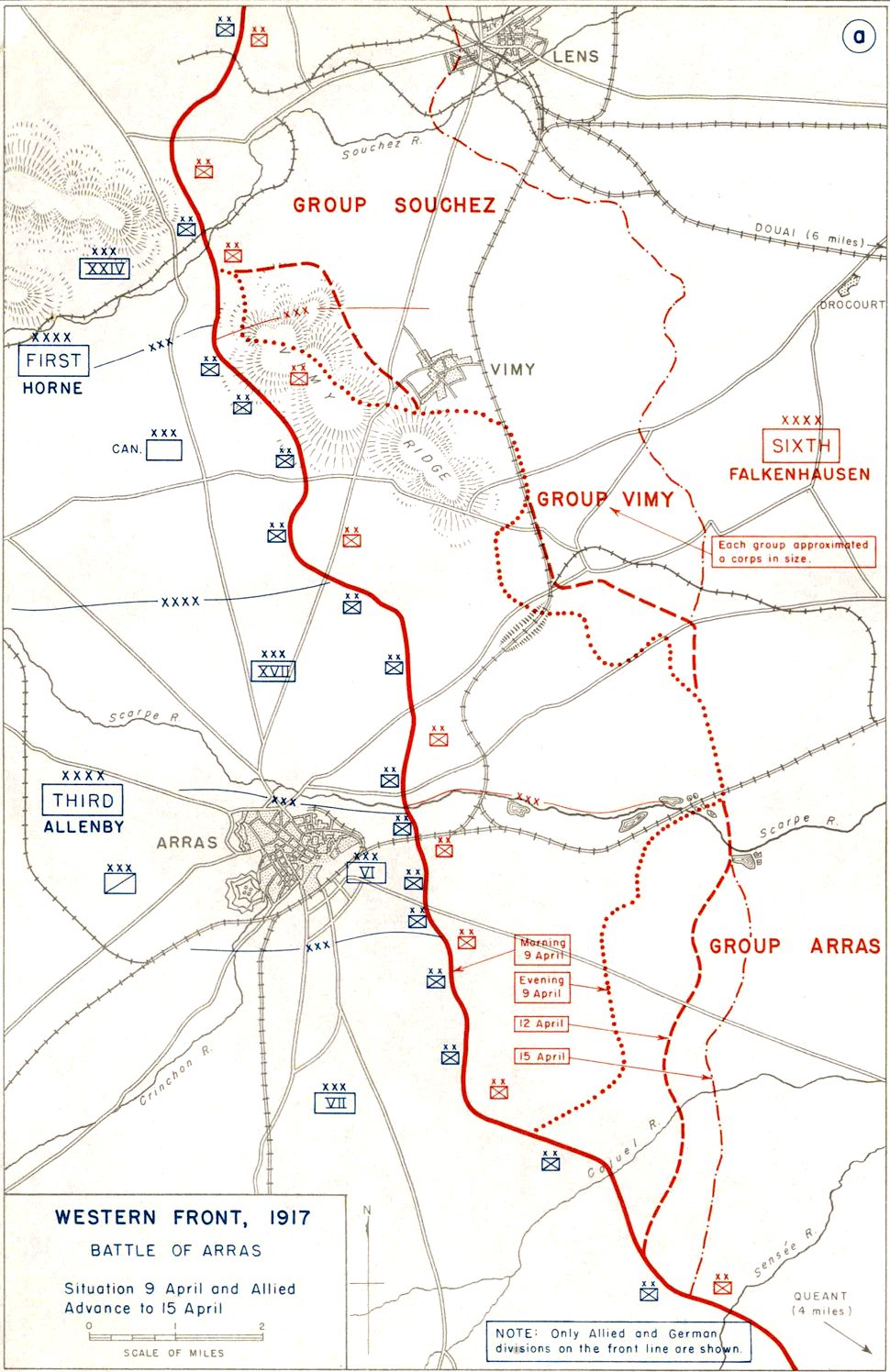
Frontline at Arras immediately prior to the assault.

From the Middle Ages through to the 19th century, the chalk beds underneath Arras were extensively quarried to supply stone for the town's buildings. The quarries fell into disuse by the start of the 20th century. In 1916, during the First World War, the British forces controlling Arras decided to re-use the underground quarries to aid a planned offensive against the Germans, whose trenches ran through what are now the eastern suburbs of the town. The quarries were to be linked up so that they could be used both as shelters from the incessant German shelling and as a means of conveying troops to the front in secrecy and safety.

500 miners from the New Zealand Tunnelling Company, including Māori and Pacific Islanders, recruited from the gold and coal mining districts of the country, were brought in to dig 20 kilometres (12 mi) of tunnels. They worked alongside Royal Engineer tunnelling companies, made up by now of British coal miners and expert tunnellers who had built the London Underground. Many of them were "Bantams", soldiers of below average height who had been rejected from regular units because they did not meet the height requirements; others had been initially rejected as too old, but their specialist mining experience made them essential for the tunnelling operation.

The work was difficult and dangerous. In the New Zealand units alone, 41 tunnellers died and another 151 were injured during countermining operations against the Germans, whose own tunnellers sought to disrupt the Allied tunneling operations. The Arras tunnels linked the quarries to form a network that ran from the town centre, under no man's land, to a number of points just in front of the German front lines. The tunnel system could accommodate 20,000 men and were outfitted with running water, electric lights, kitchens, latrines, a light rail system and a fully equipped hospital. The tunnellers named the individual quarries after their home towns - Auckland, Wellington, Nelson, Blenheim, Christchurch and Dunedin for the New Zealanders, Glasgow, Edinburgh, Crewe and London for the Britons. (For a map of the Arras underground system, see here.)

Thousands of soldiers were billeted in the tunnels for eight days prior to the start of the Arras offensive on 9 April 1917. At 05:30 that morning, exits were dynamited to enable the troops to storm the German trenches. The Germans were taken by surprise and were pushed back 11 km (6.8 mi). This counted as an extraordinary success by the standards of the time. However, the offensive soon bogged down and it was eventually called off after casualties reached 4,000 a day.

During World War II, the tunnels were re-opened to serve as air raid shelters. They were sealed again in 1945 and were largely forgotten until their rediscovery in 1990. Much of the network has now collapsed and most of the rest is extremely unsafe. With the sponsorship of the Arras town council, the regional council and the French state, one section around the Carrière Wellington was restored and converted into a museum at a cost of €4 million.

== Museum ==
The Carrière Wellington museum consists of a visitor centre displaying historic artifacts and presenting the historical context of the Battle of Arras, including the work of the tunnellers and the military strategy that underlay the tunnels' construction. It was opened to the public on 1 March 2008.

The tunnels are accessed via a lift shaft that takes visitors approximately 22 m (70 ft) under the ground inside the galleries of the underground quarry. The tour consists of both guided and audio-guided tours on a planned path accessible for wheelchairs. The visitors discover the development of the strategy of the Battle of Arras, and also the daily life of the tunnelers of New-Zealand and the soldiers of the British Expeditionary Forces sent in these tunnels to prepare this battle.

The site is also a memorial dedicated to the battle of Arras, with a memorial wall remembering all the regiments involved in the battle of Arras. Since the Hundred Years of the battle in 2017, a second memorial wall is dedicated to portraits of NZ Tunnellers, and a statue was installed in the park for the remembrance of these tunnellers. Each year, a ceremony is organised at 6.30 am on April 9.

The museum opened in 2008. Between 2008 and 2013, it has welcomed 45 000 visitors per year. Since 2014, the affluence increased to 70 000 visitors each year.

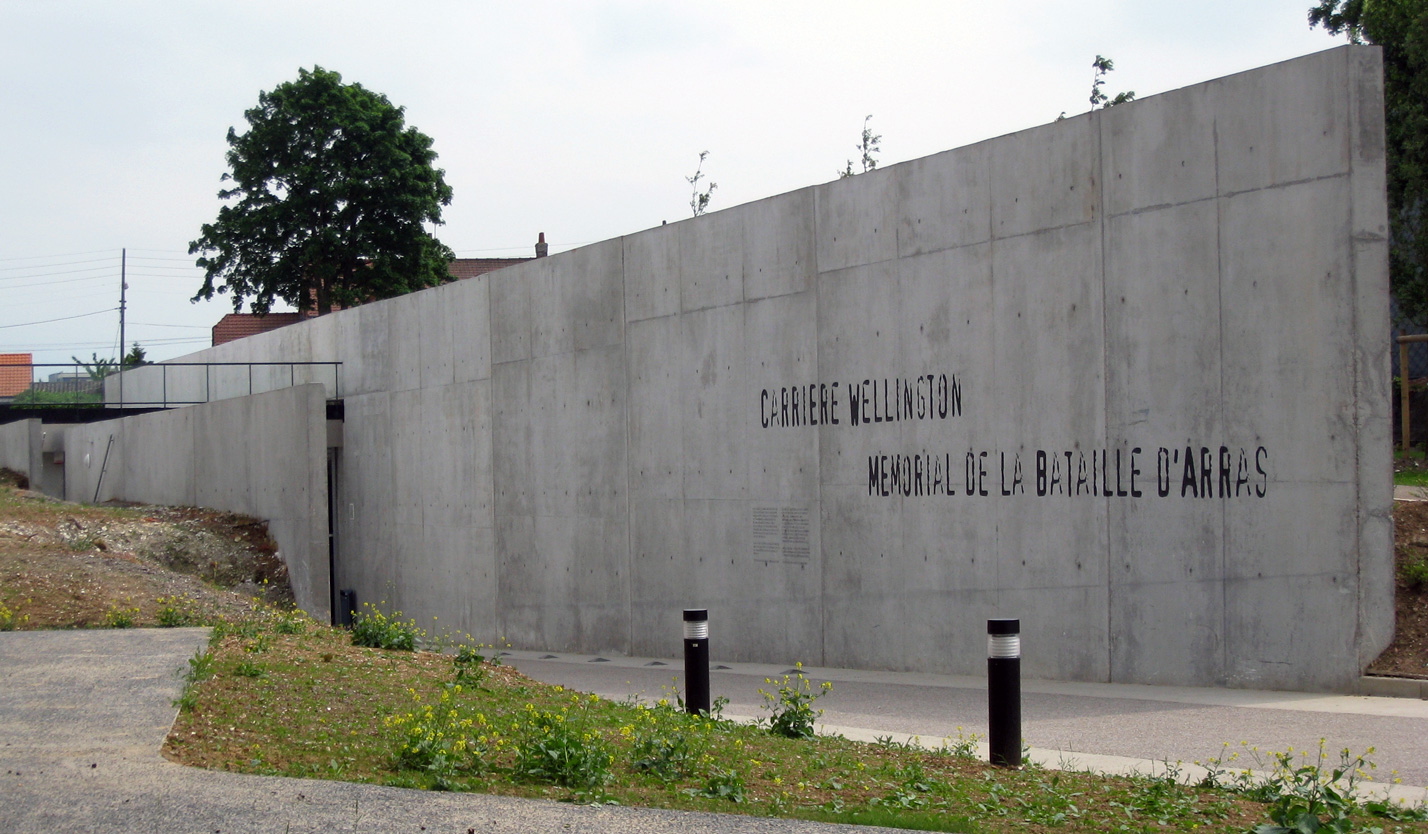
Entrance to the Carrière Wellington museum

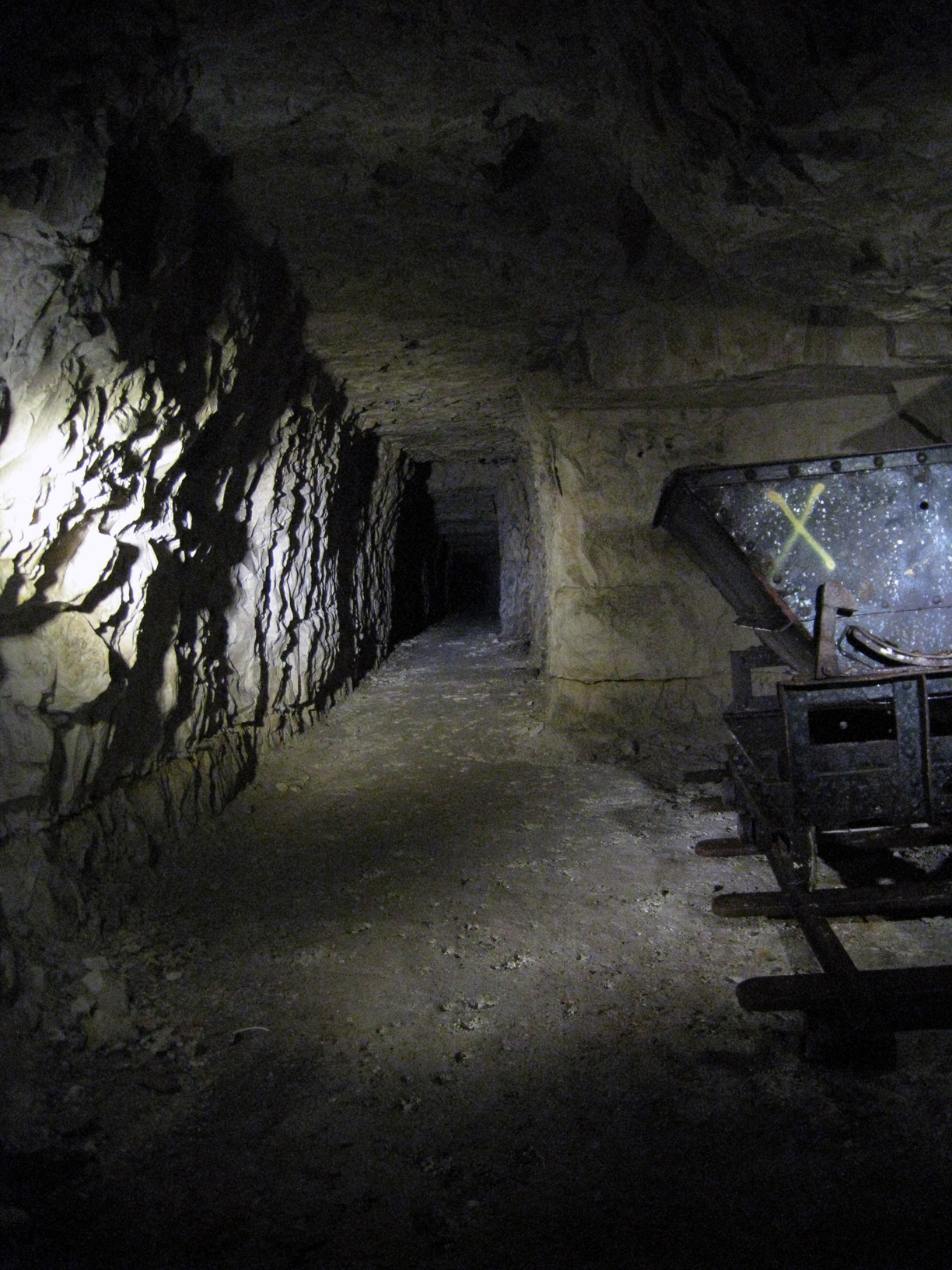
Tunnel and mining trolley in the Carrière Wellington

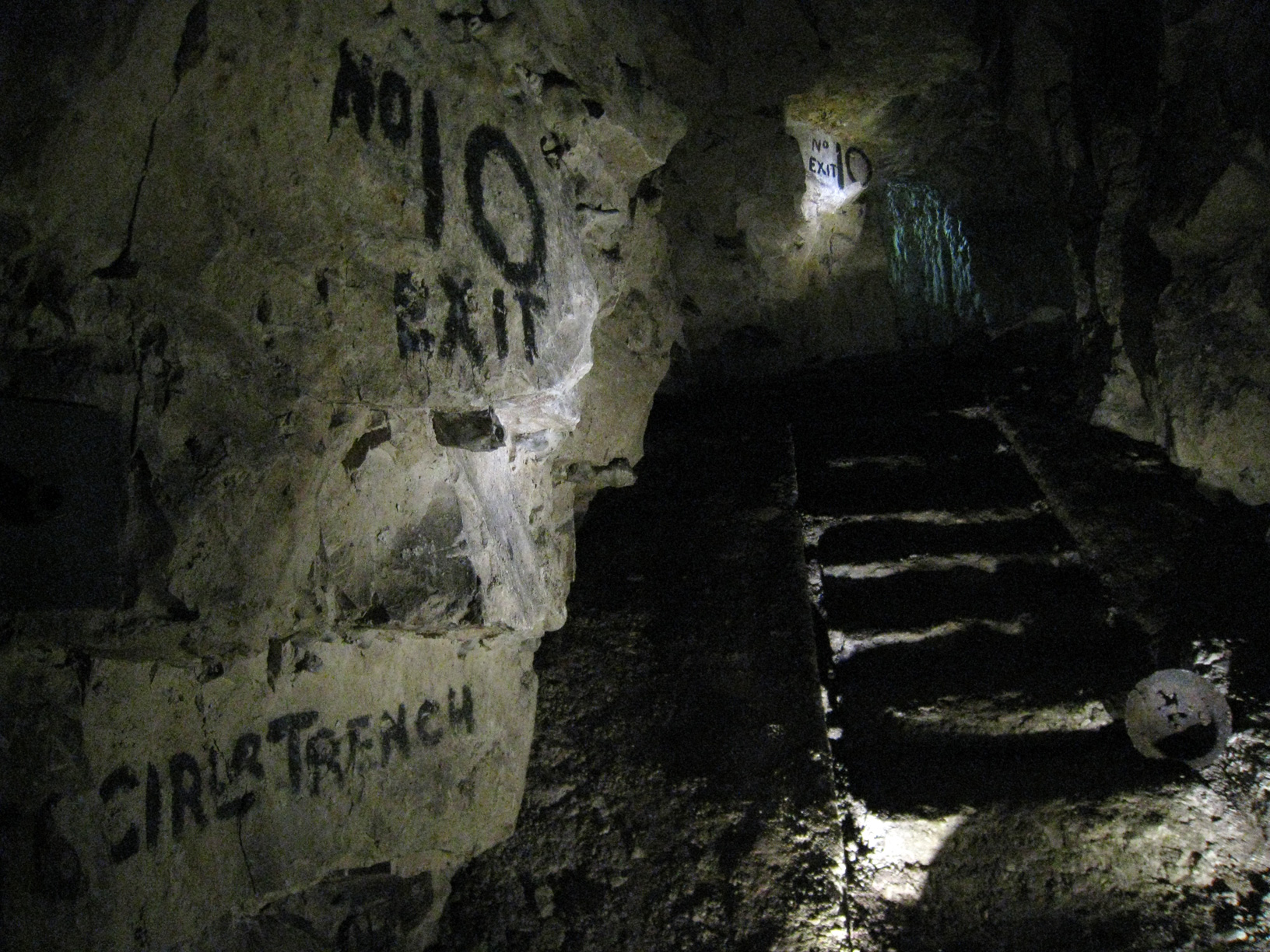
Exit no. 10
