= New Zealand Tunnelling Company =

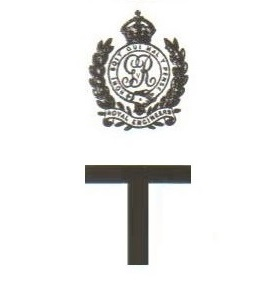
- Active: 1915–19
- Country: New Zealand
- Branch: New Zealand Expeditionary Force
- Type: Royal Engineer tunnelling company
- Role: Military engineering Tunnel warfare
- Nickname: "The Kiwis"
- Engagements: World War I Battle of Arras (1917); German spring offensive Battle of Havrincourt

The New Zealand Tunnelling Company (also New Zealand Engineers Tunnelling Company) was a tunnel warfare unit of the Royal New Zealand Engineers during World War I which specialised in sapping and mining. The tunnelling companies were occupied in offensive and defensive mining involving the placing and maintaining of mines under enemy lines, as well as other underground work such as the construction of deep dugouts for troop accommodation, the digging of subways, saps (a narrow trench dug to approach enemy trenches), cable trenches and underground chambers for signals and medical services. The unit is particularly known for its role at Carrière Wellington and during the Battle of Arras.

== Background ==
By January 1915 it had become evident to the BEF at the Western Front that the Germans were mining to a planned system. As the British had failed to develop suitable counter-tactics or underground listening devices before the war, field marshals French and Kitchener agreed to investigate the suitability of forming British mining units. Following consultations between the Engineer-in-Chief of the BEF, Brigadier George Fowke, and the mining specialist John Norton-Griffiths, the War Office formally approved the tunnelling company scheme on 19 February 1915.

Norton-Griffiths ensured that tunnelling companies numbers 170 to 177 were ready for deployment in mid-February 1915. In the spring of that year, there was constant underground fighting in the Ypres Salient at Hooge, Hill 60, Railway Wood, Sanctuary Wood, St Eloi and The Bluff which required the deployment of new drafts of tunnellers for several months after the formation of the first eight companies. The lack of suitably experienced men led to some tunnelling companies starting work later than others. The number of units available to the BEF was also restricted by the need to provide effective counter-measures to the German mining activities. To make the tunnels safer and quicker to deploy, the British Army enlisted experienced coal miners, many outside their nominal recruitment policy. The first nine companies, numbers 170 to 178, were each commanded by a regular Royal Engineers officer. These companies each comprised 5 officers and 269 sappers; they were aided by additional infantrymen who were temporarily attached to the tunnellers as required, which almost doubled their numbers. The success of the first tunnelling companies formed under Norton-Griffiths' command led to mining being made a separate branch of the Engineer-in-Chief's office under Major-General S.R. Rice, and the appointment of an 'Inspector of Mines' at the GHQ Saint-Omer office of the Engineer-in-Chief. A second group of tunnelling companies were formed from Welsh miners from the 1st and 3rd Battalions of the Monmouthshire Regiment, who were attached to the 1st Northumberland Field Company of the Royal Engineers, which was a Territorial unit. The formation of twelve new tunnelling companies, between July and October 1915, helped to bring more men into action in other parts of the Western Front. Most British tunnelling companies were formed under Norton-Griffiths' leadership during 1915, and one more was added in 1916.

On 10 September 1915, the British government sent an appeal to Canada, South Africa, Australia and New Zealand to raise tunnelling companies in the Dominions of the British Empire. On 17 September, New Zealand became the first Dominion to agree the formation of a tunnelling unit. The Royal Australian Engineers formed four mining units for the British Expeditionary Force, all of which were operational by March 1916. Three were specialist companies of tunnellers (1st, 2nd, 3rd), while the Australian Electrical Mechanical Boring and Mining Company was tasked with carrying out related repairs. A Canadian tunnelling unit was formed from men on the battlefield, plus two other companies trained in Canada and then shipped to France, resulting in 30 tunnelling companies being available by the summer of 1916.

== Unit history ==
=== Formation ===
After New Zealand had become the first Dominion to agree the formation of a Royal Engineer tunnelling company on 17 September 1915, the government encouraged early enlistment to form the New Zealand Mining Corps. On 11 October, specialist tunnellers' training began on the Avondale Racecourse near Auckland. The tunnelling company numbered 16 engineering officers and 407 other ranks, plus one officer and two men from the Medical Corps, 19 men from the New Zealand Army Service Corps, and one man from the New Zealand Army Pay Corps, a total of 446 soldiers. On 18 December 1915, the men of the New Zealand Tunnelling Company left Auckland on board the SS Ruapehu. After stop-overs in Montevideo and Dakar, the ship arrived at Plymouth on 3 February 1916. After further training in England, the unit was deployed to northern France.

=== Vimy ===
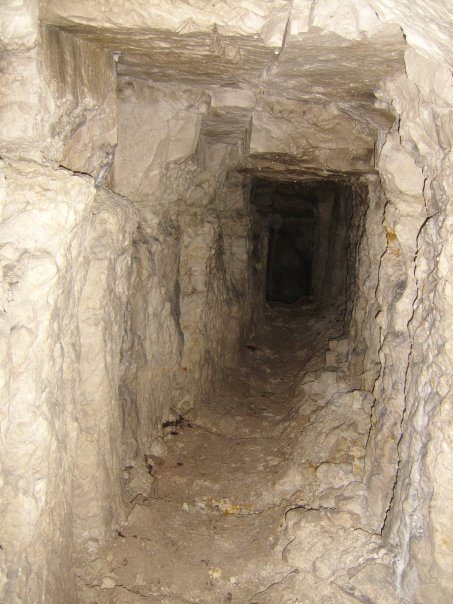
British-dug fighting tunnel in Vimy sector

On 10 March 1916, the New Zealand tunnellers arrived in Le Havre, becoming the first New Zealand soldiers on the Western Front. Five days later they relieved the French 7/1 compagnie d'ingénieurs territoriaux in the "Labyrinth" sector of the Western Front between Roclincourt and Écurie in northern France. The German "Labyrinth" stronghold was located near Neuville-Saint-Vaast, between Arras and Vimy and not far from Notre Dame de Lorette. On 29 March 1916, the New Zealand Tunnelling Company exchanged position with the 185th Tunnelling Company and moved to Roclincourt-Chantecler, a kilometre south of their old sector. On 7 April, the tunneling units of the German Army carried out their first underground offensive against the New Zealand Tunnelling Company. On 5 May, the New Zealanders responded by firing four mines under the German lines, which marked the first offensive underground action of the unit. During summer and much of autumn 1916, the unit further developed and expanded its mining to create an effective underground defence at Roclincourt-Chantecler. The unit seems to have shared the Neuville-Saint-Vaast sector with the 176th Tunnelling Company, which had moved to Neuville-Saint-Vaast in April 1916 and remained there for a considerable time, and the 172nd Tunnelling Company, which was relieved in this area by the 2nd Australian Tunnelling Company in May 1916.

=== Arras 1916/17 ===
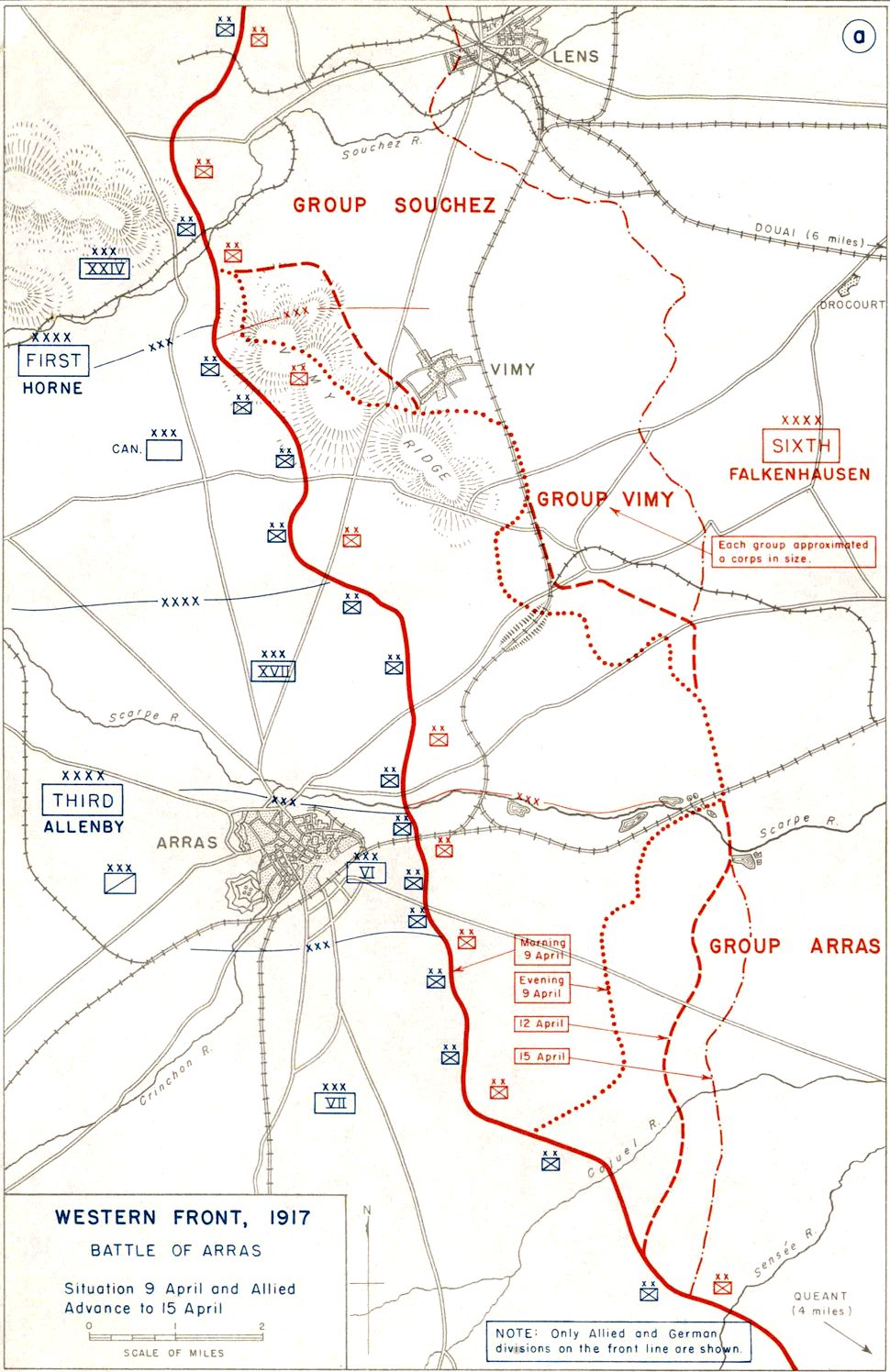
Front line at Arras immediately prior to the assault.

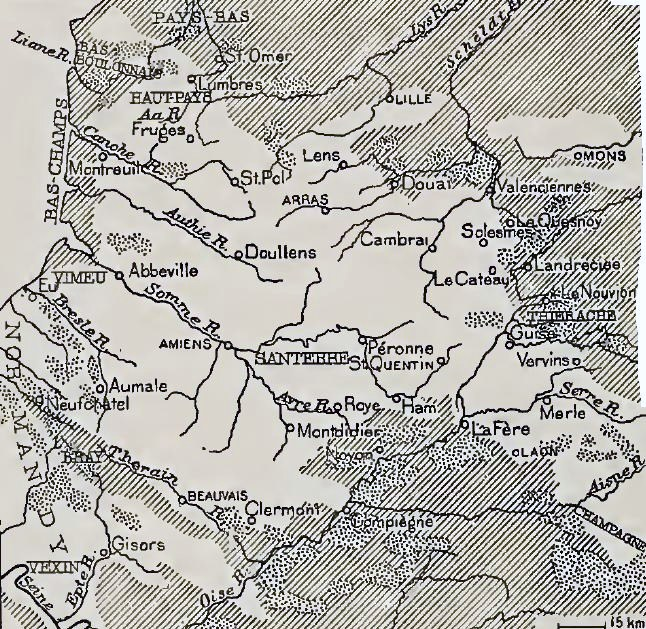
Map of chalk areas in northern France

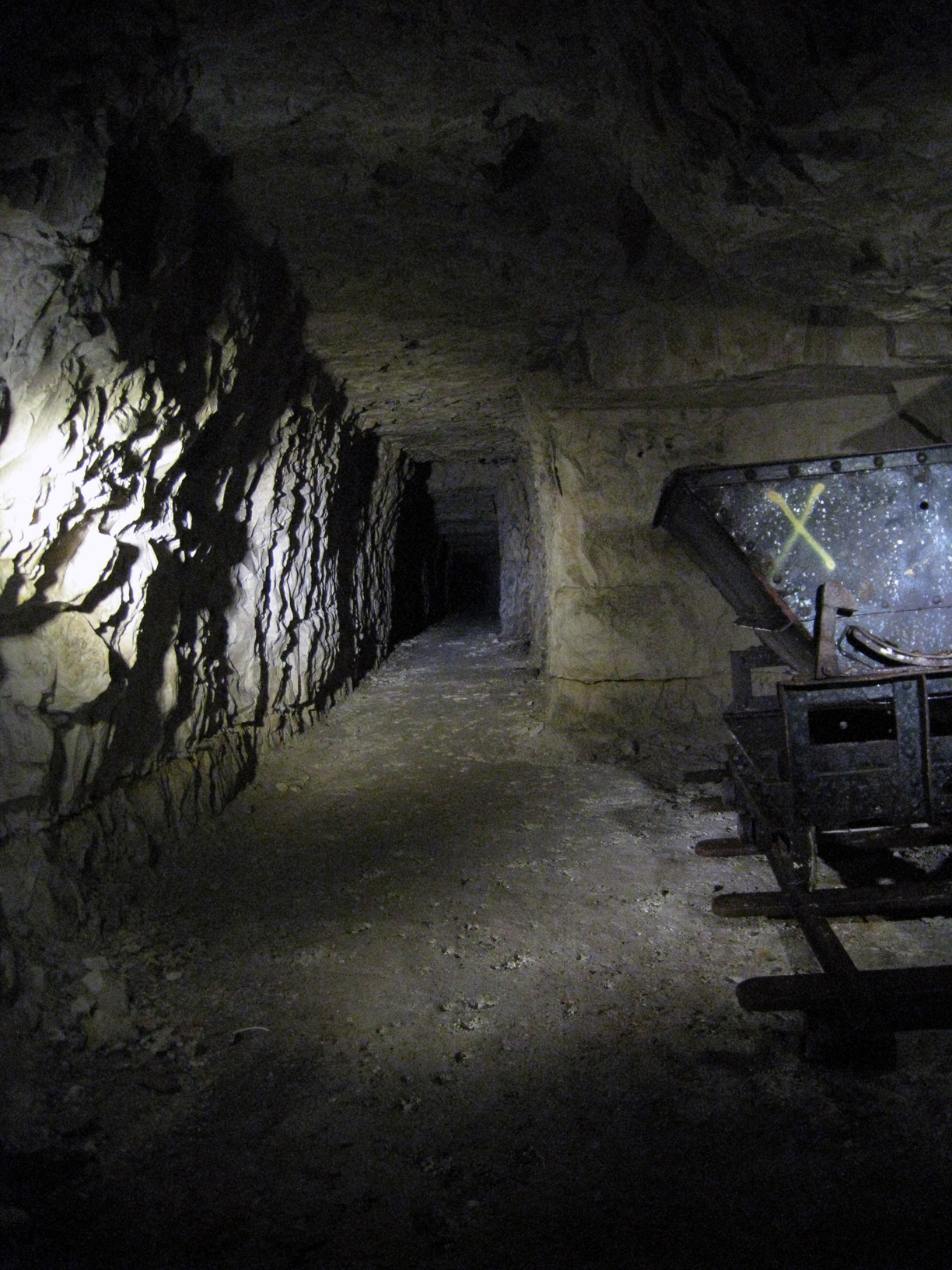
Tunnel and mining trolley in Carrière Wellington

On 15 November 1916, the New Zealand Tunnelling Company ended its offensive mining operations and started preparations for the Battle of Arras (9 April – 16 May 1917). Henry Armytage Sanders was sent to France and met up with the New Zealand Tunnelling Company on 8 April 1917. Sanders took all the NZEF historical photographs and designated these with serial numbers in the H series. He remained with the NZEF until January 1919, went back to England to be discharged on 8 March 1919.

The British forces controlling Arras had decided to re-use the ancient underground quarries in the town to aid a planned offensive against the Germans, whose trenches ran through what are now the eastern suburbs of the town. The underground quarries were to be linked up by tunnels so that they could be used both as shelters from the incessant German shelling and as a means of conveying troops to the front in secrecy and safety. From October 1916, the tunnelling companies of the Royal Engineers had been constructing tunnels for the troops, including Carrière Wellington, a former underground quarry in Ronville near Arras. The New Zealand Tunnelling Company had carried out a first exploration of the underground quarries in the Ronville and Saint-Sauveur districts of Arras on 5 November 1916. (For a map of the Arras underground system, see here.)

While the New Zealanders were moving into place, the 184th Tunnelling Company began work on connection tunnels at Saint-Sauveur on 25 November 1916. Shortly afterwards, on 9 December 1916, 43 Māoris of the Māori Pioneer Battalion joined the New Zealand Tunnelling Company at Carrière Wellington. The Arras region is chalky and therefore easily excavated; under Arras itself is a vast network (called the boves) of caverns, underground quarries, galleries and sewage tunnels. The engineers devised a plan to add new tunnels to this network so that troops could arrive at the battlefield in secrecy and in safety. The scale of this undertaking was enormous: in one sector alone four Tunnelling Companies (of 500 men each) worked around the clock in 18-hour shifts for two months. The work was difficult and dangerous. In the New Zealand Tunnelling Company alone, 41 tunnellers died and another 151 were injured during counter-mining operations against the Germans, whose own tunnellers sought to disrupt the Allied tunneling operations.

The tunnellers named the individual quarries after their home towns (Auckland, Wellington, Nelson, Blenheim, Christchurch, Russell and Dunedin for the New Zealanders, and Glasgow, Edinburgh, Crewe and London for the Britons). Assault tunnels were also dug, stopping a few metres short of the German line, ready to be blown open by explosives on the first day of the battle. On 4 January 1917, the unit started putting in electricity in the Ronville quarries. Two weeks later, most of the work on the connection tunnels in the Ronville underground system was complete. On 24 January, the New Zealand Tunnelling Company began installing direction signs in the underground system. The next day, they started early works to organise a tramway line into the Ronville and Saint-Sauveur systems. By that time, the tunnelling companies of the Royal Engineers had constructed 20 kilometres of tunnels, graded as subways (foot traffic only), tramways (with rails for hand-drawn trolleys, for taking ammunition to the line and bringing casualties back from it) and railways (a light railway system). The tunnel system could accommodate 24,000 men and was equipped with running water, electric light, kitchens, latrines, a small power station and a medical centre with a fully equipped operating theatre. In addition to this, conventional mines were laid under the front lines, ready to be blown immediately before the assault. In the meantime, German sappers were actively conducting their own underground operations, seeking out Allied tunnels to assault and counter-mine. On 14–16 March 1917, the German withdrawal on the Hindenburg Line (Siegfried Stellung) made it impossible to attack from the Ronville system. Despite this setback, electricity was installed and tested in the whole system beneath Arras by 3 April 1917, ready for the start of the Battle of Arras on 9 April. On the first day of the battle, the New Zealand Tunnelling Company opened three tunnels located at the end of Saint-Sauveur system, allowing infantrymen to appear suddenly in the German trenches. Owing to the German withdrawal from their front line south-east of Arras, the unit also fired the only mine that was used on the Arras front on 9 April. It was located to the north-east at Blagny, and was a 1,000-kilogram (2,200 lb) charge, blown by the New Zealand Tunnelling Company at zero, 5.30 a.m. It destroyed two German dugouts, 46 metres (50 yd) of trench and a concrete pillbox. However, it also stunned and apparently buried some members of the 13th Royal Scots and impeded their assault temporarily.

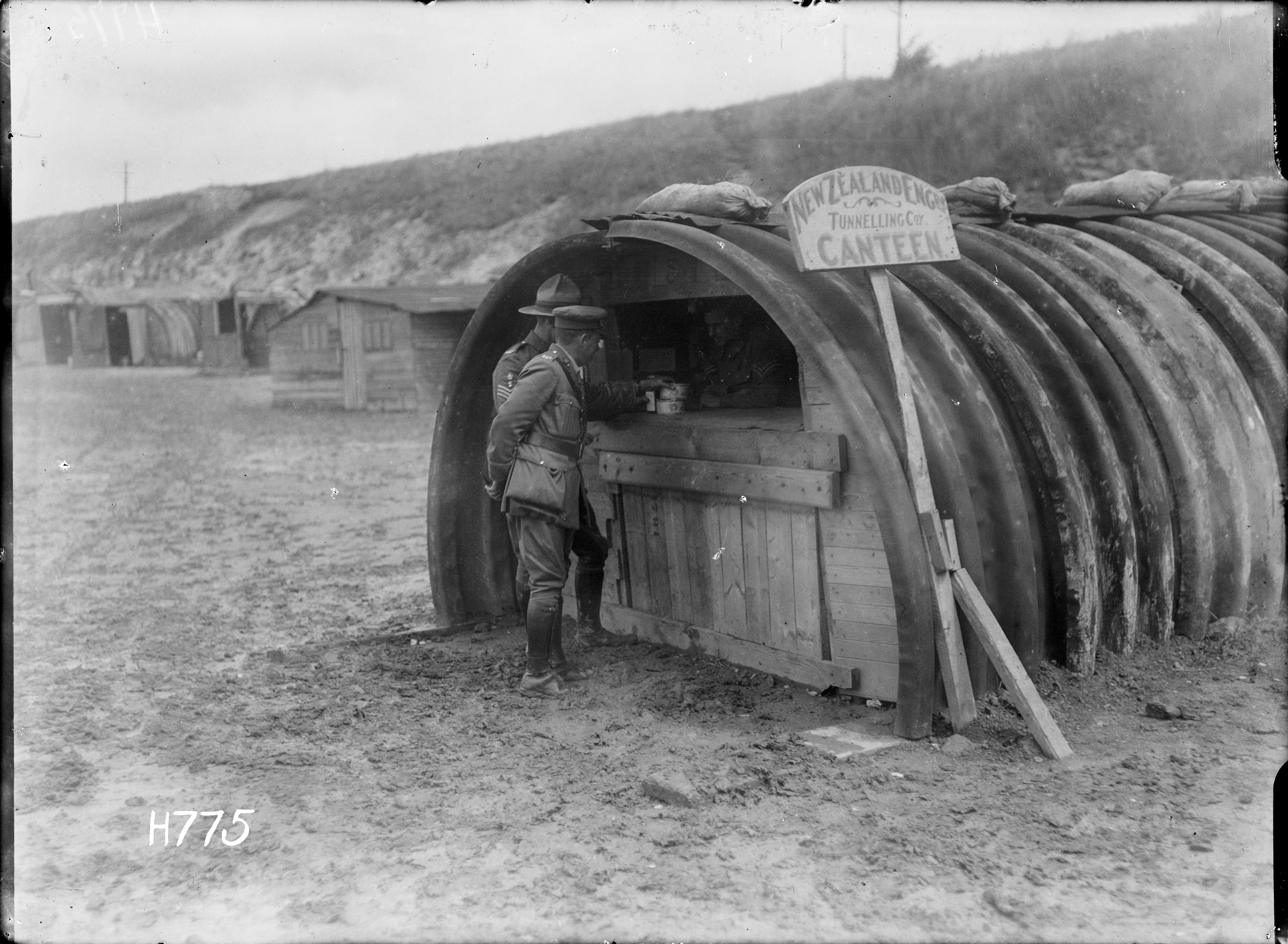
Officer and NCO purchasing items at the New Zealand Tunnelling Company's canteen at Dainville in July 1918.

On 5 May 1917, the New Zealand Tunnelling Company began early development of tunnels beneath German trenches located between Gavrelle and Roeux east of Arras. After the end of the Battle of Arras in May 1917, the unit focused mainly on creating deep dugouts beneath British trenches, which was continued into the winter months. On 5 November 1917, the unit witnessed the explosion of a damage ammunition stock at Wanquetin, some 7.5 miles (12.1 km) west of Arras.

=== Spring Offensive ===
On 21 March 1918, the New Zealand Tunnelling Company was present at Arras during the large German spring offensive, and began work on trenches south-west of the town. From May to July, the unit returned to constructing underground shelters beneath the British trenches. The unit stayed in Arras until 14 July.

=== Somme ===
On 15 July 1918, the New Zealand Tunnelling Company arrived at Marieux on the Somme, where it began constructing dug-outs beneath the British trenches. On 20 August, the unit ended its underground works in the sector.

=== Havrincourt ===
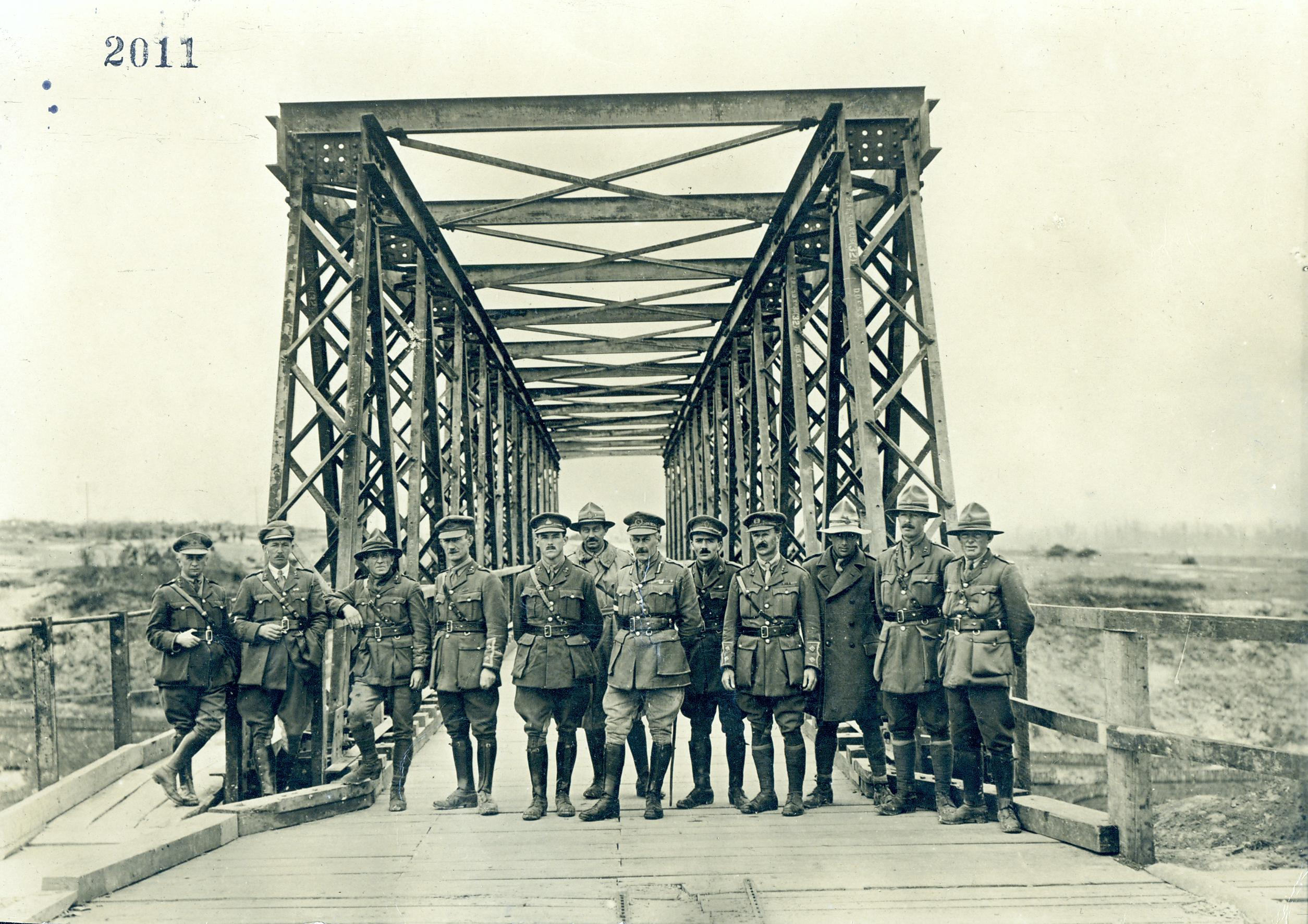
Officers of the New Zealand Tunnelling Company pose at the completed Hermies–Havrincourt bridge over the Canal du Nord, October 1918.

The New Zealand Tunnelling Company was next involved in the Battle of Havrincourt, opening on 12 September 1918, which began the German retreat back to the Belgian border. On 27 September the company was joined by 565th (Wiltshire) Army Troops Company, RE, recruited from railwaymen and specially trained in building heavy bridges. This company had already suffered severe casualties building a ramp down the face of a retaining wall into the dry Canal du Nord. Now, under VI Corps Troops RE, the two companies (14 officers and 310 men in total) built a Hopkins steel bridge across the canal between Hermies and Havrincourt. This was the largest heavy steel bridge erected on the Western Front during the war, with a span of 180 feet (55 m) above a 100 feet (30 m) deep gap; in total the bridge was 240 feet (73 m) long, launched by rollers. It took 80 three-ton lorry loads to bring up the material, and the total time to unload and erect the bridge was 104 hours. It was opened for traffic on 2 October and completed on 5 October.

In the autumn of 1918, the unit constructed further military bridges that allowed the Allied troops to cross three main river obstacles: the Canal de l'Escaut, crossing Cambrai and going to the Canal de Saint-Quentin on the south, the Selle and the Ecaillon, two parallel rivers, separated from only two or three miles, in the southwest of Quesnoy. The New Zealand Tunnelling Company reinstalled the communication roads and railways above natural obstacles at Noyelles-sur-Escaut, Masnières, Cambrai, Solesmes, Saint-Waast and Romeries.

=== Armistice ===
After the Armistice of 11 November 1918, the New Zealand Tunnelling Company stayed in France until the demobilisation of the first New Zealand tunnellers began in early December. On 30 January 1919, the unit arrived in Great Britain, from where the soldiers left for home on 14 March. On 23 April, the last men of the New Zealand Tunnelling Company arrived in Auckland. The next day, the unit was formally dissolved.

== See also ==
- Mine warfare
