= Blagny =

Commune in France

- Commune
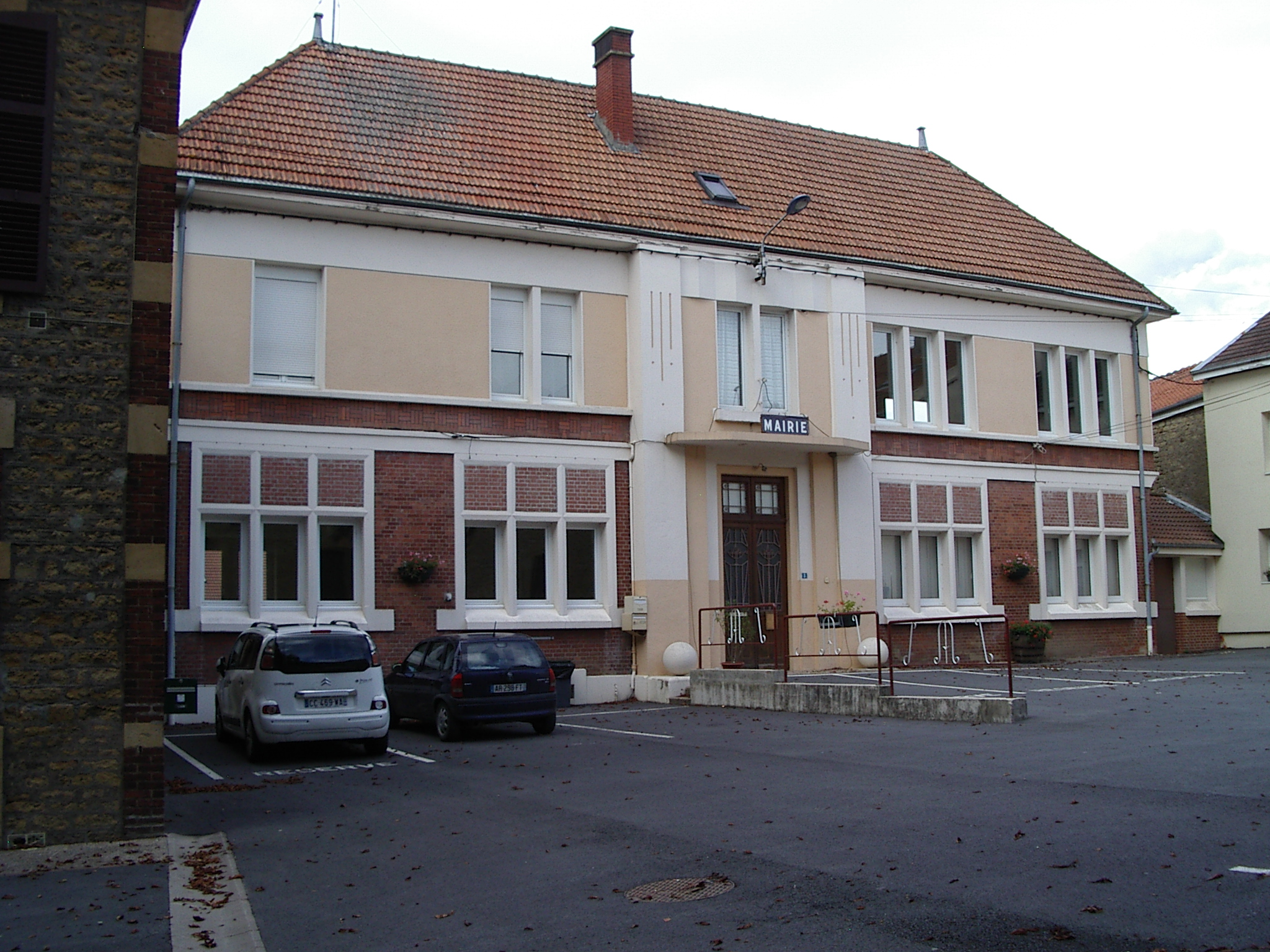
- The town hall in Blagny

- Coat of arms
- Location of Blagny
- Location within France Location within Grand Est
- Coordinates: 49°37′18″N 5°11′31″E
- Country: France
- Region: Grand Est
- Department: Ardennes
- Arrondissement: Sedan
- Canton: Carignan
- Intercommunality: Portes du Luxembourg

Government
  - Mayor (2020–2026): Théodor Lukowski
- Area^{1}: 7.42 km^{2} (2.86 sq mi)
- Elevation: 165 m (541 ft)
- Highest elevation: 280 m (920 ft)
- Lowest elevation: 162 m (531 ft)
- Population (2023): 1,078
  - Density: 145/km^{2} (376/sq mi)
- Time zone: UTC+01:00 (CET)
  - Summer (DST): UTC+02:00 (CEST)
- INSEE/Postal code: 08067 /08110
- ^{1} French Land Register data, which excludes lakes, ponds, glaciers > 1 km^{2} (0.386 sq mi or 247 acres) and river estuaries.

Blagny (French pronunciation: [blaɲi]) is a commune in the Ardennes department in northern France. It is around 7 km from the Belgian border, and around 20 km south-east of Sedan.

== Population ==
Historical population
Year	Pop.	±% p.a.
1968	1,745	—
1975	1,801	+0.45%
1982	1,393	−3.60%
1990	1,382	−0.10%
1999	1,259	−1.03%
2007	1,230	−0.29%
2012	1,208	−0.36%
2017	1,190	−0.30%
2023	1,078	−1.63%
Source: INSEE

== See also ==
- Communes of the Ardennes department
