= Second Battle of Artois =

1915 Allied offensive, World War I

- Part of The Western Front of the First World War
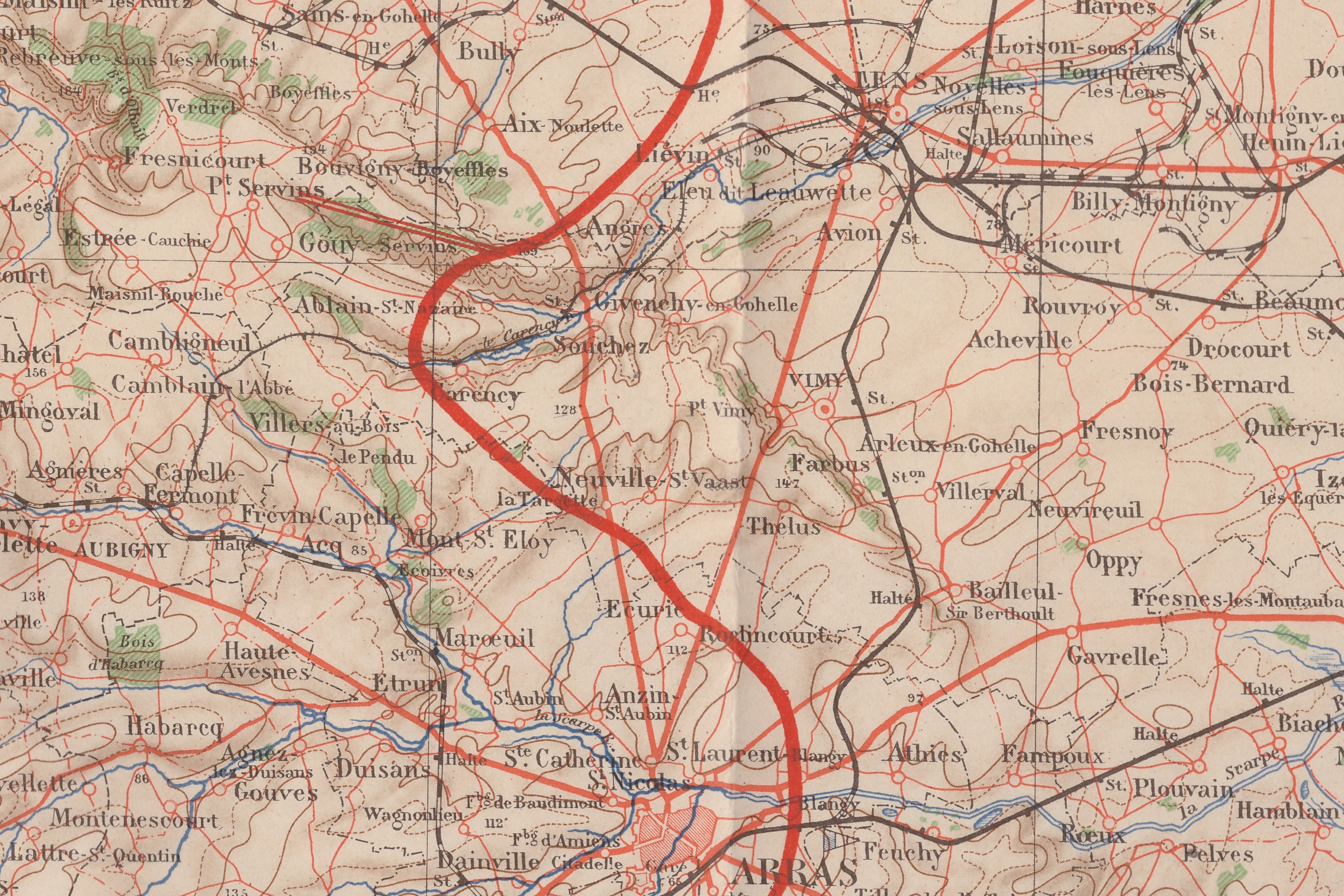
- Western Front, Artois: Arras sector, January 1915
Date	9 May – 18 June 1915
Location	Artois, France 50°30′N 2°45′E
Result	See Aftermath section
Territorial changes	French regain 6 mi^{2} (16 km^{2}); British advance 1.9 mi (3.1 km) at Festubert

Belligerents
France; British Empire; United Kingdom; Canada; India	German Empire

Commanders and leaders
(French Third Republic) Joseph Joffre; (French Third Republic) Victor d'Urbal; (British Empire) Douglas Haig	(German Empire) (Kingdom of Bavaria) Crown Prince Rupprecht

Strength
9 French and British divisions (initial); 20 divisions (final)	18 divisions (final)

Casualties and losses
French: 102,500; British: 27,809 (Aubers Ridge: 11,161, Festubert: 16,648)	Germany: 73,072
- Artois, a region of northern France including the cities of Arras, Saint-Omer, Lens and Béthune.

The Second Battle of Artois (French: Deuxième bataille de l'Artois, German: Lorettoschlacht) from 9 May to 18 June 1915, took place on the Western Front during the First World War. (Note: The province of Artois had been abolished during the French revolution and was replaced by the Départments of Somme and Pas de Calais but in French and British army nomenclature the term remained.) A German-held salient from Reims to Amiens had been formed in 1914 which menaced communications between Paris and the unoccupied parts of northern France. A reciprocal French advance eastwards in Artois could cut the rail lines supplying the German armies between Arras and Reims. French operations in Artois, Champagne and Alsace from November–December 1914, led General Joseph Joffre, Generalissimo (Commander in Chief) and head of Grand Quartier Général (GQG), to continue the offensive in Champagne against the German southern rail supply route and to plan an offensive in Artois against the lines from Germany supplying the German armies in the north.

Field Marshal Sir John French, commander of the British Expeditionary Force (BEF), co-operated with the French strategy to capture Vimy Ridge by planning British attacks against Aubers Ridge. The attacks would confront the German 6th Army with a joint offensive, on a 70 mi (110 km) front, eastwards into the Douai plain, where an advance of 10–15 mi (16–24 km) would cut the railways supplying the German armies as far south as Reims. The French attacked Vimy Ridge and the British attacked further north in the Battle of Aubers Ridge (9 May) and the Battle of Festubert (15–25 May).

The battle was fought during the German offensive of the Second Battle of Ypres (21 April – 25 May), which the Germans ended to reinforce the Artois front. The initial French attack broke through and captured Vimy Ridge, to the surprise of both sides. German counter-attacks forced them back about half-way to their jumping-off points before French reserves could reach the battlefield. The British attack at Aubers Ridge was a costly failure and two German divisions in reserve were diverted south against the Tenth Army. The British offensive was suspended until 15 May, when the Battle of Festubert began and French attacks from 15 May to 15 June were concentrated on the flanks to create jumping-off points for a second general offensive, which began on 16 June.

The British attacks at Festubert forced the Germans back 1.9 mi (3 km) and diverted reserves from the French but the Tenth Army gained little more ground, despite firing double the amount of artillery ammunition and many more casualties on both sides. On 18 June, the main offensive was stopped and local French attacks were ended on 25 June. The French had regained 6.2 sq mi (16 km^{2}) of territory but their failure to capture Vimy Ridge, despite the expenditure of 2,155,862 shells and the suffering of 102,500 casualties, led to recriminations against Joffre. The defence of the ridge cost the German 6th Army 73,072 casualties. A lull in the area followed until the Third Battle of Artois in September.

== Background ==
=== Strategic developments ===
After the Marne campaign in 1914, French offensives in Artois, Champagne and at St Mihiel had been costly failures, leading to criticism of the leadership of General Joseph Joffre, within the army and the French government. The French President, Raymond Poincaré, arranged several meetings between Joffre and the Council of Ministers (Conseil des ministres) in March and April 1915, where reports of the failed operations were debated, particularly a condemnation of the April offensive against the St Mihiel salient. Joffre retained undivided command and freedom to conduct operations as he saw fit, which had been given at the beginning of the war but was instructed to consult with his subordinates; provisional army groups, which had been established in late 1914, were made permanent soon afterwards. The French government accepted that the task facing Joffre and the army was far more difficult than expected, after the winter fighting in Artois and Champagne. Despite costly mistakes, many lessons had been learned, methods had been changed and more weapons and equipment necessary for siege warfare had been delivered. The offensives had failed in their objectives but had become more powerful and better organised, except for the bungled effort at St Mihiel. The greater amount of heavy artillery gave grounds for confidence that further attacks could break the German front and liberate France.

In late 1914, General Erich Von Falkenhayn, Chief of the General Staff Oberste Heeresleitung (OHL) of the German army since 14 September, had reinforced the 4th Army and attacked westwards, parallel to the North Sea coast, culminating in the Battle of the Yser (16–31 October 1914) and the First Battle of Ypres (19 October – 22 November), when open warfare in the west ended. Eight new divisions were formed in February 1915 and another fourteen in April, which were formed into a new 11th Army, intended for an offensive in France. Despite the French battle in Champagne in February, Falkenhayn was forced to cancel his plans to attack in the west and send the 11th Army to the Eastern Front, to support the Austro-Hungarian army, which has suffered more than 2,000,000 casualties by March 1915. (Note: The Austro-German forces in the east began the Gorlice–Tarnów Offensive (1 May – 19 September) which achieved great success but did not decisively defeat the Russian army.) Nine divisions were transferred to Russia in May, which reduced the Westheer (Western Army) to 97 divisions against 110–112 larger French, British and Belgian divisions. The Westheer had c. 4,000 modern and 350 obsolete field guns, 825 modern and 510 obsolete heavy guns and ten super-heavy howitzers. A reserve of 276 heavy guns and mortars was also being prepared. OHL had 7 1/2 divisions in reserve, with the 58th Division and the 115th Division behind the 6th Army. Indications of an attack in Artois had been detected but not signs of a general offensive on the Western Front.

The Westheer was forced to remain on the defensive, except for limited attacks in Flanders, in the Second Battle of Ypres (21 April – 25 May) and in the Argonne, west of Verdun, until August to cut the main rail line from Paris to Verdun. In memoranda issued on 7 and 25 January 1915, Falkenhayn ordered that the positions of the German armies in France were to be fortified to resist attacks with only small forces, to enable reserves to be sent to Russia. Should part of the front line be lost, it was to be retaken by counter-attack. Behind the line, new defences were to be built and connected by communication trenches, to delay a further attack until reserves could be assembled for a counter-attack. Opposing reinforcements were to be obstructed by a shell-barrage (Geschoss-schleier). On 4 May, Falkenhayn reiterated the need to improve reserve positions and also to build a rear position about 1.2–1.9 mi (2–3 km) behind the front line. During 1915, the German armies on the Western Front increased the front line from one to three trenches, built a second trench system 1,500–3,000 yd (0.85–1.70 mi; 1.4–2.7 km) behind the front line and developed the defensive use of machine-guns and artillery, to restrict an attack to a bend (Ausbeulung) in the line. The Franco-British offensives in 1915 found the German defences in a state of continuous development, the building programme taking time to complete, due to a shortage of labour.

=== Tactical developments ===
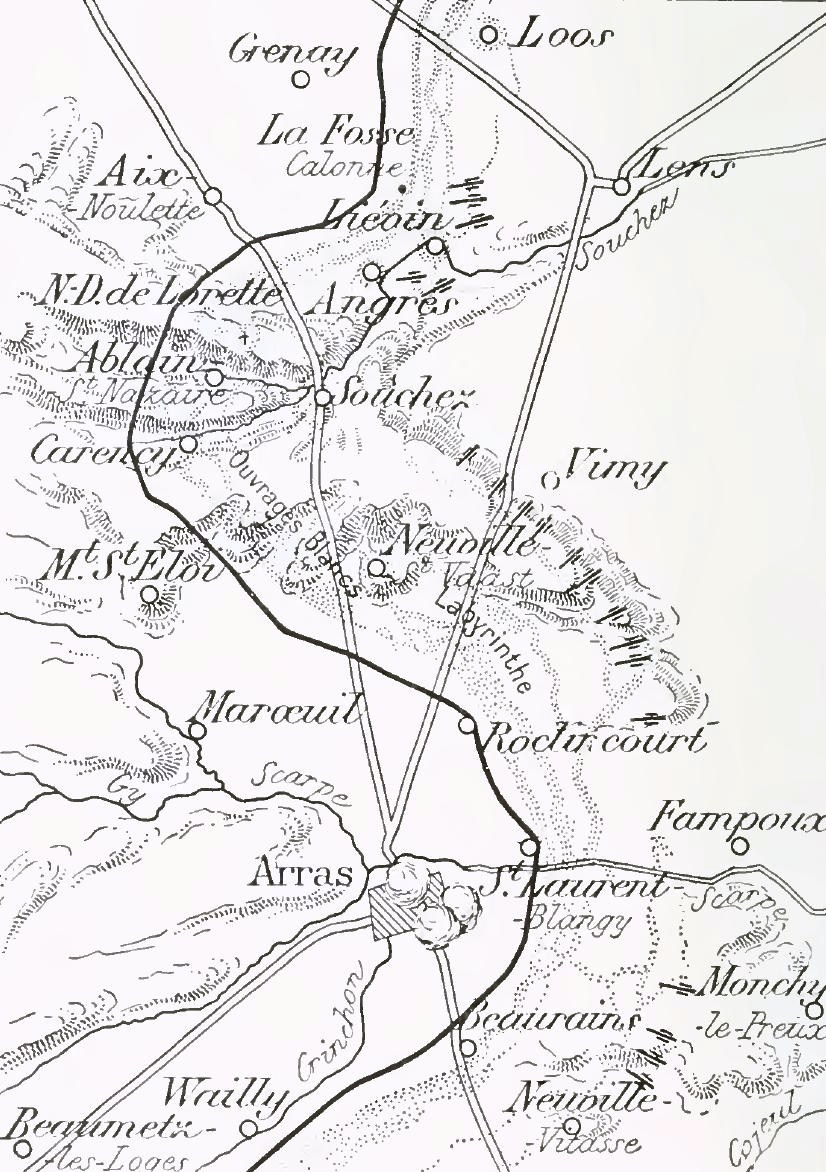
Artois front, May 1915

In March 1915, Joffre concluded that a period of inactivity would benefit the Germans more than the French; General Ferdinand Foch, commander of the Groupe Provisoire du Nord (GPN), proposed an offensive in which a "general action" on the Western Front including the British, to confuse the defenders and pin down reserves, would complement a "decisive action", to break through the German defences at a place where the Germans would not be able to establish a new defensive front by a short retirement. (Note: Joffre made theGroupes Provisoir permanent on 13 June and GPN became Groupe d'armées du Nord (GAN).) Joffre accepted the proposals on 23 March, with the objective being the seizure of Vimy Ridge and exploitation of the success by an eastwards advance into the Douai plain. The French army had not completed an adaptation to siege warfare and much of the equipment necessary, particularly heavy artillery, did not exist. It had been impossible to synchronise operations in Artois with the First Battle of Champagne, which ended on 17 March. Debate within the army as to means and ends had led to two schools of thought, those, like Joffre, who favoured "continuous battle" (an attack without pause involving all resources) and advocates of "methodical battle" like Foch, who wanted to conduct offensives as methodical series of attacks with pauses to reorganise and consolidate.

The theoretical bases of the forthcoming French offensive in Artois were collected in But et conditions d'une action offensive d'ensemble (Purpose and Conditions for Comprehensive Offensive Action) 16 April 1915 (and Note 5779) which had been compiled from analyses of reports received from the front since 1914. The document contained instructions on infiltration tactics, "rolling" barrages and poison gas, which were to be used systematically for the first time. (Note: The document was revised twice during the battle to reflect developments.) Although doubtful about the capacity of the British to attack, Joffre wanted an offensive on the northern flank of the Tenth Army, to force the Germans to disperse their defences. At a meeting on 29 March, with Sir John French, the commander of the British Expeditionary Force (BEF), and Herbert Kitchener, the Secretary of State for War, it was agreed that the IX Corps (9^{e} Corps d'Armée) and XX Corps would be relieved at Ypres by British units and on 1 April, French agreed to attack at the same time as the Tenth Army. French doubts about the efficiency of the BEF had not diminished after the Battle of Neuve Chapelle and British doubts about the French had increased after the débâcle at Ypres on 22 April, when French troops had been routed by a German gas attack; Joffre had to agree to place reserves behind the Ypres front to secure British co-operation.

The number of divisions in the German Army was increased over the winter with large intakes of recruits and by reorganising square twelve-battalion divisions (in two brigades with two regiments each) into triangular divisions with one brigade headquarters commanding nine battalions in three regiments. The surplus regiments provided new divisions with a nucleus of trained and experienced troops; smaller divisions made it easier to move them from quiet sectors without undue disruption. On 3 March, Falkenhayn had formed the 11th Army, the Durchbruchsarmee (Breakthrough Army) to be the main attacking force on the Western Front. On 30 March, its chief of staff, Colonel Hans von Seeckt, recommended an offensive between Arras and Albert, requiring fourteen corps and 150 heavy artillery batteries. An offensive in the west was cancelled in April, due to the deteriorating situation on the Eastern Front, where the Austro-Hungarian Army (Landstreitkräfte Österreich-Ungarns/Császári és Királyi Hadsereg) faced collapse. The 11th Army and other divisions of the Westheer were sent east and the initiative in the west was left with the Entente armies.

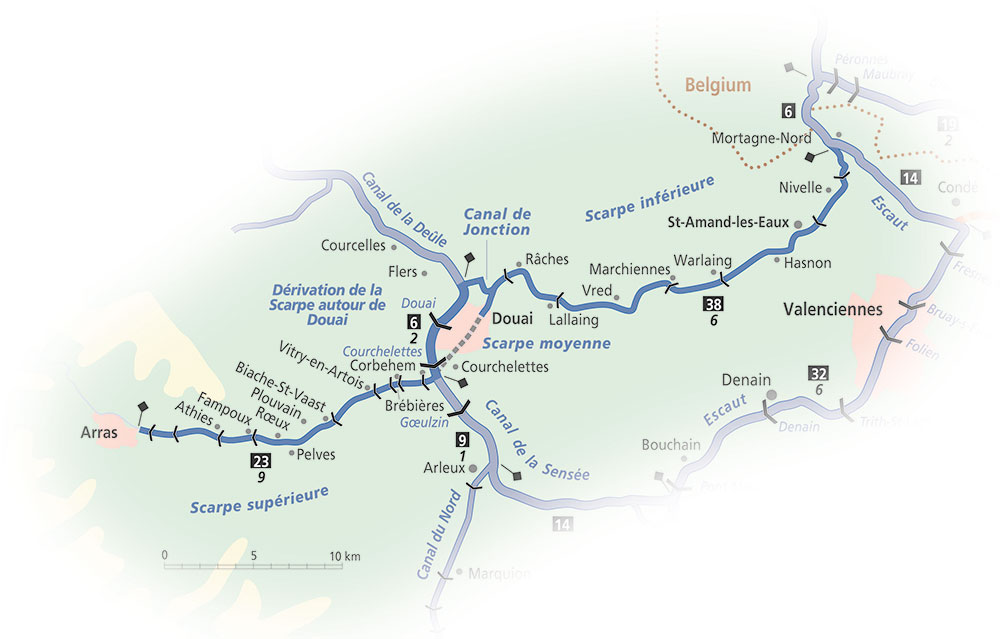
Modern course of the River Scarpe

The defences of the German army in the west had been improvised since late 1914 and in many places were vulnerable to the growing number of French heavy guns. During the spring, the Westheer began to build defences to a standard system, building a second position behind a barbed wire barricade, far enough behind the first position to require an attacker to pause to bring field artillery into range. The first position was elaborated into a zone, with camouflaged strong points and machine-gun nests built of concrete behind the front trenches. The 6th Army held a front of 56 mi (90 km) from Menin to the south of Arras with thirteen divisions and the 58th and 115th divisions in OHL reserve behind the front. The 6th Army had 660 field guns and 150 heavy guns. West of Lille, the front line was in the marshy Flanders plain and south of La Bassée, the ground was criss-crossed by waterways and drainage ditches, which made fortification difficult. West of Lens, the high ground of Vimy Ridge and the Lorette Spur dominated the ground further to the west; to the south, around Arras, the ground was overlooked from the ridge at Thilloy beyond the Scarpe.

== Prelude ==
=== French preparations ===
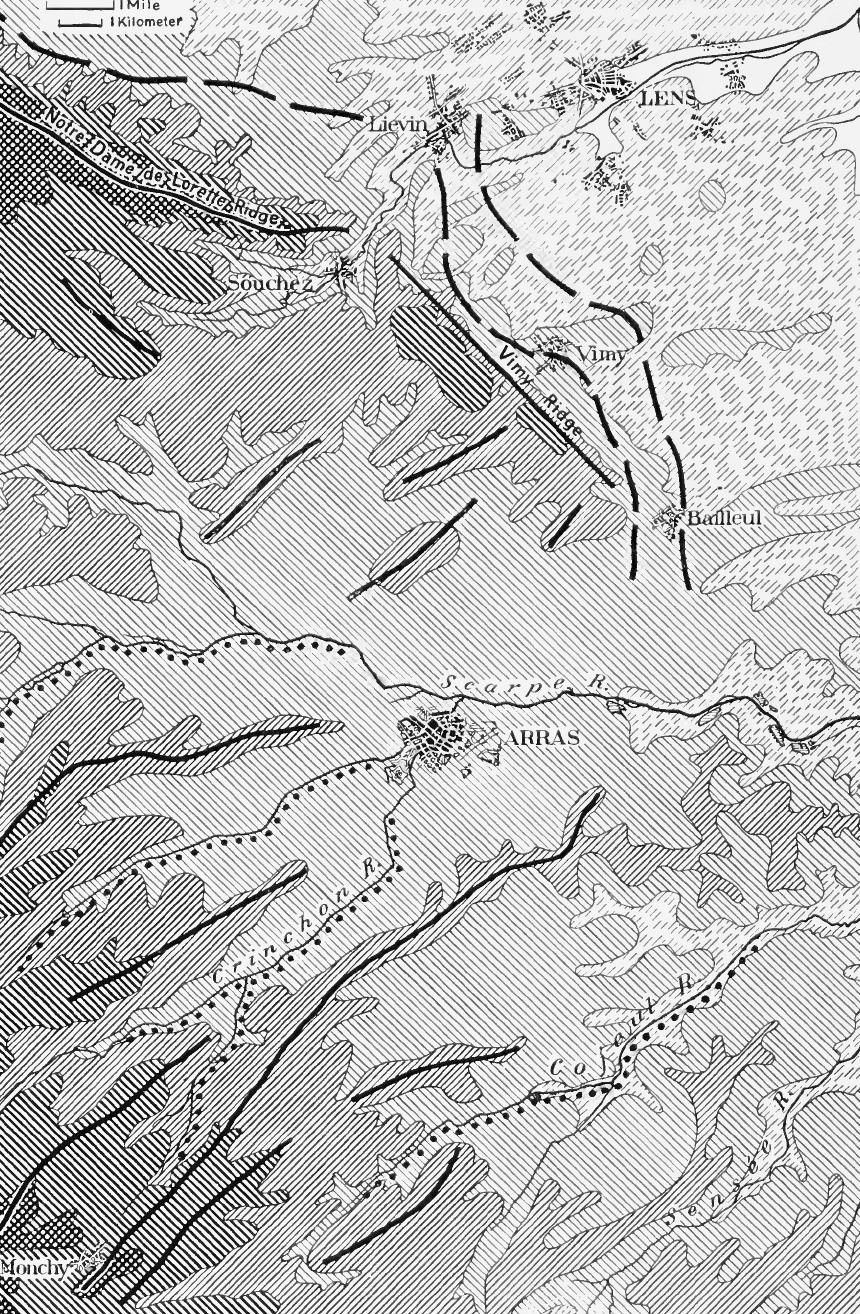
Topography of the Arras–Lens area showing ridge lines

Since January French sappers in the Carency area had tunnelled 1.5 mi (2.4 km), to plant 30 long tons (30 t) of explosives in galleries under the German positions. The main French front of attack was from the chapel on the plateau of Notre Dame de Lorette Spur (Lorette spur) south to the Labyrinthe, a network covering 2 mi^{2} (5.2 km^{2}) of trenches, tunnels and dug-outs across the Arras–Lens road north of Ecurie and Roclincourt. The spur was the southern boundary of the plain north of the Béthune–La Bassée Canal, which was 6 mi (9.7 km) long and wooded in parts, except at the east end. From the north the slopes of the ridge were low but on the south side there were steep spurs separated by ravines. West of Ablain St Nazaire (Ablain) was Spur Mathis and to the east, the Great Spur, the Arabs' Spur, the Spur of the White Way and the Spur of Souchez, which dominated the east edge of Ablain and the sugar refinery between Ablain and Souchez. By 20 March the French had worked their way up to the foot of the Great Spur and by 14 April had closed up to Ablain.

General d'Urbal was appointed to the command of the Tenth Army on 2 April, which had six infantry corps, a cavalry corps and three divisions in reserve. On the right (southern) flank was X Corps with the 19th and 20th divisions, the XVII Corps to the left with the 34th and 33rd divisions, XX Corps with the 11th and 39th divisions, XXXIII Corps with the Division Marocaine, 70th Division and 77th Division (général de division Stéphane Victor Pillot), XXI Corps with the 13th and 43rd divisions and IX Corps with the 92nd Territorial Division and the 17th and 58th divisions, covering the ground up to the British First Army 15 mi (24 km) to the north. The IX Corps and XX Corps had been relieved by the British in Flanders and moved south from 9 to 16 April, although the IX Corps headquarters and the 18th, 152nd and 153rd divisions had to be rushed up to Flanders after the German gas attack at the Second Battle of Ypres (21 April – 25 May). Artillery reinforcements increased the quantity of heavy artillery to 293 guns and field artillery to 1,075 guns. Increased production of ammunition had not kept pace with demand and the French artillery remained short of high explosive shells; poor quality ammunition also caused a large number of premature detonations in French artillery.

=== French plan ===
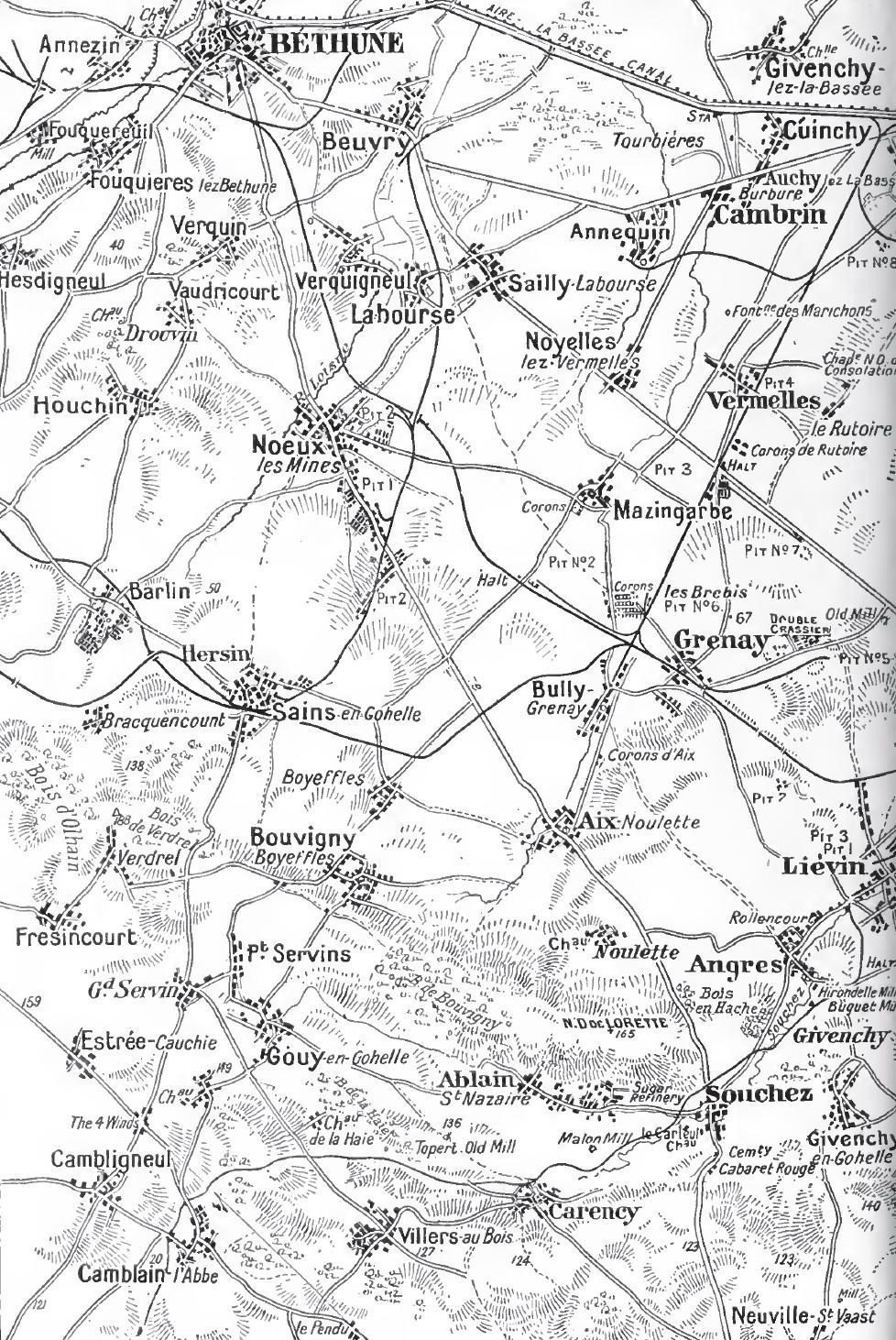
Artois area, 1915

The Tenth Army was to attack on a 9.3 mi (15 km) front, the main attack being made in the centre by the XVII, XX and XXXIII corps on a 6.2 mi (10 km) front, with supporting attacks along the spur south of Bailleul-Sir-Berthoult and by the XXI Corps with two divisions along the Notre-Dame de Lorette spur. The main attack was to capture Vimy Ridge and then consolidate to prevent German counter-attacks from recapturing the heights. Reserve divisions and cavalry would then begin a pursuit from the ridge into the Douai plain. D'Urbal wanted a four-hour artillery bombardment to surprise the German defenders but this was over-ruled by Foch and Joffre. A four-day bombardment was substituted, based on the experience of the offensives of the winter and early spring (especially the St Mihiel offensive). Delays in the arrival of artillery led to a postponement of the attack from 1 May until 7 May and the bombardment began on 3 May. Bad weather reduced visibility and the bombardment was extended to six days and on 8 May, the artillery began a destructive bombardment on the German front defences, which were severely damaged. In the last four hours, all of the Tenth Army artillery bombarded the German wire and the first and reserve trench lines, ready for the infantry attack at 10:00 a.m.

=== German preparations ===
The German defences had been improved in the ridges, hollows and ravines between Arras and Lens, since the war of movement had ended late in 1914. Barbed wire and chevaux-de-frise obstacles had been placed in front of the German defences and tunnels, caves and trenches, cellars and loopholed buildings had been fortified; avenues of approach were surveyed and registered by the German artillery. The 6th Army had retained most of the plateau of the Lorette Spur and all of the Spur of the White Way and Spur Souchez during the local attacks by the French in March and April. On 9 May, the French line ran about 1,100 yd (1,000 m) west of the Chapel, to the summit of the Arabs' Spur and by the Great Spur and Spur Mathis, down to the valley west of Ablain. Five German trench lines had been dug from the Arabs' Spur, across the plateau to the Arras–Béthune road near Aix-Noulette. The trench lines were fortified with iron roofs, sandbags, concrete and barbed wire.

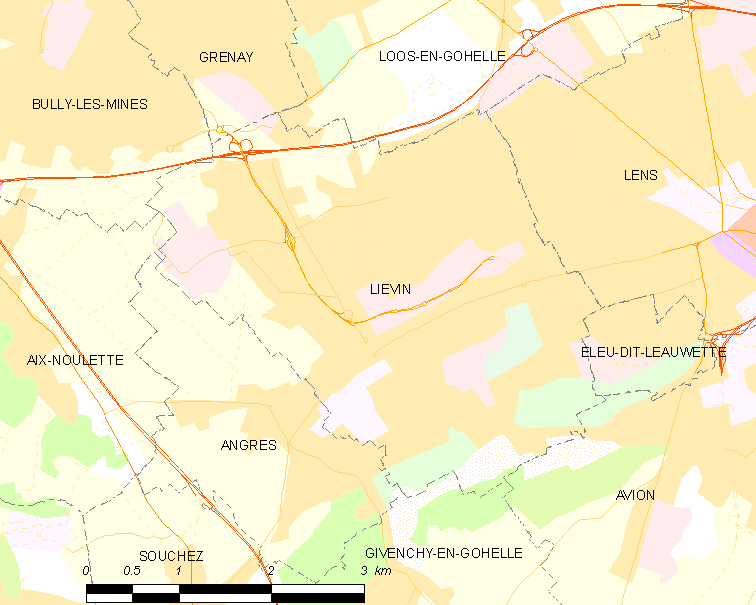
Map of Liévin area (commune FR insee code 62510)

At every 100 yd (91 m), a machine-gun nest had been built into the trench and small, fortified posts supported the defenders, one to the north-east of the Chapel of Notre Dame de Lorette, with dug-outs over 50 ft (15 m) deep. Artillery and machine-guns in Ablain commanded the southern slopes of the ridge and those in Souchez the eastern face of the spur. Guns hidden in Angres and Liévin to the north-east of the plateau commanded the approaches from the plain to the north and along the spur. Below the southern side of the Lorette Spur were Ablain, Souchez and a sugar refinery in buildings along a 200 yd (180 m)-length of the banks of the St Nazaire stream, which had been fortified. To the south was Mill Malon and east of the sugar refinery lay marshes.

South of Ablain rose wooded heights towards Carency, with the village in a hollow, the houses in five groups, one in the centre and the others facing north, west, south and east, protected by four lines of trenches. Each street and house had been fortified, connected by underground passages and garrisoned with four battalions of infantry and six companies of engineers. Field guns and machine-guns had been dug into the gardens and orchards, as well as behind the church, which made it impossible to attack the village except form the south and east. Trenches connected Carency with Ablain and Souchez on the Béthune–Arras road. Between Souchez and Arras at the hamlet of La Targette, the Germans had dug trenches, known as the White Works, under which lay a German fortress. To the east of La Targette, was the village of Neuville St Vaast, 1.5 mi (2.4 km) long and 700 yd (640 m) wide, between the Arras–Béthune and Arras–Lens roads, which had also been turned into an underground fortress.

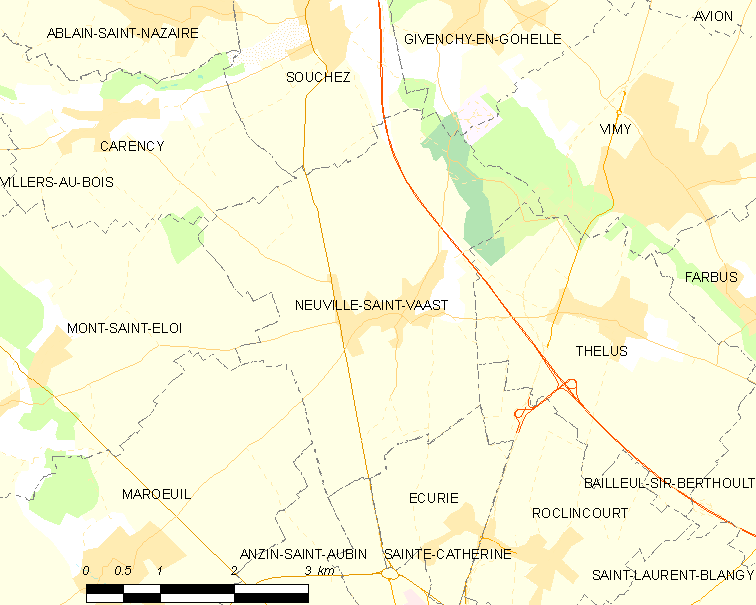
Map of Neuville St Vaast and vicinity (commune FR insee code 62609)

South of Neuville St Vaast extended the Labyrinthe, on both sides of the Arras–Lens road, which contained tunnels and small strong points organised in a maze, with frequent blank walls and sally ports for the defenders to appear behind the attackers, linked by tunnels to Neuville St Vaast. About 2 mi (3.2 km) east of the Labyrinthe and Neuville St Vaast was the edge of the heights bounding the plain between the Scarpe and the Béthune–La-Bassée–Lille Canal. Opposite the French Tenth Army, the XIV Corps held the front with the 29th and 28th divisions and to the south, I Bavarian Reserve Corps held the line from Souchez to the south bank of the Scarpe at Arras, with the 5th and 1st Bavarian Reserve divisions.

After the British attack at Neuve Chapelle, the local attacks which had occurred since December 1914 resumed, which resulted in minor changes of the front line. At the end of April, indications of a bigger attack in preparation and reports of new French units being formed suggested a more ambitious French attack north of Arras. French artillery fire began to increase in May but the weather in Artois was mainly cloudy and overcast, which with French air superiority restricted German air reconnaissance and ground observation of the rear of the French Tenth Army. Infantry patrolling was also inhibited and the presence of the French XVII Corps was not detected until 8 May. An attack on the same day was made on the positions of the 28th Division west of Liévin by the French 43rd Division, which was eventually repulsed at great cost to both sides.

== Battle ==
=== First phase, 9–20 May ===
==== Tenth Army ====
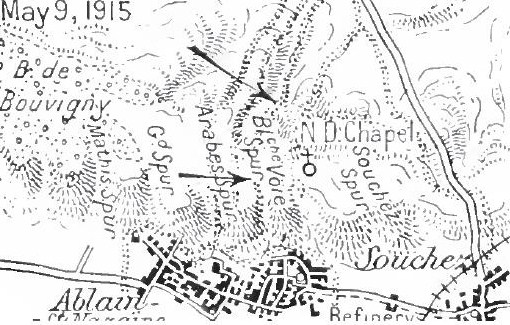
French attack on Notre Dame de Lorette, 9 May 1915

The final bombardment began at 6:00 a.m., with registration of targets for an hour. (Note: The French convention of describing military operations from left to right has been observed in this section.) At 8:00 a.m. the mines in the Carency sector and the Lorette Spur were sprung, as an intense bombardment of the first two German positions continued, until a ten-minute pause at 9:40 a.m., followed by a ten-minute hurricane bombardment. As the infantry began their attack, the bombardment changed to a creeping barrage. At 10:00 a.m. the infantry attack began in bright dry weather. Three of the trench lines on the Lorette Spur were captured by Chasseurs and supporting infantry of XXI Corps with many casualties. A fortified post in the centre of the German line was not captured and German artillery near Angres bombarded the lost trenches, as machine-guns in Ablain swept the French infantry. Fighting continued after dark and the French began to dig in. The German front trenches at Carency were captured and against orders, the French tried to continue into the village but fire from a strong point to the east stopped the French advance. XXI Corps had managed to advance 660 ft (200 m) through the maze of fortifications on the Lorette Spur and IX Corps beyond made a little progress.

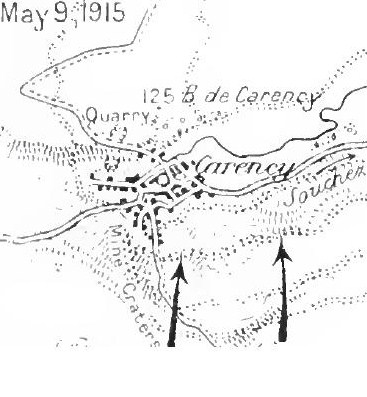
Attack on Carency, 9 May

On the northern flank of XXXIII Corps, the 70th Division attacked Ablain, Carency and Souchez and strong points at Bois 125 and the sugar refinery. The division reached the fringes of the villages but the repulse of the right-hand regiment led the most advanced troops to withdraw to a line 660 yd (600 m) forward of the start-line. In the XXXIII Corps area, the Division Marocaine (DM) attacked with two waves of "shock troops", who were lightly-equipped and pushed forward as quickly as possible, leaving isolated German positions to the Nettoyeurs (cleaners) following them. The German wire was found to be well cut and by 11:30 a.m., the advanced troops reached point 140 on Vimy Ridge and dug in, having made an advance of over 4,300 yd (2.4 mi; 3.9 km), supported soon after by the arrival of machine-gun teams.

Divisional reserves were ordered forward at 10:15 a.m. and at 1:30 p.m. d'Urbal ordered the 18th Division to move up but it had been stationed 5.0 mi (8 km) back to be out of German artillery range. Reserve units had great difficulty in advancing through German artillery fire, which left the DM in a narrow salient and under fire from all directions. During the afternoon, the DM was counter-attacked and forced off the ridge, managing to take several guns, machine-guns and 1,500 German prisoners with them. The 77th Division reached Givenchy-en-Gohelle, the cemetery at Souchez, Château de Carleul and took c. 500 prisoners and thirty machine-guns but was soon forced back to the Souchez–Neuville road, by German artillery-fire and counter-attacks. The French infantry also suffered many casualties and found that artillery support had diminished, as the field artillery was firing at the limit of its range. German communication trenches between Carency and Souchez were blocked, which cut off Carency except via Ablain.

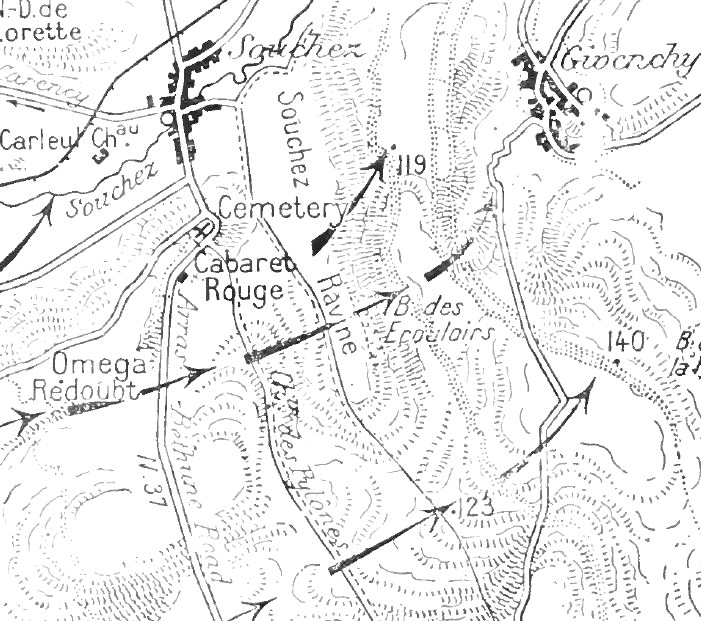
French attack on Hill 119, 9 May 1915

The 39th Division crossed the German trenches in front of La Targette, where two strong points contained artillery but the French advance was so swift, that only a few machine-gunners were able to engage them and the village was captured by 11:15 a.m., 350 prisoners being taken. The area was quickly consolidated and French field artillery galloped up to engage German troops nearby. The French pressed on to Neuville and advanced up the southern part of Vimy Ridge but troops of the 11th Division on the right flank, were held up by the defenders of the Labyrinthe. In the centre, the French gained a foothold in houses at the south end of the village and near the cemetery and half of the village was captured.

On the main front, the French artillery had prepared the way for the infantry and creeping barrages had kept the surviving German infantry pinned down but where the French had fewer heavy guns and ammunition, the attacks had failed. The XVII Corps to the south of the attack front, had been expected to make a deeper advance than the other corps but was stopped by German machine-gun fire in no man's land and was only able to establish small footholds in the first position. In the south of the attack front, the X Corps infantry were stopped in no man's land. By nightfall the Tenth Army had taken 3,000 prisoners, ten field guns and fifty machine-guns. The success of XXXIII Corps had used up much of its ammunition and poor-quality shells had caused 24 premature explosions in its guns, against only four knocked out by German counter-battery fire.

On 10 May, Joffre and Foch decided that infantry attacks would have to reflect the capacity of the artillery to support them and a proposal by d'Urbal to attack south of Arras was rejected. Joffre ordered several cavalry divisions to move towards the Tenth Army area as a decoy. To keep German reserves pinned down, a feint attack was made north of the Lorette Spur towards Loos, which managed a small advance on the left, until stopped by the fire of German artillery in Angres. On the Lorette Spur, machine-gun fire from a German strong point near the chapel caused many French casualties. A counter-attack from the sugar refinery between Ablain and Souchez was seen assembling and the French attack in the area was suspended. Barrage fire by the French artillery prevented the German infantry from advancing and the French infantry descended from the spur towards the Ablain ravine. The attack on Carency continued and German counter-attacks recovered some of the communication trenches and tunnels connecting it with Souchez. During the day, houses east of the village were stormed and a hollow south of the Carency–Souchez road was captured.

A lull occurred on the main front as the French infantry reorganised and the surviving German defenders recovered from the effects of the attack. French gunners were hampered (paralysed) by their ignorance of the positions of the infantry and left unable to fire a preparatory bombardment; the gunners concentrated on shelling German reserves seen advancing and on counter-battery fire. The most advanced French infantry were cut off by German barrage-fire, suffered from a serious shortage of water and frequently were counter-attacked, which rapidly reduced their ability to attack again, particularly in the units which had advanced the furthest. To the south of XXXIII Corps, the 39th Division attacked Neuville, on the orders of the corps commander, despite the reservations of the divisional and army commanders, suffering a costly repulse by devastating fire from the defenders. On the right, beyond the Arras–Béthune road, Neuville cemetery was taken and counter-attacks by German reserves brought up from Douai and Lens were repulsed.

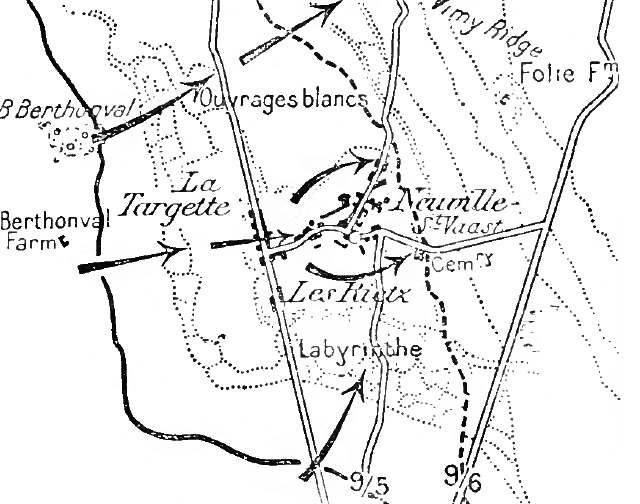
Attack on Neuville St Vaast, 9 May

By 11 May, the Tenth Army had reorganised sufficiently to attempt another general offensive but the DM and the 77th Division, which were the most advanced, received the fewest reinforcements and supplies. Communication with the foremost troops was almost impossible through the German artillery-fire but d'Urbal thought that the German defence was rapidly increasing in effectiveness and that delay would put the French at a greater disadvantage. To the north the 70th Division and the 13th Division of XXI Corps managed to advance at Ablain, Carency, Bois 125 and along the Lorette Spur, which left the German garrison in Ablain outflanked on both sides. The attack by the XXXIII Corps was met by a huge volume of German artillery and small-arms fire and repulsed, the DM having suffered 5,120 casualties since 9 May; the 77th Division also gained little ground due to German flanking fire. On the evening of 11 May, the French captured the lower slopes of the Arabs' Spur in mutually costly fighting and a night counter-attack by German troops from the Spur of the White Way was repulsed. The 13th and 43rd divisions captured the crest of the Lorette Spur during the night, which deprived the Germans of the commanding views from the ridge. German artillery in Angres and the machine-guns in Ablain kept a constant fire on the new French positions.

On 11 May, D'Urbal reinforced the XXXIII Corps and XX Corps with fresh divisions, ready to attack after a two-hour bombardment. The French captured the wood east of Carency, which overlooked German communication trenches with Souchez and prevented their use. A German party on a wooded hillock kept the French from the east end of the village and the western approach was blocked by infantry at a stone quarry, nearly 300 ft (91 m) deep. To the south, XX Corps made slow progress at Neuville, where the 39th Division held a front with a right-angle facing the western and northern fringes of the village, with the right-hand brigade attacking the village and the left-hand brigade attempting to capture ferme La Folie. Every attempt to advance was met with massed artillery-fire. IX Corps on the northern flank, X and XVII corps on the southern flank, made limited attacks, which were mostly repulsed.

To the south, the French attack on Neuville and the Labyrinthe continued and the cemetery was captured. Pétain reported that machine-gun fire from both flanks and German artillery-fire had increased, which had caused far more casualties. The result of the attack on 11 May, led d'Urbal to order that the German defences on the flanks at Souchez and Neuville were to be captured, before resuming the attack on Vimy Ridge. XXI Corps was to resume the advance along the Lorette Spur, XXXIII Corps was to capture Carency and then attack Souchez, as XX Corps to the south attacked Neuville. Before dawn on 12 May, French Chasseurs attacked the strong point near the Chapel of Notre Dame de Lorette on the Lorette Spur; after hand-to-hand fighting the strong point and the remains of the Chapel were captured. At dawn, under a German artillery bombardment, the French pushed towards the Spur of the White Way, which commanded the valley from Ablain to Souchez.

At Carency, French infantry attacked after a bombardment, captured the wooded hillock east of the village and eventually took the stone quarry to the west. The French entered the western block of houses at the same time and at 5.30 p.m. about 1,000 members of the garrison surrendered. Conditions on the plateau were appalling, because bursting shells had disinterred the corpses of hundreds of French and German soldiers killed before the offensive. The French continued the advance from Carency towards Ablain, which suddenly caught fire, as the Germans withdrew to houses at the eastern fringe of the village. The French took 2,000 prisoners, field artillery and machine-guns in the area. On Thursday 13 May, in heavy rain a German counter-attack on the Spur of the White Way was repulsed by machine-gun fire. By the morning of 14 May, the French had captured most of the Lorette Spur and Carency but not the intervening positions, from which flanking fire had stopped the XXXIII Corps from advancing on Souchez. On 15 May, another French attack on the Spur of the White Way failed and until 21 May, the French on the Lorette Spur consolidated, under fire from the German artillery at Angres and Liévin. In the valley, the Germans held on at the east end of Ablain and recaptured the church and cemetery.

==== British First Army ====
Two areas of the German front line, on either side of the Neuve Chapelle battlefield, were attacked by the British First Army (General Sir Douglas Haig). In the south, I Corps and the Indian Corps attacked on a 2,400 yd (1.4 mi; 2.2 km) front from the Rue du Bois and IV Corps attacked in the north on a 1,500 yd (1,400 m) front opposite Fromelles. The attack was intended to make two breaches in the German defences 6,000 yd (3.4 mi; 5.5 km) apart, after which the infantry were to advance to Aubers Ridge about 3,000 yd (1.7 mi; 2.7 km) beyond. The preliminary bombardment began on 9 May at 5:00 a.m. and at 5:30 a.m. became intense. Ten minutes later, the infantry attacked and surprised the German defenders, artillery fire cutting all the German telephone lines to the rear. Visibility was poor due to smoke and dust and the bombardment proved less effective than assumed; much of the British shell-fire fell short and few of the German machine-guns were destroyed. German machine-gunners and artillery began to fire at the same time and in ten minutes inflicted many casualties on the British infantry as they advanced across no man's land.

The failure of the attack to gain more than a few footholds in the German first line led to a second attack at 8:00 a.m. after a forty-five-minute bombardment, which was repelled in no man's land by German defensive fire. A new attack was ordered for noon but was delayed until about 5:00 p.m. Despite a "terrific" bombardment, the German machine-gun nests were not destroyed and the machine-gunners stopped the attack with flanking-fire. To assist the French, whose attack had been more successful, another attack was ordered for 8:00 p.m. and then cancelled as it became clear that another attack could not be launched. The extent of the British defeat had not been realised, due to the difficulty of communicating with the front line. The British suffered c. 11,000 casualties and German casualties had also been severe; the defensive position had been turned into a crater-field but German reserves were moved from the British front to Vimy Ridge on 12 May. Joffre and Foch met French that day to persuade him to resume the attack after the redeployment of German divisions south against the Tenth Army; French agreed to relieve a French division south of La Bassée by 15 May.

=== Second phase, 12 May – 12 June ===
==== Tenth Army ====
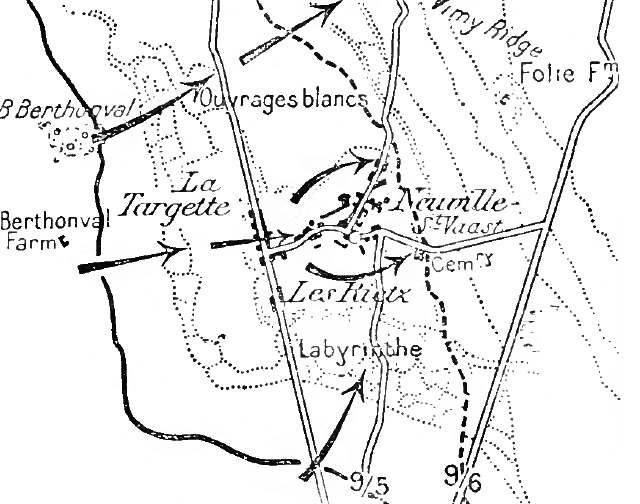
Capture of Neuville St Vaast, 9 May – 9 June 1915

Pétain proposed a combined attack on Souchez with the divisions of XXXIII and XXI corps for 12 May, which was rejected due to the exhaustion of the XXI Corps divisions. Pétain substituted a plan for three limited attacks against Carency, Bois 125, Ablain and Souchez, with similar attack in the south against Neuville. Joffre sent the III Corps to the Tenth Army as reinforcement but also had to withdraw artillery to support the British attack due at Festubert. After 11 May, the French consolidated captured positions and moved the supply infrastructure of the army, hospitals, depots, rail lines and headquarters forward. New artillery positions were prepared, ready for operations to secure bases de départ (jumping-off positions); depleted units were relieved and replacements trained by the survivors.

The attacks by the 70th, part of the 77th and the 13th divisions which captured Bois 125, Carency and the chapel on the Lorette Spur, placed the German garrison in Ablain in a salient and forced the Germans to withdraw on 12 May, to a line from Château Carleul to Souchez, the cemetery at Ablain and the sugar refinery. German troops in the remaining positions of the Lorette Spur withdrew to maintain contact with the new defensive positions to the east. On 13 May, the 70th Division cautiously followed up the German retirement and the 77th and 13th divisions made a converging attack on the sugar refinery. Engineers rebuilt trenches in the captured area ready for an attack on Souchez on 14 May.

At Neuville the 11th Division and part of the 39th Division attacked again on 12 May, despite the costly failure on 11 May, when some units had 50 per cent casualties. The 39th Division advanced, the infantry moving behind a shower of hand grenades and trench mortar bombs but was forced back when the left-hand regiment was repulsed. The 11th Division was bogged down in Neuville and the Labyrinthe. The 39th Division commander, General Nourrisson, objected to the continuation of large attacks but d'Urbal insisted that they continue as new defences were dug and fresh troops were brought forward. Until 15 May large rushed attacks continued, with many failures and a few costly successes. On 15 May a larger general attack was made and was another costly failure. Artillery support was inadequate due to losses from German counter-battery fire and barrel explosions from inferior ammunition. Artillery tactics were unchanged and the density of shell-fire diminished, which gave German reinforcements, which had arrived from 13 to 14 May time to dig in many new machine-guns and meet the attack with massed machine-gun fire supported by a heavy bombardment by the artillery, which stopped the attack as soon as it began.

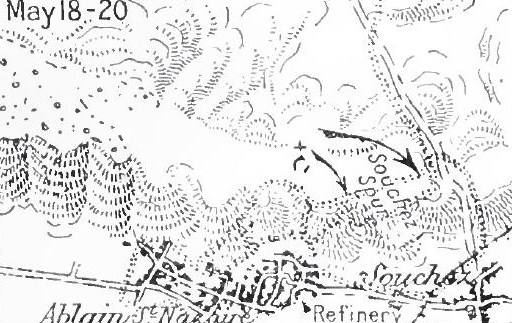
Attack on Notre Dame de Lorette, 18–20 May 1915

On 18 May, d'Urbal asked for the XVII and X corps to be withdrawn by 24 May because of the costly failure of their attacks but was over-ruled by Foch, who ordered an end to rushed attacks. Foch ordered a pause of eight days, to prepare an attack with the thoroughness of 9 May; in the interim, local attacks were to be made with massed artillery support on limited objectives. Joffre supported the intervention by Foch and also ordered d'Urbal to restrict attacks to piecemeal efforts against local points of tactical importance. Until 15 June the French made many limited attacks on the flanks of the 77th and Moroccan divisions, using the same troops and same tactics. On 23 May the XXI Corps captured the rest of the Lorette Spur and on 27 May the 70th Division took Ablain cemetery, then the sugar refinery on 31 May, which made Souchez vulnerable to an attack from the west as well as the south. The limited narrow-front attacks were much better supported by the artillery.

A revised version of Note 5779 was issued on 20 May by GQG, which asserted that the version of 16 April had been vindicated by events. The new version endorsed "continuous battle" and emphasised that reserves must be pushed forward to avoid the mistake made on 9 May, when they had been held back out of German artillery range. An analysis of German defensive methods, described the use of small numbers of infantry equipped with large numbers of machine-guns, firing from flanks and the sheltering of infantry in deep dug-outs, immune to field artillery; French defensive positions were to be modelled on the German practice. Local attacks were resumed but while modestly successful and remaining within the material constraints on the Tenth Army, were hampered by a drastic loss of experience, caused by the extent of French losses. The tempo of limited attacks was beyond the capacity of the Tenth Army to supply and train replacement soldiers according to the requirements of Note 5779. An attempt to return to larger combined attacks by IX, XXI and XXXIII corps from 25 to 26 May failed in most places, because of increases in the capability of the German defence, the impossibility of obtaining surprise and a lack of time to plan operations or to rest troops.

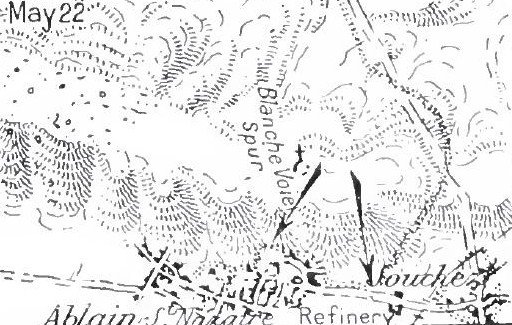
Attack on Notre Dame de Lorette, 22 May 1915

Pétain wrote that German barrages were being fired daily, which made infantry attacks almost impossible and that varying French bombardments to obtain surprise made little difference, now that the German artillery had been reinforced and was ready at a moment's notice to begin barrage fire. German guns were registered on no man's land and had only to fire into the area to hit French infantry during an attack. The French counter-battery effort had to wait until German guns revealed themselves and then begin area fire near the German artillery, which was a waste of ammunition. Pétain wanted more air reconnaissance but aircraft wireless was of extremely short range and during attacks, confusion on the ground made artillery observation from the air impossible. As an alternative, Pétain suggested making highly detailed maps of the German rear areas and systematically bombarding German artillery emplacements continuously, rather than during attacks but the suggestions were impractical, because of the ammunition shortage.

Foch and d'Urbal met late on 15 May and ordered that the offensive was to end temporarily, as the attacks after 9 May had been poorly prepared and of diminishing effectiveness. Preparations with the standard of detail and organisation of the attack on 9 May were to be made before the offensive resumed. "Bases of departure" were to be captured at Souchez and Neuville, before an attack on Vimy Ridge, which Foch expected to take eight to ten days. D'Urbal cancelled an attack due on 16 May and issued instructions to each corps to capture limited objectives. XXXIII Corps was given five objectives before an attack on Souchez and XXI Corps three objectives before supporting the attack on Souchez. The first limited objective attack was planned for 17 May but rainstorms forced a delay until 20 May and the night of 20/21 May. Huge artillery bombardments preceded infantry attacks, intended to occupy several hundred square metres of ground at a time. On the afternoon of 21 May, the French attacked the Spur of the White Way from the north, south and west. A party attacking from the Arabs' Spur captured their objectives in minutes and another party attacking from the north seized the main German communication trench, surrounding and taken the garrison prisoner. The attack from Ablain captured houses west of the church and the communications trench linking the White Way with Souchez was cut; 300 German prisoners and a field gun were taken. At 2:00 a.m. on 22 May, a German counter-attack from a foothold in Ablain was repulsed.

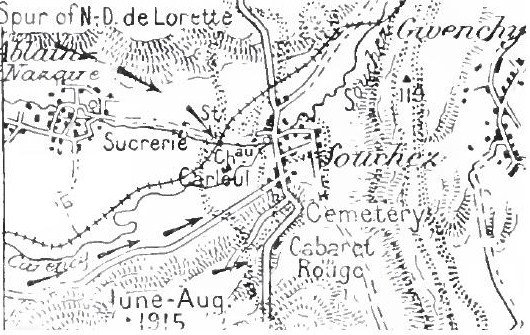
Souchez, June–August 1915

On 25 May IX, XXI and XXXIII corps attacked limited objectives simultaneously, after artillery bombarded the attack front all day but made little progress. The remnants of the garrison in Ablain were attacked again on 28 May in their remaining trenches around the cemetery. French artillery placed a barrage to the east of the cemetery, cutting off the garrison before the infantry attacked and took 400 prisoners. During the night the Germans in a group of houses to the south of the church were mopped up and outside the village a strong point was taken. Early on 29 May the remaining German positions at the church and rectory were captured. French casualties in the final attack were 200, mainly caused by artillery fire. The French attacked into the valley and on 31 May captured Mill Malon, advanced up a communication trench to the sugar refinery and rushed the German garrison, which was overwhelmed as dark fell. At midnight a German counter-attack gradually pushed the French back into the communication trench.

A French artillery barrage was arranged and troops on the outskirts of Ablain advanced to the refinery along the stream, as the troops at the communication trench reorganised and attacked again. The Germans were forced back and by the evening of 1 June the position was connected with Ablain by communication trenches (fighting in the area continued sporadically from June–September). From 25 to 28 May French attacks towards Andres failed. D'Urbal continued the limited-objective attacks but transferred the main artillery effort south to Neuville. A three-day preparatory bombardment began on 2 June and on 6 June French infantry captured the main road through the village, as the German garrison replied with massed small-arms fire from cellars and demolished houses. German artillery-fire also caused many French casualties but by 11 June, the French had advanced 1,600 ft (500 m) on a 980 ft (300 m) front.

==== British First Army ====
The British adopted siege warfare tactics of limited attacks prepared by a greater weight of artillery fire, to capture more ground and hold it with fewer casualties. British attacks resumed near Festubert from Port Arthur 850 yd (780 m) north to Rue du Bois, with a night attack by three divisions at 11:30 pm on 15 May, after a three-day bombardment, with 26,000 shells carefully observed on a 5,000 yd (4,600 m) front. The German breastwork was destroyed but many of the machine-gun posts underneath survived, as did infantry dugouts under the second line of breastworks. The attack was limited to an objective about 1,000 yd (910 m) forward along La Quinque Rue road. On the right flank the advance succeeded, a silent advance surprising the surviving Germans in the remains of the breastwork and then capturing the Wohngraben (support trench) before digging in. On the left German return fire stopped the advance in no man's land. An attack at 3:15 a.m. on the right by the 7th Division was successful in parts but with many casualties. Much of the German front line was destroyed and captured but scattered German parties in shell-holes blocked both flanks and prevented a further British advance.

On 16 May Haig resumed the offensive with the Battle of Festubert, which was fought on the right flank of the Aubers Ridge battlefield, where British troops were ordered to press on to local objectives only after consolidating. By the morning of 17 May, the German 14th Division was forced to retire to a new breastwork dug .75 mi (1.21 km) behind the original front position, connecting the Stützpunktlinie (strongpoint line) behind the front line, with the result that British bombardments and attacks met only small parties of rearguards. The Quadrilateral was captured at about 10:15 a.m. on 17 May after an extensive bombardment led to a large number of German troops surrendering. Reinforcements doubled the German firepower in the new position, from which in the afternoon British attempts to continue the advance were repulsed. Low cloud and rain obscured the battlefield and it took three days for the British to identify the new line. A series of attacks by four British divisions from 18 to 25 May achieved minor advances of the British line but found that the captured positions had been registered by German artillery, which maintained a heavy bombardment, which forced the British back at some places and inflicted many casualties. The fighting cost the British 16,644 casualties and the Germans c. 5,500. Fighting continued until 25 May for local objectives against German reinforcements, which were not available to oppose the French further south.

=== Third phase, 13–18 June ===
==== Tenth Army ====
The eight days, that Foch thought necessary to capture ground on the flanks of XXXIII Corps, took five weeks to achieve. Small advances were made but the Germans were able to improve their defences relatively easily, in dips and behind slopes. Artillery reinforcements were registered as they arrived on obvious avenues of attack, which required only notification by flare signals from the front line to commence firing. The Tenth Army also received substantial reinforcements of artillery but these made only a small net increase, due to losses from German artillery fire, mechanical failures and premature detonations. Infantry reinforcements were only marginally greater than losses. Artillery ammunition for the 355 heavy and 805 field guns was much greater for the second general attack, with 718,551 shells available from 16 to 18 June, compared to 265,430 fired from 3 to 9 May. The preliminary bombardment was to begin on 10 June and concentrate on certain areas to conceal the imminence of an infantry attack. On the day of the attack, the artillery was to destroy defences repaired by the Germans overnight and conduct counter-battery fire until the last moment, as a deception, then fall on the German front defences as the French infantry advanced, to mislead the Germans and get the infantry across no man's land before a German barrage began.

The Franco-British attack on 9 May had been on a front of 16 mi (25 km) and in June three supporting attacks were planned by the French Second, Sixth and Seventh armies, along with an attack by the British near Zillebeke in Flanders. The preliminary bombardment was due to begin on 13 June and XXI Corps was to attack from the Lorette Spur towards Bois de Givenchy, XX Corps was to complete the capture of Neuville and the Labyrinthe and XXIII Corps was shifted slightly north to attack Souchez, Château Carleul, Côte 119 and Givenchy-en-Gohelle. IX Corps was moved from the northern boundary of the Tenth Army and placed between XXXIII Corps and XX Corps to take Vimy Ridge. During minor attacks in early June, the IX Corps divisions had gained little success and in one attack the infantry went to ground and refused to continue, which if repeated would leave the XXXIII Corps vulnerable to another advance into a salient. The artillery preparation was carefully observed from the front line and IX Corps troops were issued flares to signal to the artillery, who reported a highly accurate bombardment, particularly on the 5 Chemins crossroads and a derelict mill, which were the principal German defensive works opposite.

On 15 June the commander of the 17th Division on the right of the IX Corps, wrote to General Curé, the corps commander, that preparations were incomplete and had not conformed to Note 5779, leaving the jumping-off trenches 660–980 ft (200–300 m) from the German front line, rather than the 490 ft (150 m) or fewer laid down and that the infantry was already exhausted. In the rest of the Tenth Army the situation was the same, with infantry being set to hours of digging under German counter-bombardments. It was also discovered that the accuracy of French artillery-fire, was not sufficient to make it effective. An attack on 13 June, by a regiment of the 70th Division on the sugar refinery, captured a small length of the German front trench, where they were bombarded by French artillery. An attack on 14 June took another short length of trench but the regiment had to be relieved by part of the 13th Division during the night of 15/16 June. Reports from the IX and XX corps on the southern flank, described accurate French artillery fire and XXI Corps on the Lorette Spur had a commanding view of German defences. Maistre the corps commander, had made artillery observation a specialist role for trained men, who kept close to the infantry to ensure efficient liaison.

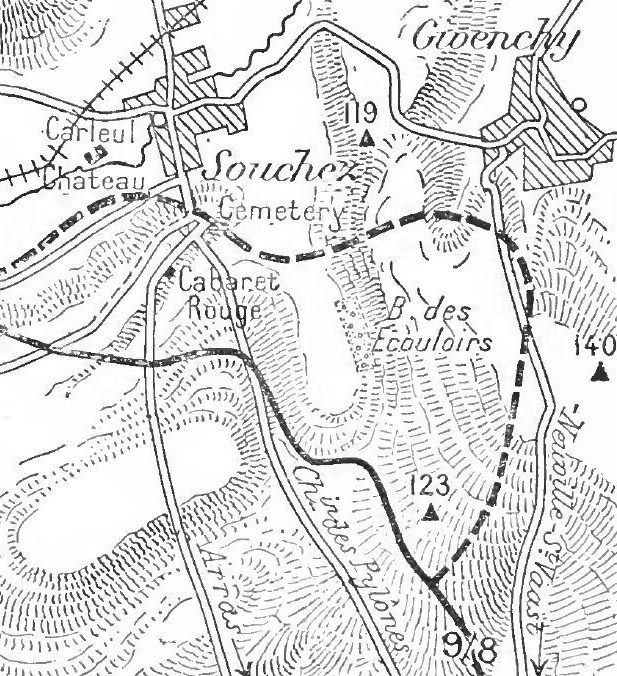
French attack on Hill 119, 16 June 1915

It was soon discovered that the Germans had put barbed wire 160 ft (50 m) in front of the front line, rather than just in front and special bombardments were fired to cut the wire, after which patrols went forward to check the results, despite German counter-bombardments. On the 43rd Division front, it was discovered that field artillery was only shifting the barbed wire around and not damaging cheveaux de frise but modern 155mm guns were used in time to create several gaps in the wire. Visibility early on 16 June was poor and the French heavy artillery began with a slow bombardment until 12:15 p.m., when a creeping barrage began to move from the French front line in 160 ft (50 m) bounds and a second barrage began at maximum range and crept backwards in 82 ft (25 m) bounds, until both barrages coincided on Vimy Ridge and became a standing barrage until the French infantry arrived. The IX Corps divisions found that the German defences were intact when the attack began and the 17th Division was swept by artillery and machine-gun fire, forcing it back to its jumping-off trenches; the 18th Division managed to capture the German first position and a second attack was ordered for the afternoon.

IX, XX and XXXIII corps used 10,000 shells, which contained poison gas and incendiary material on Neuville, Souchez and Angres, German artillery positions at ferme La Folie and rear areas. The shells were filled with carbon disulphide and phosphorus, which gave a combined asphyxiating and incendiary effect. The gas shells suppressed the German artillery opposite from 1:00–2:30 p.m. and set many fires in Angres but not at Souchez, which had been bombarded so much that there was little combustible material left. The 17th Division managed to advance another 330 ft (100 m) and the 18th Division was stopped in no man's land. On the right flank, the 39th Division of XX Corps was repulsed in the first attack, despite creeping forward before zero hour to be clear of a German counter-bombardment and to catch the German infantry under cover. The division prepared a new bombardment for 3:20 p.m. on the German front line, to at least advance across no man's land. The new attack also failed, as did the attacks of the 17th and 11th divisions on either flank.

In the XXXIII Corps area, the DM was fresh and easily overran the German front defences with minimal casualties. When the infantry pressed on, they found that the Germans had dug overlapping flanking positions and deep dugouts, which had protected German infantry from the French artillery. The infantry reached Côte 119, where fire from Souchez stopped the advance. Supporting troops had lagged behind in communication trenches full of wounded and prisoners as German artillery-fire increased and only arrived at 8:00 p.m. German counter-attacks were made using many hand grenades, which caused many casualties. To the north, the 77th and 70th divisions attacked Souchez, where the chemical shells had little effect; the 77th divisional artillery had twice the number of shells than on 9 May but was nullified by the new German defences on reverse slopes, which were immune to fire from guns and could only be engaged by Howitzers, which were brought forward on 15/16 June, only twelve hours before the attack. The 159th Regiment advanced over a hillock, met uncut wire and massed fire from small arms and artillery, out of view of the French front line. The 97th Regiment captured Souchez cemetery with few casualties but the repulse of the 159th Regiment uncovered the flanks of the 97th Regiment and the adjacent DM, which made an attack on Souchez village impossible. An attack by the 159th Regiment at 4:00 p.m. was also stopped immediately by German return fire.

In the XXI Corps area, the 70th Division was bombarded by German artillery as the attack began, in response to flares sent up from the German front line. The 42nd BCP took part of Château Carleul against determined German resistance but then stopped to maintain contact with the 77th Division to the right. The 360th and 237th regiments were met by a wall of fire and were not able to advance, except on the far left flank, where the 13th Division had managed to push forward for 490 ft (150 m). The 48th Division on the northern flank of XXI Corps, advanced for about 0.62 mi (1 km) and took its initial objectives in 25 minutes, in a costly attack. At zero hour, the 43rd Division on the left of XXI Corps, blew a mine under the German defences opposite and rushed the crater with few losses before the Germans could counter-attack.

D'Urbal ordered the attack to continue on 17 June, on the fronts of the 77th Division and IX Corps on either flank of XXXIII Corps, where the most advanced positions of the DM had become untenable. The attack was ordered for 4:00 p.m. and then postponed, leading to some units attacking too early, being pinned down in front of uncut wire and then being bombarded by French as well as German artillery. The 70th Division and the XXI Corps divisions, on the northern flank, took several German positions in costly attacks but the IX Corps attack on the southern flank was deluged with artillery and machine-gun fire and made no progress. On 18 June d'Urbal concentrated the remaining offensive capacity of the Tenth Army against Vimy Ridge. IX Corps was ordered to ignore the German defences in Neuville but General Balfourier the XX Corps commander, refused to attack with the northern flank unsupported. The attack on 18 June was another failure, in which French infantry were again confronted by German positions on reverse slopes, invisible to ground observation and undamaged, with uncut wire and alert defenders, who inflicted many casualties on the attackers. Foch suspended the offensive but d'Urbal reverted to piecemeal attacks for another week until Joffre intervened and ended the offensive.

==== Second Action of Givenchy ====
In the Second Action of Givenchy (15–16 June), IV Corps of the British First Army, attacked north-west of La Bassée with the 7th, 51st (Highland) and Canadian divisions after a 60-hour bombardment, in which an attempt to alleviate an acute ammunition shortage was made by relying on artillery observation and tactical reconnaissance by reinforced RFC squadrons. No covering fire was available for the attack and the German defenders were seen to have manned the front line before the advance began. The Germans opened massed small-arms fire but were not able to prevent the British from entering the German front trench, where a bombing fight began. German infantry were well-supplied with hand grenades but the British were isolated by cross-fire along no man's land and were pushed back as they ran out of ammunition, the last troops retiring at 4:00 a.m. A new attack on 15 June, using all of the artillery ammunition left was delayed by thick mist and the difficulty in reorganising the infantry but went ahead at 4:45 p.m. and took the German front line. The advance was stopped until the line was consolidated but the British and Canadian troops who had not been pinned down in their own trenches were forced back by a German counter-attack at 8:00 p.m. after which further attacks were cancelled.

==== First Attack on Bellewaarde ====
The British Second Army conducted the First Attack on Bellewaarde on 16 June with the 3rd Division, which took the German first line easily at 4:15 a.m. The second and third waves rushed forward and ran into the British bombardment, which was not seen by the gunners due to the amount of mist and smoke created by the bombardment. The British still managed to reach the German second line and three German counter-attacks had only managed to push the 3rd Division back to the first line, when the British ran short of ammunition. Support from a brigade of the 14th Division to exploit the success, was delayed by German artillery-fire and fewer than two battalions of the 3rd Division managed to advance at 3:30 p.m., up a flat open slope and were repulsed with many casualties. At 6:00 p.m. the German front trench from Menin road to Railway Wood was consolidated, which was short of Bellewaarde ridge and the German observation posts along it. Joffre criticised British "inaction", which enabled the Germans to concentrate resources against the Tenth Army.

=== German 6th Army ===
==== 9–14 May ====
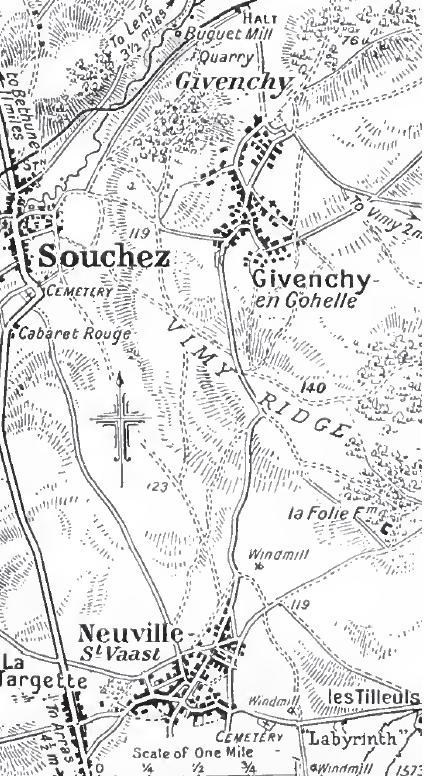
Souchez–Neuville St Vaast

The British First Army attacked in the Battle of Aubers Ridge, in support of the French offensive further south. North of La Bassée Canal, British artillery fire increased against the II Bavarian and XIX Saxon corps and at 6:00 a.m., an attack began against the 6th Bavarian Reserve Division and broke into the first line north of Fromelles. Fighting continued into the evening, when the trenches were recaptured. More British attacks occurred at Richbourg l'Avoué and at times penetrated to the German first line before being repulsed. Little ground was captured, none was held against German counter-attacks and German troops were soon sent south to reinforce the Arras front. French artillery bombarded the German lines overnight and then abated until 6:00 a.m. when a bombardment, slowly increasing in intensity began on the fronts of VII, XIV and I Bavarian Reserve corps, which from mid-morning reached the extent of Trommelfeuer. (Note: German time was one hour ahead of French time.)

Lulls in the fire were ruses to prompt German infantry to emerge from shelter, only to be caught in more Trommelfeuer; the German artillery reply was sparse. The French infantry assembled unseen and the advance began after several mines were sprung, obtaining a measure of surprise. The main French attack was received at 11:00 a.m. on the left of XIV Corps and against I Bavarian Reserve Corps, from Lens to Arras, as a second attack began against the centre of XIV Corps along the Béthune–Lens road, which was repulsed by a counter-attack. The 28th Division on the Lorette Spur, was forced out of the front trenches, with many losses and in the evening a battalion of Jäger was sent forward. Further south, the villages of Ablain-St Nazaire (Ablain) and Carency were held against determined French attacks. By noon 2.5 mi (4 km) of the German front defences had fallen and the French had penetrated up to a depth of 1.9 mi (3 km).

In the I Bavarian Reserve Corps area (General Karl von Fasbender), the 5th Bavarian Reserve Division (General Kress von Kressenstein) south of Carency, was pushed back to a line from Cabaret Rouge to Neuville St Vaast (Neuville) and French troops advanced as far as artillery positions around Givenchy-en-Gohelle (Givenchy), where reinforcements arrived at noon and managed to forestall a new French attack. To the south, the 1st Bavarian Reserve Division (Lieutenant-General Göringer) managed to repulse the French in hand-to-hand fighting and then enfilade the French further north, who had broken through at La Targette. Crown Prince Rupprecht applied to Falkenhayn, for the two divisions in OHL reserve and the 115th Division (Major-General von Kleist) was moved behind the 5th Bavarian Reserve Division. The 58th Division (Lieutenant-General von Gersdorf) went into the 6th Army reserve and closed up to Lens, as artillery also released from the OHL reserve came forward.

On the southern flank of the breakthrough, French attacks were also pushing slowly through the network of trenches known as the Labyrinthe. North of Ecurie, Bavarian Reserve Infantry Regiment 12 took over more ground to the north and prevented the French from widening the breakthrough and in Neuville St Vaast a counter-attack by a battalion of Bavarian Reserve Infantry Regiment 10 retook the east end of the village and many of the field guns which had been lost earlier. A defence line was improvised between Neuville and La Folie to the north and was used to engage the French troops further north with flanking fire. Bavarian Infantry Regiment 7 was rushed up from reserve to counter-attack the French on Vimy Ridge. The French were pushed back from the heights of Hill 145 and Hill 119 (the Pimple) by 1:00 p.m. (Note: "Hill 145" is referred to in old publications as "Hill 140".) At the east end of the Lorette Spur the 28th Division was forced out of the first position.

By afternoon, the left flank of XIV Corps had been uncovered near Carency. Rupprecht intended to use the remnants of the 5th Bavarian Reserve Division and the 115th Division to counter-attack and regain the lost positions. Instead, the 115th Division was sent to defend the right flank of the I Bavarian Reserve Corps and the 5th Bavarian Reserve Division was found to be too depleted to attack. Troops managed to counter-attack at Souchez and retook some ground, before being stopped by massed French artillery-fire around 8:00 p.m. By evening, Rupprecht knew that twelve French divisions had attacked four German divisions but believed that the French could be driven back. OHL sent the 117th Division to Douai and Rupprecht subordinated two regiments of the 58th Division to the I Bavarian Reserve Corps for the counter-attack at Souchez. Artillery was sent to the east of Vimy Ridge to support the attack.

During the night, a French attack captured the front trenches astride the Béthune–Lens road and Lieutenant-General von Haenisch sent the last corps reserve to the 29th Division (Lieutenant-General Isbert); a counter-attack in the morning recovered the trenches. To the south-west of Carency, the trench to Souchez was lost, which left Carency almost surrounded. Rupprecht and Haenisch planned to counter-attack from Souchez to Neuville, with the I Bavarian Reserve Corps and the 58th and 115th divisions, rather than retire. At 4:00 p.m. French attacks began on the Lorette Spur and at Carency but were not able to push back the defenders. At 7:00 p.m., the 58th Division began the German counter-attack, with parts of the 115th Division to the south and at first made good progress, before being stopped by French defensive fire. The 28th Division headquarters began to fear that the line between Ablain and Carency would fall.

On 10 May, the I Bavarian Reserve Division managed to retain its positions despite French attacks, particularly at Neuville on the right flank but several counter-attacks, supported by parts of IV Corps and the 115th Division, recovered only small parts of the village. Next day, Fasbender doubted that the line from Ablain to Carency could be held and asked for more reinforcements. Falkenhayn released the 117th Division (General Kuntze) and sent the VIII Corps headquarters with the 16th Division to Douai as a replacement of the OHL reserve. To avoid a retirement, which would lead to the loss of the Lorette Spur, Rupprecht met the corps commanders and issued a standfast order, encouraged by the quietude of the French during the morning of 11 May. French attacks in the afternoon were poorly co-ordinated and repulsed with many casualties. A captured order showed that the French were making a maximum effort to break through; a regiment of the 117th Division was made available to the 6th Army as a precaution and part of the 58th Division was moved closer to the 28th Division on the Lorette Spur.

On 11 May, Rupprecht was ordered by Falkenhayn not to retire under any circumstances, with the discretion to achieve this by attack or defence and Rupprecht replied that a counter-attack was not feasible. Next day, two regiments of the 117th Division were added to I Bavarian Reserve Corps to protect Neuville and reinforcements arriving to re-establish the OHL reserve behind the 6th Army were taken over; part of the 15th Division was sent to Douai as a new OHL reserve and Falkenhayn suggested that a special headquarters be set up to co-ordinate counter-attacks. Two liaison officers arrived from OHL to look into the possibility of a counter-attack by the two most endangered corps, which undermined the authority of the 6th Army HQ and Falkenhayn notified Rupprecht that a fresh corps en route should be used to counter-attack. Rupprecht took exception to this, inferring that it was a veiled criticism of Karl von Fassbender, the commander of the I Bavarian Reserve Corps. Rupprecht blamed Falkenhayn for ignoring warnings that the Bavarians needed reinforcing. On 13 June, Rupprecht repeated his orders to XIV Corps to hold Carency and Haenisch sent pioneers to dig a reserve trench behind the left flank of the 28th Division. French pressure on the Lorette Spur had eased and a regiment of the 58th Division retook trenches on the northern slope. No counter-attack was possible at Carency and the I Bavarian Reserve Corps concentrated on holding the line from Souchez to Neuville and St Laurent, which was attacked again during the afternoon.

Gaps either side of Hill 123 were closed by counter-attacks but a gap between a depression known as Artilleriemulde, north of the Lorette Spur and Souchez could not be closed and Carency was almost surrounded. The defences to the west and south had been lost on 9 May and constant French attacks slowly overwhelmed the defenders. At 9:00 a.m. on 12 May, a French bombardment of 23,000 shells fell on the remaining German positions to the north of the village. The survivors were cut off and the village captured over the next two days. French attacks in the north began to diminish on 13 May, as rain storms turned the battlefield into a swamp but at 2:00 p.m. on 15 May a hurricane bombardment fell on Souchez until 6:00 p.m. but no infantry attack followed the bombardment.

Late on 12 May Rupprecht created Armee–Gruppe Fasbender to control the units in the areas of the XIV and I Bavarian Reserve corps, to hold the existing positions and establish a defence line from Carency and Neuville. A counter-attack at the cemetery south of Souchez but failed without support from the Carency area, where a French attack at dusk had captured the village. The defeat threatened the rest of the German line, Haenish ordered an immediate bombardment of the village and the 28th Division to dig a new line, from the Lorette Spur to the Ablain church and Souchez. A battalion of the 117th Division was sent to the 28th Division and a 16th Division regiment was moved to Lens as a replacement. By 13 June, the right flank of the 28th Division still held the northern slope of the Lorette Spur, the line either side of the Lorette Chapel had been lost from the Schlammulde (Muddy Hollow) to the Ablain track. Most of Ablain had been captured but French attempts to advance further, had been repulsed in mutually costly fighting and a lull occurred, except for a small French attack at Neuville during the day.

Rupprecht rated the 29th Division as worn out, the condition of the 28th Division as not much better and the 5th Bavarian Reserve Division as exhausted. The 1st Bavarian Reserve Division, 58th and 115th divisions were severely damaged and c. 20,000 casualties had been incurred from 9 to 13 May. Rupprecht requested more reinforcements to replace all of the worn-out divisions and Falkenhayn began to strip more units from the Western Front. Falkenhayn also appointed General Ewald von Lochow, the III Corps commander to control the units being sent to the 6th Army. (Note: Falkenhayn wrote that an energetic commander was needed and nominated Claer, someone he knew that Rupprecht felt had failed. Falkenhayn then sent Lochow to command three of the 6th Army corps. Rupprecht formally complained to the Kaiser on 17 May against Falkenhayn for tampering with his authority and received a reply on 23 May from the Kaiser agreeing with him and an apology from Falkenhayn. On 19 May, Krafft von Delmensingen had been woken and abruptly transferred to the Italian front with Colonel Gustav von Lambsdorff parachuted in to replace him.) The 117th Division began to relieve the 28th Division on the night of 13/14 May and the 5th Bavarian Reserve Division remnants were relieved during the day. General Julius Riemann the VIII Corps commander, took over the 16th, 58th, 115th and part of the 15th divisions from Souchez to Neuville. The reinforcement of the 6th Army had drained the OHL reserve and further claims by Rupprecht were refused, which led him to complain to the Kaiser.

==== Armee-Gruppe Lochow ====
North of the Lorette Spur and in the area of the 1st Bavarian Reserve Division, most of the old front line was intact. North of the Carency stream, XIV Corps held parts of the front line in Schlammulde, along Barrikadenweg (Barricade Way) and the east end of Ablain. South of the stream, the line was held by a mixture of the 58th and 115th divisions, the remnants of the 5th Bavarian Reserve Division and a regiment of the 52nd Reserve Infantry Brigade. In reserve, the 16th Division (Lieutenant-General Fuchs) was ready to move into line from Souchez to Hill 123 on a 1.2 mi (2 km) front, the 15th Division and the new 1st Trench Mortar Battalion had arrived in the 6th Army area. Lochow took over from 14 May to 12 June and continued to reorganise mingled units and withdraw tired troops into reserve. Artillery command in each area was centralised for barrage fire, counter-battery bombardments and flanking fire into other areas. The 5th Bavarian Reserve and 58th divisions were relieved by the 16th Division and three corps sectors established, XIV Corps on the right with the 117th Division and 85th Reserve Brigade, VIII Corps with the 115th and 58th divisions from the Carency stream to the Arras–Lens road and the 1st Bavarian Reserve Corps, with the 1st Bavarian Reserve Division and 52nd Infantry Brigade, from the road to the Scarpe river.

Lochow planned a counter-attack by XIV Corps to regain the commanding ground of the Lorette Spur, which took place from 15 to 17 May and succeeded only in exhausting the 117th Division, which had to be withdrawn. Air reconnaissance observed huge numbers of French guns and troops arriving at Doullens station, which showed that the French offensive would continue. A counter-attack to capture Ecurie to disrupt the French artillery effort was considered and rejected due to the shortage of troops. Only at Neuville could troops assemble unseen and have good artillery observation. The 15th Division (Major-General Vollbrecht) at Neuville, was reinforced with troops from the 115th Division and attacked at 8:30 p.m. on 22 May; despite a 1st Trench Mortar Battalion bombardment and flame thrower support, the attack was a costly failure. To the south, the defence of the Labyrinthe continued, with frequent attacks to recover the first position in the centre, to relieve the right flank, which had been enveloped on three sides but without which Neuville could not be held. Bavarian Reserve Infantry Brigade 2 managed to assemble troops for a counter-attack towards the Lossow-Arkaden and advanced for about 490 ft (150 m) before being repulsed. French attacks in the opposite direction up to six times each day also failed, except for some ground on the Thélus road on the evening of 11 May. German reinforcements which had just arrived, were rushed forward to block the French advance on Thélus. The British attacked on the night of 15/16 May, south of Neuve Chapelle and by 20 May, had advanced 1.9 mi (3 km) and drawn in German reinforcements, which were able to defeat British attacks from 20–21 May over the Estaires–La Bassée road.

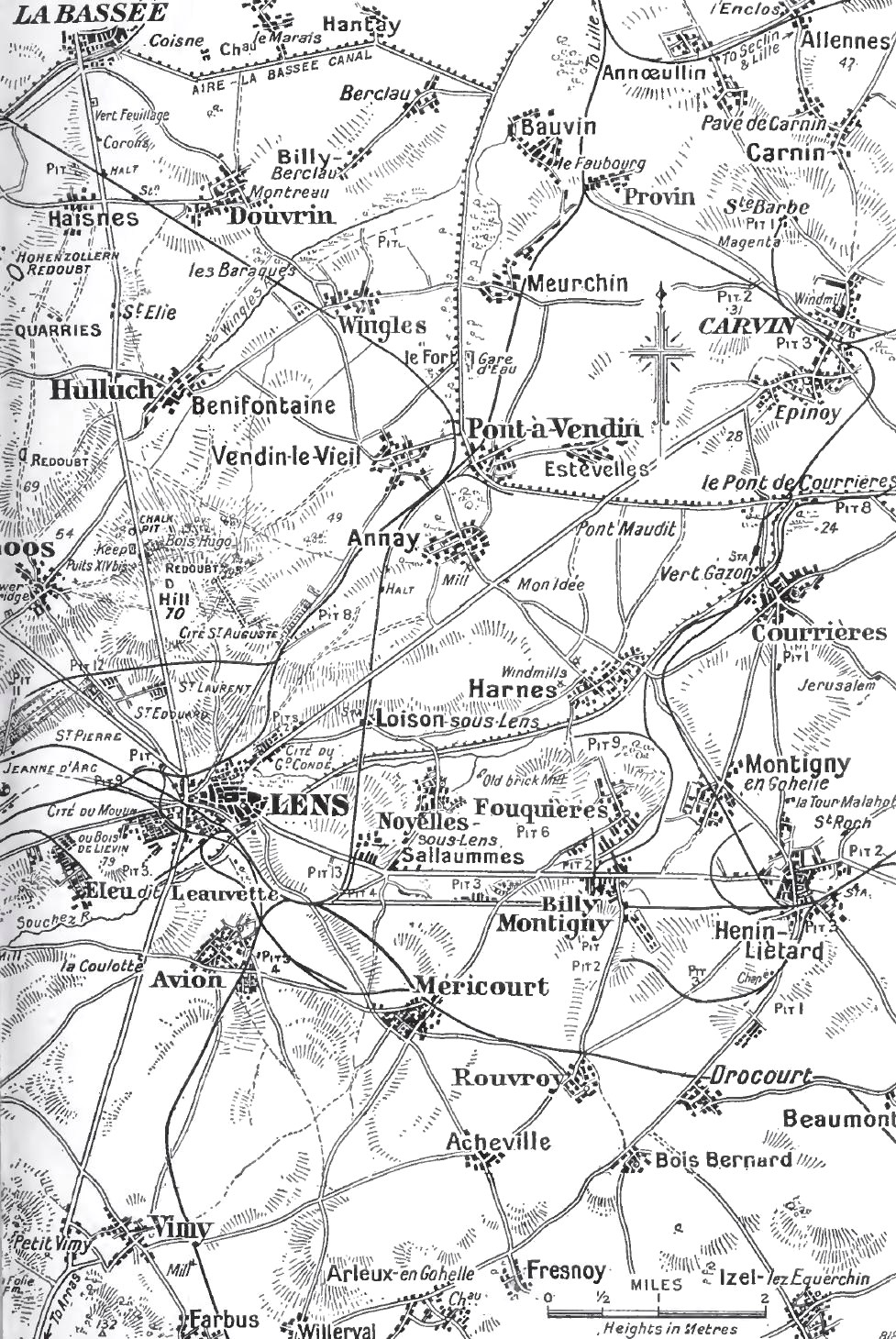
Artois in 1915

The French offensive had severely eroded the 6th Army, which had used up all the fresh units sent from the OHL reserve in France. The 2nd Guard Reserve Division was diverted to VII Corps opposite the British and units worn out by the French supporting attacks beyond Artois were needed, before they had been rested. Only the tired 111th Division, 123rd Division and 8th Bavarian Reserve Division remained in the OHL reserve. Artillery reinforcements increased the firepower of the 6th Army, from 100 heavy howitzers and 74 heavy guns to 209 heavy howitzers and 98 heavy guns by 22 May, with plenty of ammunition. From 9 to 19 May, the 6th Army had fired 508,000 field artillery and 105,000 heavy shells. On 19 May, Krafft von Delmensingen, the 6th Army chief of staff, was replaced by Colonel von Wenge and sent to Italy with the new Alpenkorps.

At the Lorette Spur, the 117th Division was sent forward to relieve the 28th Division on 18 May, from the Schlammulde (Muddy Hollow) to Ablain and the south end of Souchez. Most of the trenches had been demolished and those near the river were 2 ft (0.61 m) deep in water. Delivery of supplies was intermittent, because field kitchens had to be set up well back to avoid shellfire. The remaining defences had been improvised between attacks many were overlooked from a flank and some from French positions behind them. A big attack on 21 May, pushed the defenders back and a counter-attack failed to restore the position, which was re-established further back along a track at the northern fringe of Ablain. Trenches were dug forwards towards the Lorette Spur, which gave some flank protection. II Battalion, Infantry Regiment 157 was severely depleted in the fighting and was relieved by units from six regiments. Constant French attacks slowly forced the surviving defenders back but the consequences of losing ground north-west of Souchez were so dangerous, that a stream of German units were sent to hold the area between late May and 7 June.

After several days of minor operations, French infantry attacked from the Lorette Spur to the Scarpe at 4:00 p.m. From Ecurie southwards, the French were seen assembling and bombarded, which stopped the attack in no man's land. In the north, several footholds were gained and only recaptured during the night. Lochow requested more reinforcements, IV Corps south of Arras with the 8th and 7th divisions, was exchanged with two burnt-out divisions and the 111th Division took over the line from the 8th Division; the 115th Division was relieved at Neuville by the 58th Division. French attacks continued from 25 to 26 May, from Liévin to Souchez which captured German trenches, then lost them to German counter-attacks. On 27 May, Ablain cemetery and trenches to the south were lost, which made the village untenable and on 28 May, the Germans retired to a line either side of the sugar refinery west of Souchez. Local attacks continued and on 29 May, a French attack up the road from Aix-Noulette to Souchez was repulsed by Reserve Infantry Brigade 85. Lochow suspected that the attack was a ruse and next day the French attacked further south.

On 30 May, French artillery-fire fell in the south and extended into the VIII Corps area, before an attack at 5:00 p.m. from Souchez to Roclincourt, which was eventually repulsed. Late on 31 May, trenches between Angres, the Carency stream and the sugar refinery were lost and only the trenches to the north were recaptured on 1 June after many counter-attacks. During the evening, an attack from Neuville to Tsingtao Trench captured the trench, which threatened the German hold on the Labyrinthe. Lochow put Fasbinder in command with the 58th Division and moved the 15th Division to Neuville. British diversionary attacks around Givenchy-lez-la-Bassée, continued during early June and were repulsed in costly fighting by VII and XIX corps. In Armee-Gruppe Lochow, the battle for the Labyrinthe continued and from 4 to 6 June, the French attacked Neuville. After an attack on 8 June, the defenders retired to a trench further east. French attacks on the Lorette Spur were co-ordinated with those at Neuville and exhausted the XIV Corps troops, which were replaced by the 7th and 8th divisions of IV Corps, which had been reserved for a counter-attack.

To the south, the French had taken the cemetery at Neuville and built a strong point, from which attacks on the rest of Neuville were made, threatening the German hold on the Labyrinthe, 4,900 ft (1,500 m) to the south. By 7 June the defence of Neuville had begun to collapse, despite exhortations from the German high command that the area was to be held at all costs. Officers of the 58th Division wanted permission to withdraw from the village but freedom to make a temporary limited withdrawal in a crisis was given but only to organise a counter-attack. The north-west of the village fell on 8 June, after the last defenders of Infantry Regiment 160 were bombarded by their own artillery. A battalion of the 15th Division was sent to counter-attack a French salient, near the Lossow-Arkade in the Labyrinthe, as soon as it arrived on the Artois front, supported by grenade teams and flame-thrower detachments. The attack failed but the Tsingtau-Graben and some ground at the Labyrinthe was recovered. French attacks at the Labyrinthe were as frequent as those further north and the 1st Bavarian Reserve Division counter-attacked in the early hours of 11 June, which recaptured a trench.

French preparations for another general attack were observed by the German defenders and large amounts of artillery ammunition were brought forward. On 10 June the senior gunner in the 15th Division predicted a French attack from Vimy to La Folie, Thélus and Neuville St Vaast, which if successful, would lead to the loss of the German artillery around Vimy and La Folie. No forces were available for a spoiling attack and at Roclincourt, Reserve Infantry Regiment 99 had watched the French sapping forward to within 200 ft (60 m) of their positions and endured the French preparatory bombardment. The French shelling grew in weight until 11:30 a.m. when a mine was sprung. French infantry attacked, broke into the position and the defenders built flanking barricades to prevent the French from rolling up the flanks of the German position. Other German troops formed a blocking position in front of the French penetration and the German artillery bombarded the lost ground and no man's land, to prevent French reserves from moving forward. Counter-attacks by troops held back in reserve were able to push the French out of their footholds but at the cost of "grievous" losses.

==== 16–18 June ====
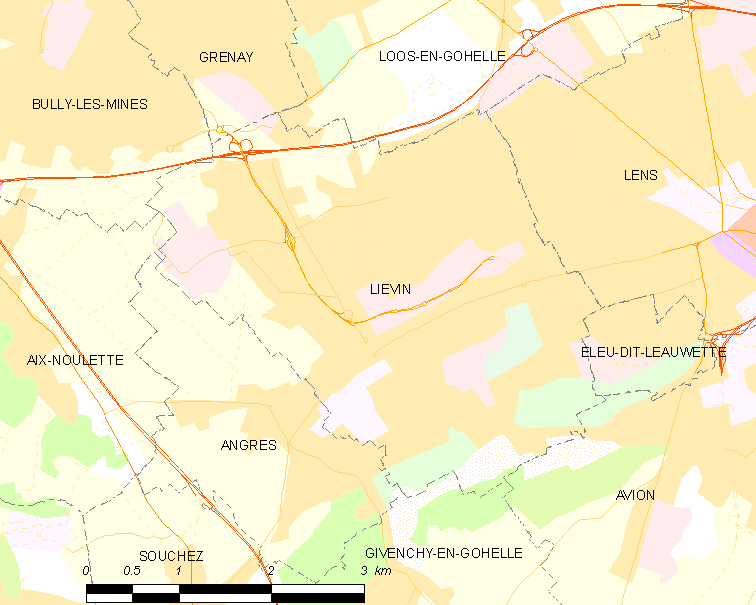
Map of the Liévin–Angres area (commune FR insee code 62510)

On 7 June, Falkenhayn met the 6th Army commanders and accepted their claim that only with fresh troops would the 6th Army hold its positions. The 5th and 123rd divisions were sent to the 6th Army and XIX Saxon Corps was relieved by IV Corps on 14 June. The 117th Division was moved from the Lorette Spur beyond the Béthune–Lens road for a rest but around Liévin and Angres, the 7th Division (Lieutenant-General Riedel) and 8th Division (Major-General von Hanstein) held decrepit trenches which could not be repaired at night because French searchlights illuminated the ground to catch German troops in the open. At Schlammulde south of the Aix-Noulette–Souchez road was relatively protected from French artillery-fire but was covered in corpses, which revolted the troops who could not bury the dead. Many attempts were made to close a 980 ft (300 m) gap to a switch trench, which led towards the sugar refinery and Souchez. Two breastworks had been built near the Château and more fortifications had been built in Souchez. An absence of attacks in the 16th Division area had been used to repair the defences from Souchez to Hill 123 but the trenches in the 5th Division (Major-General von Gabain) area were derelict.

In the I Bavarian Reserve Corps area, the 58th Division still held much of the Labyrinthe and to the south the 1st Bavarian Reserve Division and the exhausted 52nd Reserve Infantry Brigade, which had held the line since the beginning of the offensive were still in the original front line, although the trenches were severely damaged. The German artillery had been reorganised into divisional groups and batteries south of the Scarpe, maintained flanking fire on the French guns north of the river. A new trench line ordered by Lochow had been dug from Loos to Lens, Vimy and Thélus and a new line was planned east of Lens to Oppy and Feuchy, far enough back to negate the tactical advantage of artillery support from Vimy Ridge, should it be captured. Signs of another French attack increased and on 14 June, French reconnaissance patrols were active from Angres to Neuville and French artillery-fire grew in intensity. Super-heavy shells sufficient to penetrate concrete shelters fell in Souchez, Givenchy, Thélus and Farbus, destroying command posts and staging areas. At dawn on 16 June, much of the German wire had been cut, many trenches had been demolished and the defending infantry had suffered many casualties. At noon, the French attacked from Liévin to the Scarpe, with little return fire from the German artillery, which had been suppressed by counter-battery fire and under observation from French aircraft, which flew overhead unchallenged.

Late on 16 June, the French attacked in a smoke-screen and reached the forward German positions, where several footholds was gained and protected by box-barrages. German counter-attacks later in the evening eliminated one foothold and took 205 prisoners but further to the left a French foothold was maintained by the weight of covering artillery-fire. By night, the French had consolidated in the 7th Division trenches at Liévin and Angres. The German survivors in the Schlammulde, between Angres and the chapel at Notre Dame de Lorette, were forced back. House-to-house fighting continued in Souchez and in the 16th Division area, where the front line for 0.62 mi (1 km) had been lost. Some French troops reached German artillery positions, beyond which were no trench defences.

Against the 5th Division in the south, the French attacks collapsed but the 58th Division at the Labyrinthe and areas just to the south were broken through. In counter-attacks during the night by Armee-Gruppe Lochow, the 7th Division recaptured trenches at Liévin and Angres but failed to the south-west and at Schlammulde. The 8th Division regained the second Lorette switch line and the 16th Division cleared a few isolated penetrations but not the area south of Souchez; artillery-fire prevented the digging of a switch trench. A continuous barrage (Dauerfeur) was maintained on the breakthrough, which prevented the French advancing further, except at the churchyard at Souchez and by dawn the Labyrinthe had been recaptured. About 700 French prisoners were taken.

The 6th Army was reduced to a desperate position and OHL sent VI Corps units forward as they arrived. On 17 June the French attack resumed and broke into the 5th Division defences and was then pushed out from there and either side by counter-attacks. A French advance to the north along the Aix-Noulette–Souchez road made Schlammulde untenable and it was abandoned overnight; Marokkanerwäldchen (Moroccan Copse) on the Arras–Béthune road was lost. There were many German casualties and the 16th Division was relieved by the 11th Division of VI Corps; the 58th Division was kept in line for lack of a replacement. OHL provided the 15th Division, which had had only a few days' rest and the 123rd Division in an emergency. The 12th Division of VI Corps could not hasten its arrival before 19 June and the 187th Infantry Brigade was hurried north, the 53rd Reserve Division relieved the 3rd Bavarian Division which then replaced the 58th Division and another thirteen heavy batteries were sent to the 6th Army. Armee-Gruppe Lochow held the north with the IV Corps headquarters, the 117th and 123rd Saxon divisions on the right, the 7th and 8th divisions on the left and the 3rd Ersatz Brigade in reserve.

VIII Corps held the central area with the 11th and 5th divisions, the 12th Division (Lieutenant-General Martin Chales de Beaulieu) to join on the northern flank and the 6th Division in 6th Army reserve when it arrived. The 3rd Bavarian, 1st Bavarian and 5th Bavarian Reserve divisions held the southern area and the 15th and 16th divisions were to be withdrawn. French attacks on 18 June, were smaller and optimism rose that the offensive was ending. OHL ordered that the defences were to be thinned quickly, to provide a new strategic reserve. The 6th Army headquarters and Lochow protested that the troop reductions were premature and on 24 June, Lochow predicted more attacks, emphasised the need for a flow of fresh divisions and that the number of casualties required consideration of a retirement to the new defence line behind Vimy Ridge. Until the end of June, the Germans tried to restore their front positions but failed to regain the Lorette Spur and the French artillery maintained a bombardment from Angres to Souchez. The 12th Division was brought forward to reinforce the area and French attacks on 25 July and 27 June were repulsed by counter-attacks.

In the old 16th Division area south of Souchez, the 11th Division gradually recaptured the area lost on 16 June. Fighting at the Labyrinthe continued until 24 June, when the 3rd Bavarian Division restored the old front line. The exhausted 52nd Reserve Infantry Brigade was relieved on 25 June and on 28 June Armee-Gruppe Lochow was dissolved and replaced by the VI Corps headquarters (General Kurt von Pritzelwitz). The Arras front remained the most important area on the German Western Front and Falkenhayn planned to send divisions from the Eastern Front to protect against another Franco-British offensive. Rupprecht claimed that the 6th Army could hold its ground without reinforcement and the redeployments were cancelled. During July skirmishing took place around Souchez but the French offensive was not resumed. In August, the Western Army was reorganised, more units moved into reserve and a programme of trench digging was begun along all of the Western Front.

=== Air operations ===
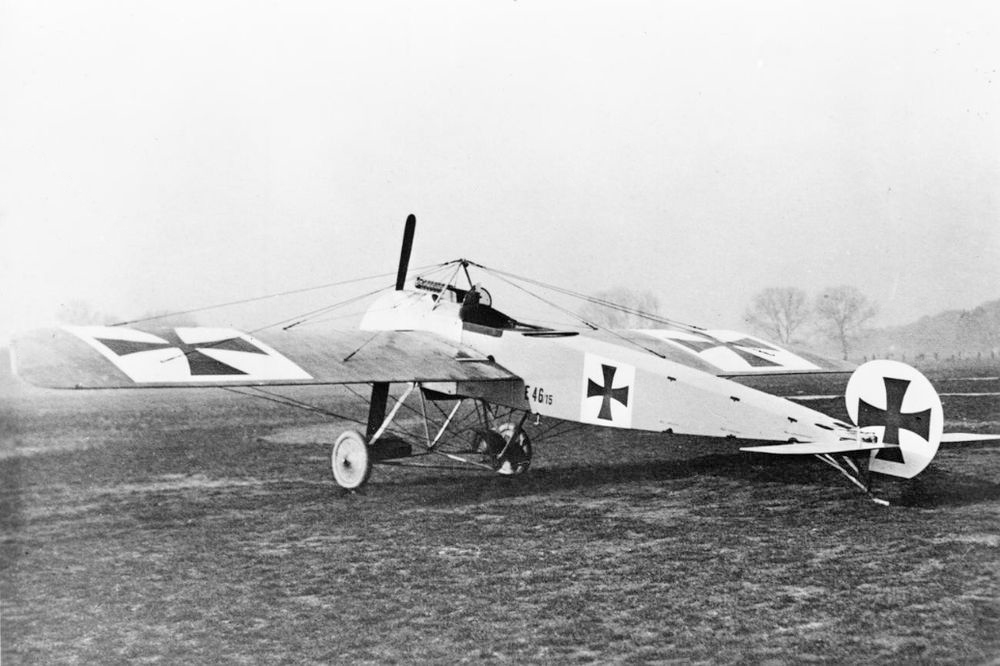
Fokker Eindecker I

On 11 March, Major Hermann von der Lieth-Thomsen was appointed Chef des Feldflugwesens (Chief of Field Air Forces) and began to increase the size of Die Fliegertruppen des deutschen Kaiserreiches (Imperial German Flying Corps), with the formation of five new air units in Germany to provide replacements and expedite the introduction of the new Fokker E.I aircraft. New links between air units and the army were created, by the appointment of a staff officer for aviation to each army and in April, armed C-class aircraft began to reach front-line units. Reconnaissance aircraft detected increased movement behind the French Tenth Army front and more C-class aircraft were sent to the 6th Army, from the armies in quiet areas of the Western Front. Early on 9 May, French aircraft bombed the 6th Army headquarters at La Madeleine en Lille and railway stations in the town, with little effect. By 19 May, German aircraft reinforcements could make reconnaissance flights behind the French front and reported massive concentrations of artillery and the assembly of troops at the Doullens railway station, which were interpreted as signs of another big French offensive.

=== French supporting attacks ===
The French made secondary attacks along the Western Front, to pin down German reserves as part of the general action, intended to complement the decisive action at Arras. The Second Army attacked a German salient west of Serre on a 1.2 mi (1.9 km) front at Toutvent Farm, 19 mi (30 km) south of Souchez, from 7 to 13 June, against the 52nd Division and gained 3,000 ft (900 m) on a 1.2 mi (2 km) front, at a cost of 10,351 casualties, 1,760 being killed; German casualties were c. 4,000 men. On 10 and 19 July, the 28th Reserve Division repulsed attacks near Fricourt. The 6th Army attacked a salient south of Quennevières near Noyon, from 6 to 16 June and advanced 1,600 ft (500 m) on a 0.62 mi (1 km) front, with 7,905 casualties; the German 18th Division suffered 1,763 casualties. German attacks in the Argonne from 20 June, captured French positions at La Hazarée and another attack on 13 July, captured high ground west of Boureuilles and near Le Four de Paris. The German attacks took 6,663 prisoners from 20 June.

In the south-east, the First Army attacked the Saint-Mihiel salient from 1 May to 20 June. The 9th Division was pushed back to the second line by five French attacks; after several more attacks, the neighbouring 10th Division relieved the pressure on the Grande Tranchée de Calonne road, with an attack on the Bergnase (Les Éparges) on 26 June. The Germans gained a commanding position, from which counter-attacks were repulsed on 3 and 6 July. The French operations gained a small amount of ground for c. 16,200 casualties. About 43 mi (70 km) beyond St Mihiel, The Army Detachment of Lorraine attacked from 5 to 22 June, advancing 3,300–4,900 ft (1,000–1,500 m) on a 3.1 mi (5 km) front and then 6,600 ft (2,000 m) on an 5.0 mi (8 km) front, with 32,395 casualties. On 7 July, the III Bavarian Corps counter-attacked west of Apremont, captured French front trenches and resisted French attacks until 12 July, inflicting many losses. In late June, French attacks captured Gondrexon and next day the German 30th Reserve Division captured a hill at Ban-de-Sapt, until French counter-attacks on 8 and 24 July.

The Seventh Army attacked 12 mi (20 km) to the west of Colmar from 5 May to 22 June and advanced 1.9 mi (3 km) on a 2.8 mi (4.5 km) front. Attacks on high ground west of Metzeral from 5 to 7 May were repulsed but on 14 June the heights and the village of Sondernach were captured. Metzeral fell several days later and on 22 June, the Germans retired from the west bank of the Fecht to a line from Mühlbach east to the Hilsenfirst. The French suffered 6,667 casualties and the 19th Reserve Division with attached units suffered 3,676. An attack on the Barrenkopf and Reichsackerkopf from 20 to 22 July failed but the Lingekopf was captured on 27 July; local fighting went on at the Barrenkopf into August. The supporting attacks had minimal artillery support, took less ground than the Tenth Army and cost another 37,500 casualties, about 40 per cent of the casualties incurred in Artois. (Note: From June, local French attacks on the Artois front continued against the German defences across the plain to the Béthune–La Bassée Canal. South of the Lorette Spur, French attacks advanced from the sugar refinery to the outskirts of Souchez. In the area of Neuville, constant fighting went on in the Labyrinthe.)

== Aftermath ==
=== Analysis ===
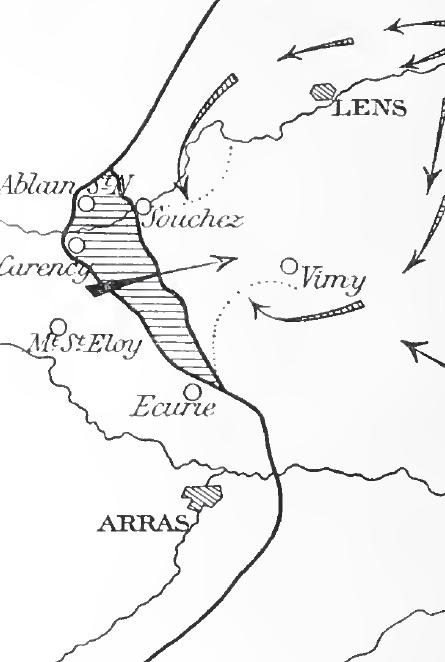
Tenth Army offensive and German counter-attacks, 9 May – 18 June

On 9 May, five French corps had attacked two German divisions on a 16 mi (25 km) front and advanced 2.5 mi (4 km) on the front of the 5th Bavarian Reserve Division between the Lorette Spur and La Targette. The 77th Division and the DM of XXXIII Corps penetrated between Carency and Neuville, overran Landwehr Regiment 39 and captured Hill 145, the highest point on Vimy Ridge The DM was then repulsed by local counter-attacks from Bavarian Infantry Regiment 7, which had been rushed forward from reserve. From 9 to 12 May the Tenth Army made the largest advance since trench warfare began, using the new tactics which caused the German defenders great difficulty, even on the flanks where the attacks were repulsed. The extent and tempo of the French plans proved too ambitious, given the material constraints affecting the Tenth Army and French munitions production. XXXIII Corps was forced off Vimy Ridge by German artillery-fire and flanking fire from Souchez and Neuville. A considerable tactical advantage had been gained by the French, who had regained 6.2 sq mi (16 km^{2}) of ground before the offensive was terminated.

Foch wrote a report in early August in which he explained that the failure to hold Hill 145 was due to XXXIII Corps and the Tenth Army reserves being too distant and not deployed according to a proper reinforcement plan. At the beginning of the attack the XXXIII Corps reserve was a brigade of the DM, with a regiment at Mont St Éloi, 1.9 mi (3 km) behind the front and a regiment at Acq 3.7 mi (6 km) back, to keep them out of German artillery range. Three battalions were sent forward at 1:00 p.m., half a battalion at 3:30 p.m. and the rest of the battalion at 4:00 p.m. to assist in consolidation and to be ready to defeat German counter-attacks, not to press on. The nearest Tenth Army reserve was the 18th Division, 7.5 mi (12 km) away. Foch wrote that no-one had expected the DM to advance 2.5 mi (4 km) in an hour.

The slow and piecemeal arrival of reserves was made worse by the failure of the supporting attack to the north by the British First Army, which was defeated on 9 May at the Battle of Aubers Ridge. Subsequently, the British offensive was postponed until the Battle of Festubert on 16 May which resulted in the capture of the village and an advance of 3 km (1.9 mi). From 21 April to 25 May, the British Second Army was engaged against the German 4th Army, in the Second Battle of Ypres which diverted British resources from the First Army. After 11 May, the Tenth Army began methodical local attacks, in which tactically important ground was attacked piecemeal, until another general attack could be made on Vimy Ridge. First-class French divisions had lost many experienced soldiers, which reduced them to mediocrity; the methods of Note 5779 had not been adopted consistently and became a greater problem when replacement troops with no experience, tried to continue the offensive.

The attempt in June to capture Vimy Ridge with another set-piece attack was a costly failure, despite the intervening period of local attacks on the flanks of XXXIII Corps and the capture of the Lorette Spur. French tactics were unchanged and the constant local attacks left no time for training. Revisions to the stipulations of Note 5779 in mid-June were of minor significance and an amendment of 18 June only referred to the importance of cavalry in mobile warfare. German defensive changes were easy to implement quickly and by June had made the French methods of May obsolete. For as long as the Germans were able to retain Souchez and Neuville, French attacks between them could not capture Vimy Ridge and the defences of the villages were too formidable to be overcome quickly. The original plan for a series of attacks might have been able to remove Souchez and Neuville as obstacles but the material constraints on the French in the spring of 1915, meant that the plan devised by Foch could not be implemented.

In September Foch wrote of the speed with which the Germans had moved reinforcements into the area from 9 to 18 May, dug new defensive lines and brought more heavy artillery into action, which from 18 May maintained barrages along the Tenth Army front. By 20 May the French artillery was dominated by the German artillery reinforcements, which severely inhibited the consolidation of captured ground and preparations for more attacks. Despite the change from attempts at continuous battle to methodical attacks, with pauses to reorganise and consolidate, the French took less ground, fewer prisoners and suffered more casualties. Foch concluded that a breakthrough was unlikely until the German armies in France had been depleted to a far greater extent; he advocated small step-by-step attacks, using methodical and economical methods. Fayolle wrote that the advocates of continuous battle were subject to a "grand illusion" and criticised Foch and d'Urbal for making unrealistic demands. André Laffargue, an artillery officer, was prompted to write Étude sur l'attaque dans le période actuelle de la guerre, an example of the trend to artillery-based tactics and infiltration by infantry.

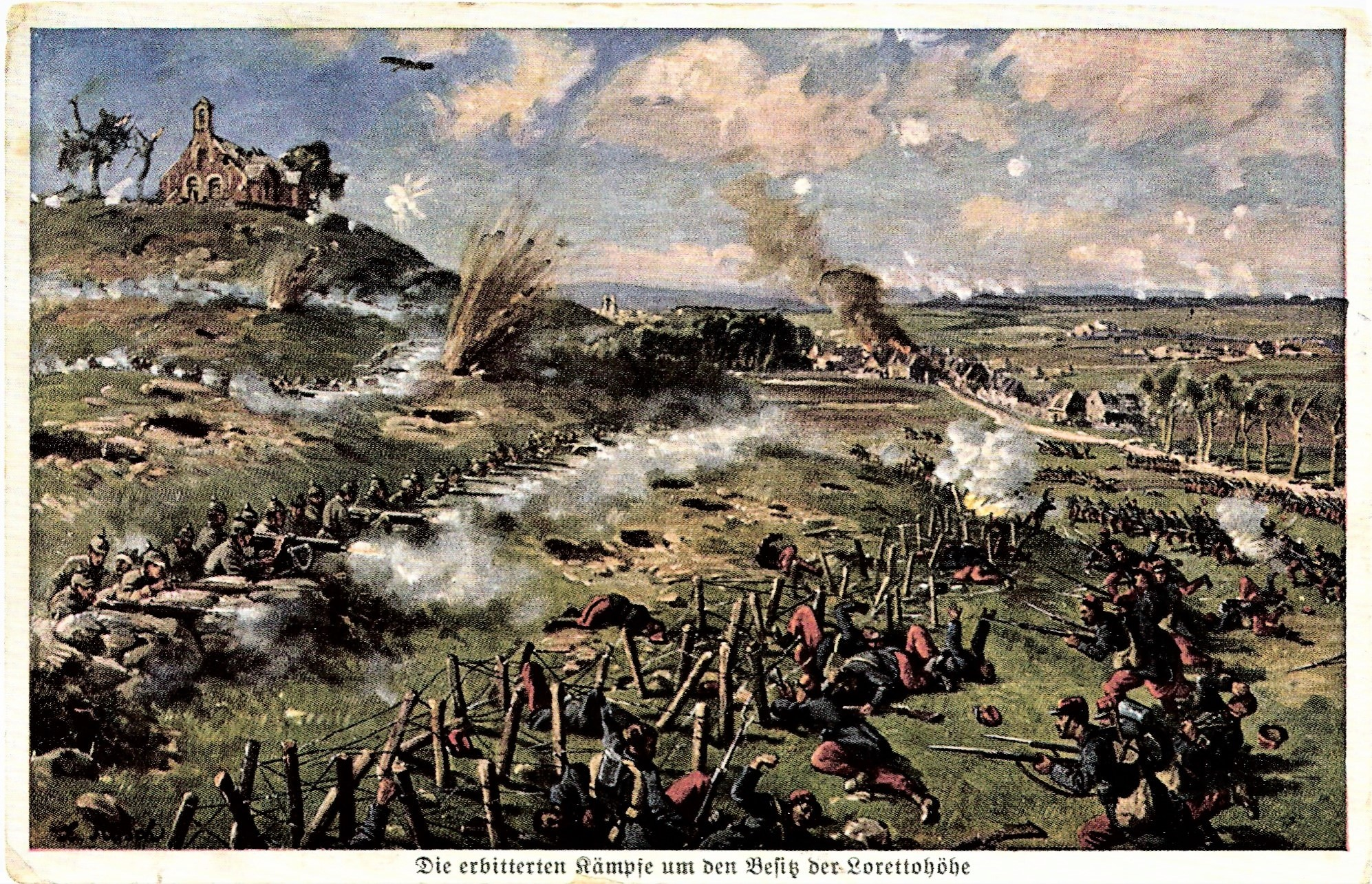
Lorettohöhen (Notre Dame de Lorette)

From 10 to 16 June the French fired 497,122 shells with less effect than the 265,430 rounds fired from 3 to 9 May. The Germans had managed to fire a heavy artillery barrage of c. 100,000 shells, which stopped the French infantry attack and prevented troops moving up in support. Attempts to repeat the surprise of 9 May by ruses failed and a German counter-barrage had begun in no man's land within two minutes of the French infantry advance. The experience of the attacks on 16 June demonstrated that the effect of counter-battery fire, neutralising fire and changes in the pattern and timing of artillery-fire made no difference if the German wire was uncut when the infantry advance began. German field defences were dug in increasing quantity and complexity during the offensive and German artillery became much more active, as more guns and much more ammunition arrived at the battlefront.

The new German defences around the area were on ground overlooked from the Lorette Spur, were more costly to defend and made Vimy Ridge more vulnerable to attack. The apparent lost opportunity on 9 May, when Vimy Ridge was captured in the first rush, led the French army commanders to conclude that more of the same could achieve a breakthrough if better organised, which formed the basis of the planning for the autumn offensives in Artois and Champagne. Pétain wrote that the attack on 9 May showed that a breakthrough was possible and that it could be achieved by careful preparation of communication trenches, jumping-off trenches and assembly positions, if the German defences were carefully reconnoitred and sufficiently bombarded by artillery. Since the defenders could close a gap quickly it would be necessary to maintain momentum, with reserve troops following up the attacking force closely. Attacks in open country were preferable to being bogged down in fighting for obstacles like villages and woods and the attack should be on a broad front, to allow centres of resistance to be outflanked and to disperse German firepower over a wider area.

German analysis of the battle was collected in a memorandum of June 1915 and led to renewed emphasis on infantry shelters, deep enough to be invulnerable to heavy artillery and to increase the number of defensive positions behind the front, which would slow an advance and delay subsequent attacks, by forcing the attacker to move artillery into range. On 7 June a copy of Note 5779 was captured on the Artois front and the local corps commander ordered that intensive digging be undertaken and stipulated that reserve positions were to be as solidly built as front line defences. Much of the new digging on the rest of the Western Front was done on reverse slopes, invisible to ground observers and capable of being engaged only by howitzer-fire. The French methods of attack had been made obsolete by the time of the resumption of the offensive in September 1915, when many French troops were killed on such slopes, in front of uncut wire, before an undamaged second position.

=== Casualties ===
French sources put casualties from 3 May to 18 June at 102,500 of whom 35,000 men were killed; another 37,500 casualties were incurred in secondary operations. The German official historians of the Reichsarchiv recorded c. 102,500 French casualties from 9 May to 18 June, 32,000 British casualties and 73,072 German casualties. Jack Sheldon recorded the same figures for French casualties, quoting the French official history and c. 30,000 casualties for the German divisions most involved in the battle (1st and 5th Bavarian Reserve divisions, 3rd Bavarian, 5th, 11th, 15th, 16th and 115th divisions) noting that some figures are estimates believed to be too low but that the total was far fewer than French losses. (Note: François Faber, winner of the 1909 Tour de France, died in the battle on 9 May 1915.) In 2013 Jonathan Krause recorded ranges of 100,000–121,000 French and 50,000–80,000 German casualties.

=== Subsequent operations ===
The battle had great influence on the French army during the preparations for the autumn offensive of 1915 in Champagne and Artois, which were also based on an assumption that strategic victories were possible after one or two days of offensive action. Joffre ordered another 5,500 machine-guns, to double the number per brigade by 1 January 1916. Production of the 240 mm Trench Mortar (240 mm (9.4 in)) and 340 mm (13 in) trench mortar was increased and manufacture began of artillerie lourde à grande puissance (ALGP, long-range heavy guns); production of 75 mm ammunition was reduced to increase quality and large orders were placed for aircraft and for gas shells. The growth of French war production by September 1915, enabled the French to attack in two places simultaneously.

At the end of June, Joffre discussed strategy with the army group commanders and Pétain, who had been promoted to the command of the Second Army. Foch again advocated a series of limited attacks, particularly in Artois where strategically important railways were relatively close behind the German lines. (Note: In 1916 Foch wrote La Battaille Offensive which evolved from Note 5779 and the offensive of September 1915 was planned on the basis of the experience in Artois in May and June. After the failure of the autumn breakthrough offensive, the French retained much of the material in Note 5779 to guide their operations at Verdun and on the Somme in 1916.) Castelnau believed that it was still possible to advance through the German defences in one attack and that Champagne was a likely region for such an attempt, if the mistakes made on 9 May could be avoided. Pétain agreed with Foch but doubted that another offensive could quickly be prepared in Artois and was sceptical that any part of the Western Front was free of villages like Souchez and Neuville, which could be fortified and against which, only attacks even more limited than those advocated by Foch were practical. On 8 July, Joffre decided to make the principal attack in Champagne, with a supporting attack in Artois a few days earlier to attract German reserves.

Joffre had accepted claims by Castelnau, that up to 6.2–7.5 mi (10–12 km) of ground could be gained in twenty-four hours and rejected a methodical battle, which

... would entail a month of combat, with a maximum expenditure of ammunition; at what point would we be able to declare ourselves ready for attack?

— Joseph Joffre

Ammunition necessary for a methodical battle did not exist and the opportunity to attack the Germans, when so many divisions had been moved to the eastern front, could not be wasted.

The offensive had been fought with unprecedented refinements of tactics and supply. Amendments to Note 5779 were suggested, to cover items like the use of 23,000 hand grenades in two days by the 53rd Division and the importance of attention to detail; Pétain of XXXIII Corps had ensured accurate preparatory bombardments and the tactical reflections he wrote were added to the thinking in Note 5779. The ideal characteristics of a network of jumping-off trenches and the time and labour necessary to build it were laid down, so that troops could advance simultaneously and reserve troops could be protected as they moved forward. Pétain wrote the plan for the Groupe d'armées du Centre, for the offensive of 25 September and his views were circulated through the French and British armies. The autumn offensive was fought as a breakthrough attempt, with changes to avoid the mistakes made in Artois in May and had significant tactical success but did not achieve a breakthrough, which led to the adoption of limited attacks in 1916.

Krause wrote that Note 5779 showed that the French command system was staffed by men who tried to improve the performance of the army and contradicts claims by Bruce Gudmundsson that the Allied armies were too centralised to adapt. Lessons had been collected, analysed and distributed in a manner which combined top-down and bottom-up processes. A flaw in Note 5779, was persistence with a concept of rapid breakthrough, even after many soldiers considered that the war had become a siege and that none of the French offensives of 1915, had been intended to return to mobile warfare. Changes made to the plan for the Second Battle of Artois, had been intended to secure the capture Vimy Ridge as a jumping-off point, rather than to achieve a breakthrough and return to mobile warfare.

In the autumn offensive which began on 25 September, with the Third Battle of Artois, Battle of Loos and the Second Battle of Champagne, the strategy was intended to make the Noyon salient untenable and regain a large portion of the occupied territories. Tactics used in the battles of May and June were revised and the creeping barrage became a standard method in all the Western Front armies. Improvements in French artillery tactics, were foreshadowed by the pauses in the creep of the 77th Division barrage on 9 May, which enabled the infantry to keep up and capture ouvrage 123, the fanning-out barrages and hybrid barrages fired on 16 June, the use of chemical shells and artillery observation from aircraft equipped with wireless.
