= I Royal Bavarian Reserve Corps =

I Royal Bavarian Reserve Corps I. Königlich Bayerisches Reserve-Korps
- Flag of the Staff of a Generalkommando (1871–1918)
- Active: 2 August 1914 - post November 1918
- Country: German Empire; Bavaria
- Branch: Bavarian Army
- Type: Corps
- Size: Approximately 38,000 (on formation)
- Engagements: World War I Battle of the Frontiers Battle of Vimy Ridge

Insignia
- Abbreviation: I Bavarian RK

The I Royal Bavarian Reserve Corps / I Bavarian RK (German: I. Königlich Bayerisches Reserve-Korps) was a corps level command of the Royal Bavarian Army, part of the Imperial German Army, in World War I. (Note: From the late 1800s, the Prussian Army was effectively the German Army as, during the period of German unification (1866-1871), the states of the German Empire entered into conventions with Prussia regarding their armies. Only the Bavarian Army remained fully autonomous and came under Prussian control only during wartime.)

== Formation ==
I Royal Bavarian Reserve Corps was formed on the outbreak of the war in August 1914 as part of the mobilisation of the Army. It was initially commanded by General der Infanterie Karl von Fasbender, brought out of retirement. It was still in existence at the end of the war in the 17th Army, Heeresgruppe Kronprinz Rupprecht on the Western Front.

=== Structure on formation ===
On formation in August 1914, I Royal Bavarian Reserve Corps consisted of two divisions, made up of reserve units. In general, Reserve Corps and Reserve Divisions were weaker than their active counterparts

Reserve Infantry Regiments did not always have three battalions nor necessarily contain a machine gun company
Reserve Jäger Battalions did not have a machine gun company on formation
Reserve Cavalry Regiments consisted of just three squadrons
Reserve Field Artillery Regiments usually consisted of two abteilungen of three batteries each
Corps Troops generally consisted of a Telephone Detachment and four sections of munition columns and trains

In summary, I Royal Bavarian Reserve Corps mobilised with 25 infantry battalions, 5 machine gun companies (30 machine guns), 6 cavalry squadrons, 12 field artillery batteries (72 guns) and 3 pioneer companies. 5th Bavarian Reserve Division was formed mostly by units drawn from the III Bavarian Corps District.

Corps	Division	Brigade	Units
I Royal Bavarian Reserve Corps	1st Bavarian Reserve Division	1st Bavarian Reserve Infantry Brigade	1st Bavarian Reserve Infantry Regiment
I Royal Bavarian Reserve Corps	1st Bavarian Reserve Division	1st Bavarian Reserve Infantry Brigade	2nd Bavarian Reserve Infantry Regiment
I Royal Bavarian Reserve Corps	1st Bavarian Reserve Division	2nd Bavarian Reserve Infantry Brigade	3rd Bavarian Reserve Infantry Regiment
I Royal Bavarian Reserve Corps	1st Bavarian Reserve Division	2nd Bavarian Reserve Infantry Brigade	12th Bavarian Reserve Infantry Regiment
I Royal Bavarian Reserve Corps	1st Bavarian Reserve Division		1st Bavarian Reserve Cavalry Regiment
I Royal Bavarian Reserve Corps	1st Bavarian Reserve Division		1st Bavarian Reserve Field Artillery Regiment
I Royal Bavarian Reserve Corps	1st Bavarian Reserve Division		1st Reserve Company, 1st Bavarian Pioneer Battalion
I Royal Bavarian Reserve Corps	1st Bavarian Reserve Division		1st Bavarian Reserve Divisional Pontoon Train
I Royal Bavarian Reserve Corps	1st Bavarian Reserve Division		1st Bavarian Reserve Medical Company
I Royal Bavarian Reserve Corps	5th Bavarian Reserve Division	9th Bavarian Reserve Infantry Brigade	6th Bavarian Reserve Infantry Regiment
I Royal Bavarian Reserve Corps	5th Bavarian Reserve Division	9th Bavarian Reserve Infantry Brigade	7th Bavarian Reserve Infantry Regiment
I Royal Bavarian Reserve Corps	5th Bavarian Reserve Division	11th Bavarian Reserve Infantry Brigade	10th Bavarian Reserve Infantry Regiment
I Royal Bavarian Reserve Corps	5th Bavarian Reserve Division	11th Bavarian Reserve Infantry Brigade	13th Bavarian Reserve Infantry Regiment
I Royal Bavarian Reserve Corps	5th Bavarian Reserve Division	11th Bavarian Reserve Infantry Brigade	1st Bavarian Reserve Jäger Battalion
I Royal Bavarian Reserve Corps	5th Bavarian Reserve Division		5th Bavarian Reserve Cavalry Regiment
I Royal Bavarian Reserve Corps	5th Bavarian Reserve Division		5th Bavarian Reserve Field Artillery Regiment
I Royal Bavarian Reserve Corps	5th Bavarian Reserve Division		4th Company, 2nd Bavarian Pioneer Battalion
I Royal Bavarian Reserve Corps	5th Bavarian Reserve Division		1st Reserve Company, 2nd Bavarian Pioneer Battalion
I Royal Bavarian Reserve Corps	5th Bavarian Reserve Division		5th Bavarian Reserve Divisional Pontoon Train
I Royal Bavarian Reserve Corps	5th Bavarian Reserve Division		5th Bavarian Reserve Medical Company
I Royal Bavarian Reserve Corps	Corps Troops		1st Bavarian Reserve Telephone Detachment
I Royal Bavarian Reserve Corps	Corps Troops		Munition Trains and Columns corresponding to the III Reserve Corps

== Combat chronicle ==
On mobilisation, I Royal Bavarian Reserve Corps was assigned to the predominantly Bavarian 6th Army forming part of the left wing of the forces for the Schlieffen Plan offensive in August 1914.

== Commanders ==
I Bavarian Reserve Corps had the following commanders during its existence:

From	Rank	Name
2 August 1914	General der Infanterie	Karl von Fasbender
8 November 1918	Generalleutnant	Paul von Kneußl

== See also ==
- Bavarian Army
- German Army order of battle (1914)
- German Army order of battle, Western Front (1918)

== Bibliography ==
- Cron, Hermann (2002). Imperial German Army 1914-18: Organisation, Structure, Orders-of-Battle [first published: 1937]. Helion & Co. ISBN 1-874622-70-1.
- Ellis, John; Cox, Michael (1993). The World War I Databook. Aurum Press Ltd. ISBN 1-85410-766-6.
- Histories of Two Hundred and Fifty-One Divisions of the German Army which Participated in the War (1914-1918), compiled from records of Intelligence section of the General Staff, American Expeditionary Forces, at General Headquarters, Chaumont, France 1919. The London Stamp Exchange Ltd. 1989 [1920]. ISBN 0-948130-87-3.
- The German Forces in the Field; 7th Revision, 11th November 1918; Compiled by the General Staff, War Office. Imperial War Museum, London and the Battery Press. 1995 [1918]. ISBN 978-1-870423-95-3.
