= Karl von Fasbender =

Bavarian infantry general

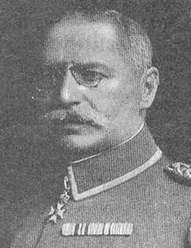
- Born: 3 December 1852; Michelbach, Wiesbaden
- Died: 13 May 1933 (aged 80); Munich, Germany
- Military career
- Allegiance: Kingdom of Bavaria; German Empire
- Service years: 1872–1918
- Rank: General der Infanterie
- Commands: 1st Bavarian Jäger Battalion "King"; 3rd Royal Bavarian Infantry "Prince Charles of Bavaria"; 9th Bavarian Infantry Brigade; 4th Royal Bavarian Division; I Royal Bavarian Reserve Corps; 19th Army
- Conflicts: World War I Battle of the Frontiers Battle of Vimy Ridge
- Awards: Military Order of Max Joseph, Grand Cross; Pour le Mérite

Karl Ritter von Fasbender (3 December 1852 – 13 May 1933) was a Bavarian General der Infanterie who served as a corps commander throughout World War I and briefly commanded an army at the end of the war.

== Military service ==
Although he was a native of the Prussian Province of Hesse-Nassau, Fasbender joined the Bavarian Army in 1872. He rose to divisional command in the pre-War period, before retiring in 1912. He also served as Chief of Bavarian General Staff in 1907 and 1908.

Recalled from retirement on the outbreak of the War, he took command of the newly formed I Royal Bavarian Reserve Corps as part of the mostly Bavarian 6th Army. He commanded this Corps for almost the entire duration of the war. In the final days of the war, he was appointed to command the 19th Army.

On September 3, 1914 in Hénamenil (France), he signed a letter which demanded that the civilian population of Lunéville (France) pay a ransom of 650,000 francs, including 50,000 in gold pieces. The motivation was for acts of war supposedly committed by French civilians. The French later accused him of having these acts committed by his subordinates as a pretext for the ransom.

Fasbender was awarded the Pour le Mérite (the Kingdom of Prussia's highest order of merit) on 13 September 1916. He was also successively awarded all three classes of the Military Order of Max Joseph (German: Militär-Max-Joseph-Orden), the highest purely military order of the Kingdom of Bavaria: Knight's Cross (German: Ritterkreuz) on 5 October 1914, Commander's Cross (German: Kommandeurkreuz) on 4 January 1917 and Grand Cross (German: Großkreuz) on 23 April 1917.

Karl von Fasbender died on 13 May 1933 in Munich, Germany.

== See also ==
- Bavarian Army

== Bibliography ==
- Cron, Hermann (2002). Imperial German Army 1914-18: Organisation, Structure, Orders-of-Battle [first published: 1937]. Helion & Co. ISBN 1-874622-70-1.

Military offices
Preceded by New Formation	Commander, I Royal Bavarian Reserve Corps; 2 August 1914 - 8 November 1918	Succeeded by Generalleutnant Paul von Kneußl
Preceded by Generaloberst Felix Graf von Bothmer	Commander, 19th Army; 8 November 1918 - 18 December 1918	Succeeded by Dissolved
