= 1st Bavarian Reserve Division =

1st Bavarian Reserve Division (1. Bayerische Reserve-Division)
- Active: 1914-1919
- Country: Bavaria/Germany
- Branch: Army
- Type: Infantry
- Size: Approx. 15,000
- Engagements: World War I: Battle of the Frontiers, Race to the Sea, Arras (1914), Somme (1916), Arras (1917), Passchendaele, Battle of the Lys

The 1st Bavarian Reserve Division (1. Bayerische Reserve-Division) was a unit of the Royal Bavarian Army, part of the German Army, in World War I. The division was formed on mobilization of the German Army in August 1914 as part of I Royal Bavarian Reserve Corps. The division was disbanded in 1919 during the demobilization of the German Army after World War I. The division was raised and recruited in Bavaria. As a reserve division, it included many recalled reservists and war volunteers.

== Combat chronicle ==
The 1st Bavarian Reserve Division fought in the opening phases of the war in the Battle of the Frontiers. It then participated in the Race to the Sea, including the Battle of Arras in October 1914. It remained in the trenchlines in Flanders until 1916, when it entered the Battle of the Somme in August 1916. In April 1917 the division, now redeployed to the Vimy sector, participated in the Battle of Vimy Ridge. In late 1917, it participated in the Battle of Passchendaele. In 1918, the division fought in the Battle of the Lys. The division ended the war still fighting in the Lys region. Allied intelligence rated the division as a good division in 1917, but third class in 1918.

== Order of battle on mobilization ==
The order of battle of the 1st Bavarian Reserve Division on mobilization was as follows:

- 1. bayerische Reserve-Infanterie-Brigade
  - Kgl. Bayerisches Reserve-Infanterie-Regiment Nr. 1
  - Kgl. Bayerisches Reserve-Infanterie-Regiment Nr. 2
- 2. bayerische Reserve-Infanterie-Brigade
  - Kgl. Bayerisches Reserve-Infanterie-Regiment Nr. 3
  - Kgl. Bayerisches Reserve-Infanterie-Regiment Nr. 12
- Kgl. Bayerisches Reserve-Kavallerie-Regiment Nr. 1
- Kgl. Bayerisches Reserve-Feldartillerie-Regiment Nr. 1
- 1. Reserve-Kompanie/Kgl. Bayerisches 1. Pionier-Bataillon

== Order of battle on March 1, 1918 ==
Divisions underwent many changes during the war, with regiments moving from division to division, and some being destroyed and rebuilt. The 1st Bavarian Reserve Division was triangularized in April 1915, losing the 2nd Bavarian Reserve Infantry Brigade headquarters and the 12th Bavarian Reserve Infantry Regiment. Over the course of the war, other units were exchanged with other divisions, cavalry was reduced, engineers increased, and an artillery command and a divisional signals command were created. The 1st Bavarian Reserve Division's order of battle on March 1, 1918, was as follows:

- 1. bayerische Reserve-Infanterie-Brigade
  - Kgl. Bayerisches Reserve-Infanterie-Regiment Nr. 1
  - Kgl. Bayerisches Reserve-Infanterie-Regiment Nr. 2
  - Kgl. Bayerisches Reserve-Infanterie-Regiment Nr. 3
- 3.Eskadron/Kgl. Bayerisches 3. Chevaulegers-Regiment Herzog Karl Theodor
- Kgl. Bayerischer Artillerie-Kommandeur 13
  - Kgl. Bayerisches Reserve-Feldartillerie-Regiment Nr. 1
  - II./Kgl. Bayerisches Reserve-Fußartillerie-Regiment Nr. 2 (from July 7, 1918)
- Stab Kgl. Bayerisches Pionier-Bataillon Nr. 17
  - Kgl. Bayerische Reserve-Pionier-Kompanie Nr. 1
  - Kgl. Bayerische Reserve-Pionier-Kompanie Nr. 17
  - Kgl. Bayerische Minenwerfer-Kompanie Nr. 201
- Kgl. Bayerischer Divisions-Nachrichten-Kommandeur 401
