= 5th Bavarian Reserve Division =

5th Bavarian Reserve Division (5. Bayerische Reserve-Division)
- Active: 1914-1919
- Country: Bavaria/Germany
- Branch: Army
- Type: Infantry
- Size: Approx. 15,000
- Engagements: World War I: Battle of the Frontiers, Race to the Sea, Arras (1914), Somme (1916), Arras (1917), 2nd Aisne, Passchendaele, Meuse-Argonne Offensive

The 5th Bavarian Reserve Division (5. Bayerische Reserve-Division) was a unit of the Royal Bavarian Army, part of the German Army, in World War I. The division was formed on mobilization of the German Army in August 1914 as part of I Royal Bavarian Reserve Corps. The division was disbanded in 1919 during the demobilization of the German Army after World War I. The division was raised and recruited in Bavaria, mainly in Upper Bavaria and Upper and Middle Franconia. As a reserve division, it included many recalled reservists.

== Combat chronicle ==
The 5th Bavarian Reserve Division fought in the opening phases of the war in the Battle of the Frontiers. It then participated in the Race to the Sea, including the Battle of Arras in October 1914. It remained in the trenchlines in Flanders until 1916, when it entered the Battle of the Somme in August 1916. It remained in the Somme and Aisne area until January 1917, when it went into 1st Army reserve to rest and refit. After returning to the line, it saw action in the Second Battle of the Aisne, also called the Third Battle of Champagne (and by the Germans, the Double Battle on the Aisne and in the Champagne). Later in 1917, it participated in the Battle of Passchendaele. In 1918, the division fought in the German spring offensive. The division ended the war fighting against the American Meuse-Argonne Offensive. Allied intelligence rated the division as a good second class division.

== Order of battle on mobilization ==
The order of battle of the 5th Bavarian Reserve Division on mobilization was as follows:

- 9. bayerische Reserve-Infanterie-Brigade
  - Kgl. Bayerisches Reserve-Infanterie-Regiment Nr. 6
  - Kgl. Bayerisches Reserve-Infanterie-Regiment Nr. 7
- 11. bayerische Reserve-Infanterie-Brigade
  - Kgl. Bayerisches Reserve-Infanterie-Regiment Nr. 10
  - Kgl. Bayerisches Reserve-Infanterie-Regiment Nr. 13
  - Kgl. Bayerisches Reserve-Jäger-Bataillon Nr. 1
- Reserve-Kavallerie-Regiment Nr. 5
- Kgl. Bayerisches Reserve-Feldartillerie-Regiment Nr. 5
- 4. Kompanie/Kgl. Bayerisches 2. Pionier-Bataillon
- 1. Reserve-Kompanie/Kgl. Bayerisches 2. Pionier-Bataillon

== Order of battle on April 4, 1918 ==
Divisions underwent many changes during the war, with regiments moving from division to division, and some being destroyed and rebuilt. The 5th Bavarian Reserve Division was triangularized in April 1915, losing the 9th Bavarian Reserve Infantry Brigade headquarters and the 6th Bavarian Reserve Infantry Regiment. Over the course of the war, other units were exchanged with other divisions, cavalry was reduced, engineers increased, and an artillery command and a divisional signals command were created. The 5th Bavarian Reserve Division's order of battle on April 4, 1918, was as follows:

- 11. bayerische Reserve-Infanterie-Brigade
  - Kgl. Bayerisches Reserve-Infanterie-Regiment Nr. 7
  - Kgl. Bayerisches Reserve-Infanterie-Regiment Nr. 10
  - Kgl. Bayerisches Reserve-Infanterie-Regiment Nr. 12
- 2.Eskadron/Kgl. Bayerisches 3. Chevaulegers-Regiment Herzog Karl Theodor
- Kgl. Bayerischer Artillerie-Kommandeur 17
  - Kgl. Bayerisches Reserve-Feldartillerie-Regiment Nr. 5
  - II.Bataillon/Kgl. Sächs. Reserve-Fußartillerie-Regiment Nr. 19 (to July 25, 1918)
  - Kgl. Bayerisches Fußartillerie-Bataillon Nr. 17 (from August 19, 1918)
- Stab Kgl. Bayerisches Pionier-Bataillon Nr. 18
  - Kgl. Bayerische Reserve-Pionier-Kompanie Nr. 2
  - Kgl. Bayerische Reserve-Pionier-Kompanie Nr. 19
  - Kgl. Bayerische Minenwerfer-Kompanie Nr. 205
- Kgl. Bayerischer Divisions-Nachrichten-Kommandeur 405
