= Antoine de Mitry =

French general (1857–1924)

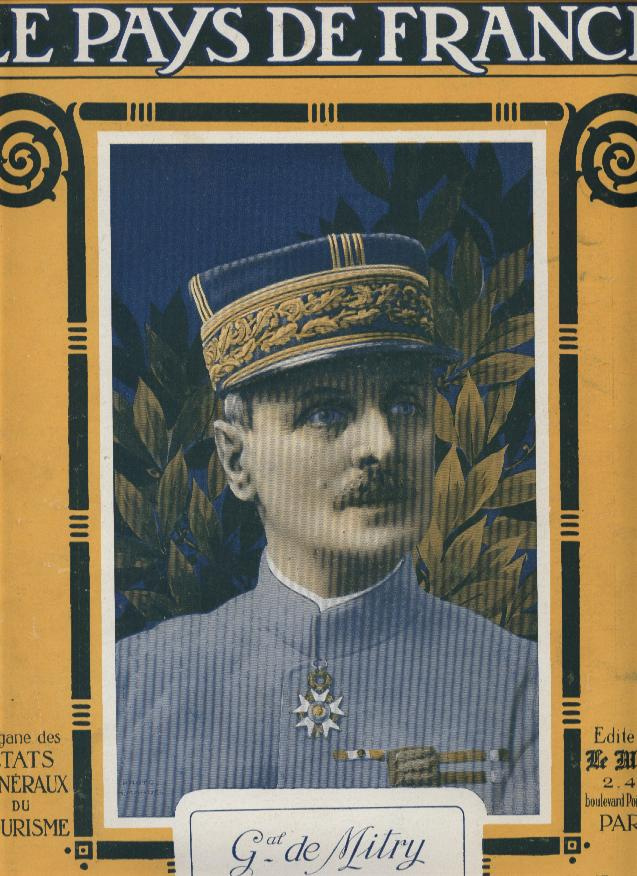
Antoine de Mitry on the cover of Le Pays de France.

Antoine Henri de Mitry (Leménil-Mitry, 20 September 1857 – 18 August 1924) was a French army general during World War I.

He entered the Ecole Spéciale Militaire de Saint-Cyr in 1875, and afterwards joined the cavalry. A colonel in 1910, he commanded a brigade of cuirassiers at the outbreak of World War I.

On 30 August 1914 he received command of the 2nd Cavalry Corps, with which he fought in the Battle of Arras (1914) and the First Battle of Ypres. On 15 February 1915, he became a division general.

In April 1917, he participated at the head of the 6th Army Corps in the Second Battle of the Aisne. From 6 July 1918 until 7 August 1918, he commanded the 9th Army; and from 23 October until the end of the war, the 7th Army.

General de Mitry was a commandeur of the Légion d'honneur.

He died in 1924 and was buried in the Hôtel des Invalides.
