= Mitry =

Mitry is the name or part of the name of two communes of France:

- Mitry-Mory in the Seine-et-Marne département
- Leménil-Mitry in the Meurthe-et-Moselle département
