= Windmill British Cemetery =

Cemetery in Pas-de-Calais, France

- Commonwealth War Graves Commission
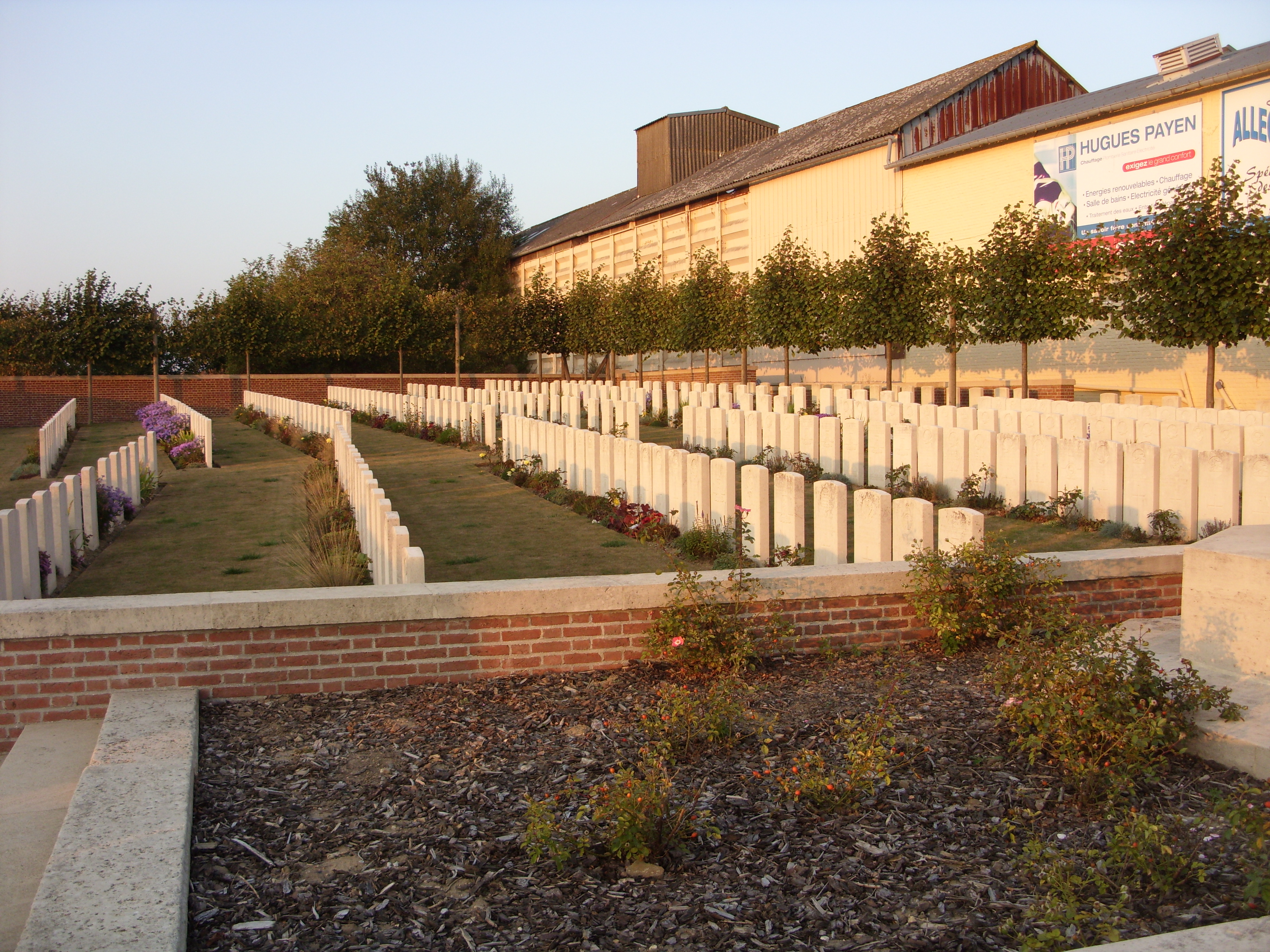
- Used for those deceased 1917–1918
- Established: 1917
- Location: 50°15′46″N 2°53′2″E near Monchy-le-Preux, France
- Designed by: Sir Edwin Lutyens
- Total burials: 402
- Unknowns: 35

Burials by nation
- Allied Powers: United Kingdom: 336; Canada: 65; South Africa: 1; Central Powers: Germany: 1

Burials by war
- World War I: 368

The Windmill British Cemetery is a Commonwealth War Graves Commission (CWGC) burial ground for the dead of World War I located near to the commune of Monchy-le-Preux on the main Arras to Cambrai road (D339) in the département of Pas-de-Calais, France.

The cemetery contains the graves of 368 known casualties and 35 unidentified.

== History ==
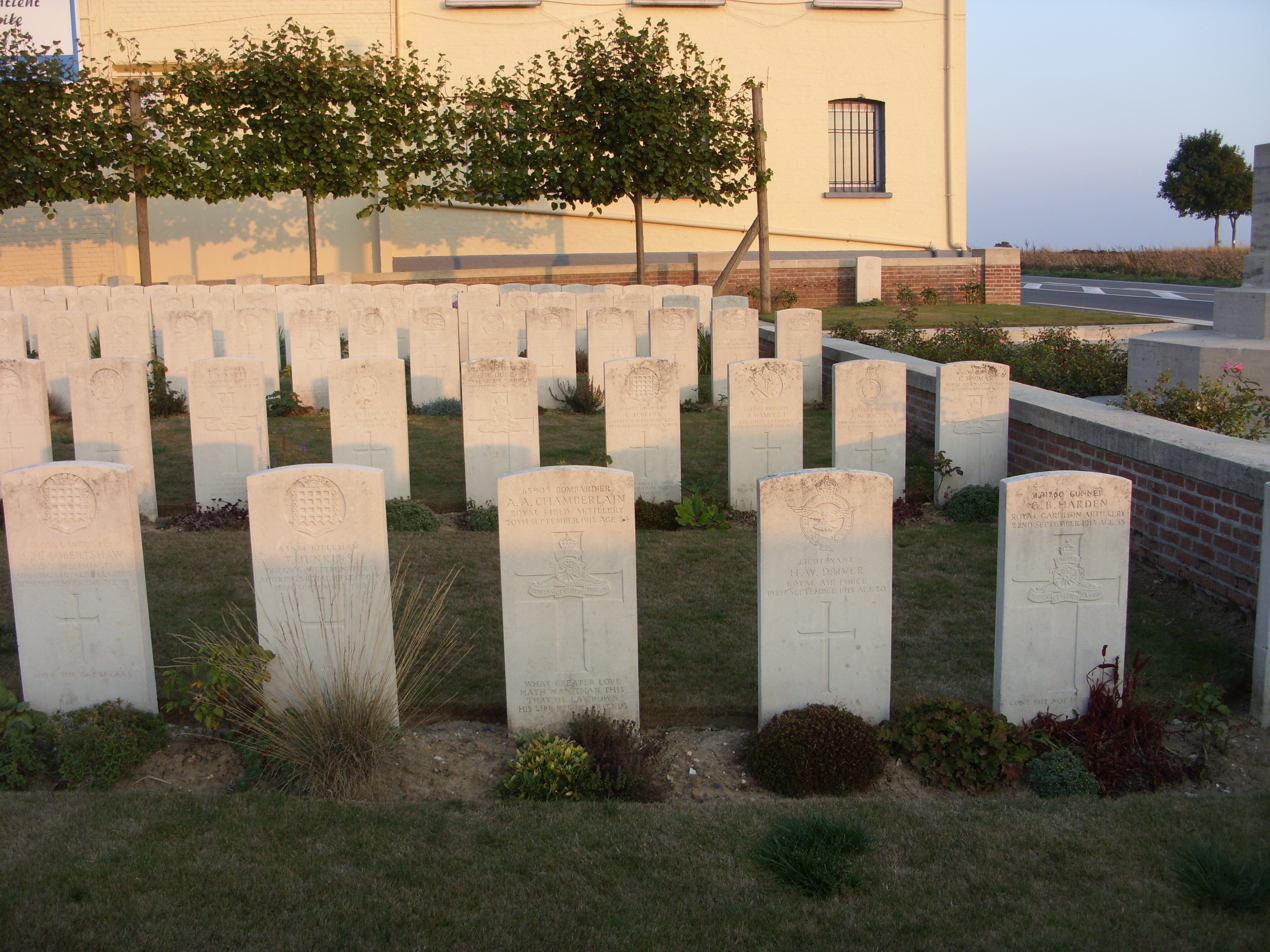

The cemetery was first used in May 1917 by the 29th Division to bury the dead from the Second Battle of the Scarpe of the 23 April 1917. The cemetery continued to be used until March 1918 and then again between August and October 1918.
