= Canton of Arras-2 =

Canton of France

Coordinates: 50.29°N 2.78°E

The canton of Arras-2 is an administrative division of the Pas-de-Calais department, in northern France. It was created at the French canton reorganisation which came into effect in March 2015. Its seat is in Arras.

It consists of the following communes:

1. Arras (partly)
2. Athies
3. Bailleul-Sir-Berthoult
4. Fampoux
5. Farbus
6. Feuchy
7. Gavrelle
8. Monchy-le-Preux
9. Saint-Laurent-Blangy
10. Saint-Nicolas
11. Thélus
12. Willerval
