= Feuchy =

- Commune
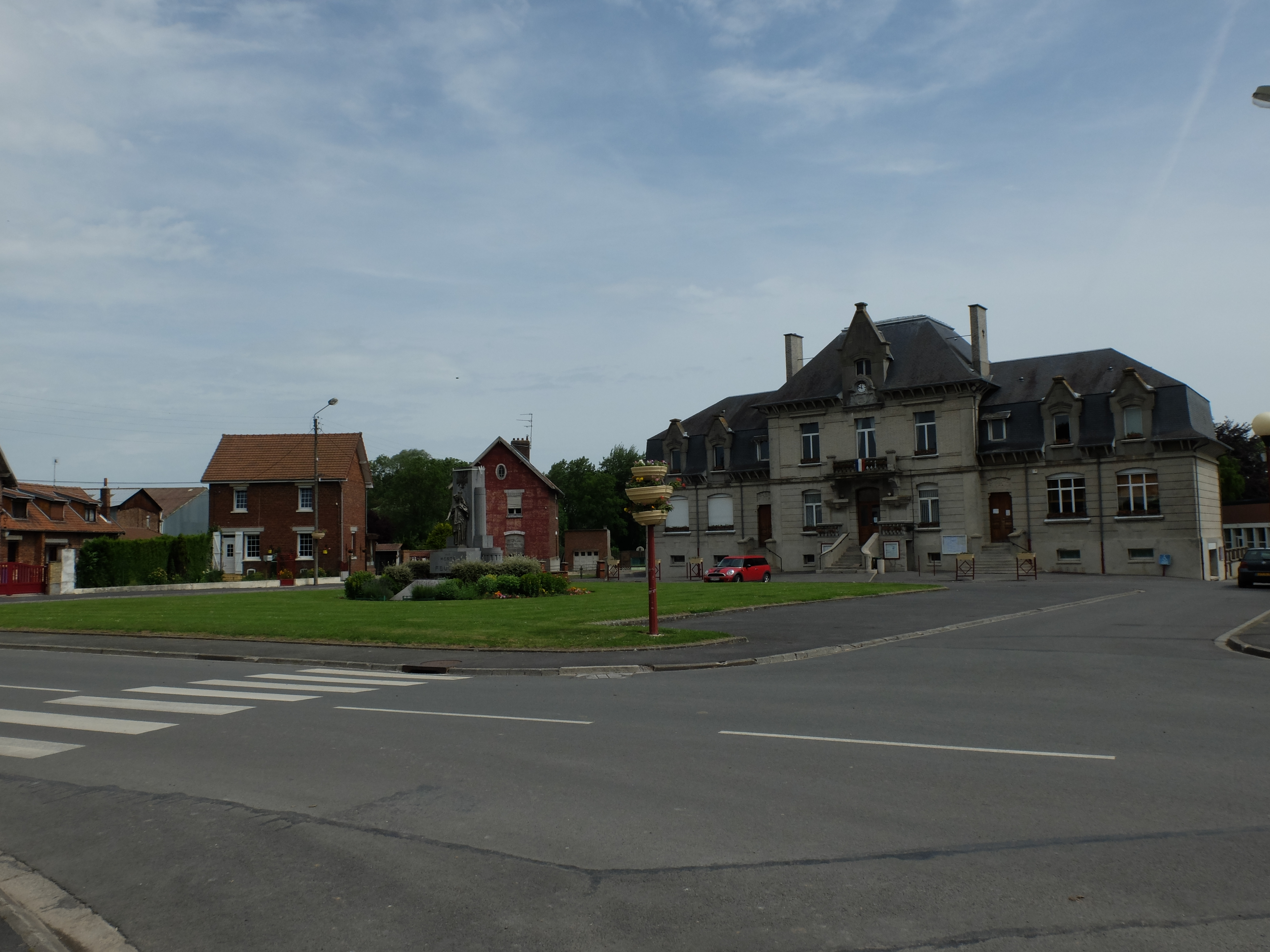
- The town hall of Feuchy

- Coat of arms
- Location of Feuchy
- Location within France Location within Hauts-de-France
- Coordinates: 50°17′38″N 2°50′48″E
- Country: France
- Region: Hauts-de-France
- Department: Pas-de-Calais
- Arrondissement: Arras
- Canton: Arras-2
- Intercommunality: CU d'Arras

Government
  - Mayor (2020–2026): Roger Potez
- Area^{1}: 5.45 km^{2} (2.10 sq mi)
- Elevation: 65 m (213 ft)
- Highest elevation: 102 m (335 ft)
- Lowest elevation: 46 m (151 ft)
- Population (2023): 991
  - Density: 182/km^{2} (471/sq mi)
- Time zone: UTC+01:00 (CET)
  - Summer (DST): UTC+02:00 (CEST)
- INSEE/Postal code: 62331 /62223
- ^{1} French Land Register data, which excludes lakes, ponds, glaciers > 1 km^{2} (0.386 sq mi or 247 acres) and river estuaries.

Feuchy (French pronunciation: [føʃi]) is a commune in the Pas-de-Calais department in the Hauts-de-France region of France. It is a small village, with a little more than 1000 inhabitants, and had only about 500 inhabitants in 1914. It is situated two kilometers east of Arras. During World War I, in 1914, it was occupied by German troops. British troops took over the Arras sector in March 1916. On April 9, 1917, the British operation "big push" led to advancement of several miles to the east in a battle with one with the most casualties per day, and Feuchy was liberated. The German offensives placed Feuchy under their control in 1918 until the Canadians cleared the area in August 1918. The population of Feuchy was evacuated and the village was completely destroyed.

== Geography ==
A farming and light industrial village situated 3 miles (4.8 km) east of Arras, at the junction of the D37 and D258 roads, in the valley of the Scarpe river. Feuchy knows an important development thanks to this road infrastructure.

== Population ==
Historical population
Year	Pop.	±% p.a.
1968	915	—
1975	1,299	+5.13%
1982	1,256	−0.48%
1990	1,198	−0.59%
1999	1,165	−0.31%
2007	1,062	−1.15%
2012	1,062	+0.00%
2017	1,028	−0.65%
2023	991	−0.61%
Source: INSEE

Its inhabitants are called Feuchyssois in French. Feuchy has two schools.

== Places of interest ==
- The church of St. Vaast, rebuilt along with most of the commune, after World War I.
- The Commonwealth War Graves Commission cemetery.

== See also ==
- Communes of the Pas-de-Calais department
