= Monchy British Cemetery =

Coordinates: 50.2727°N 2.8751°E

- Commonwealth War Graves Commission
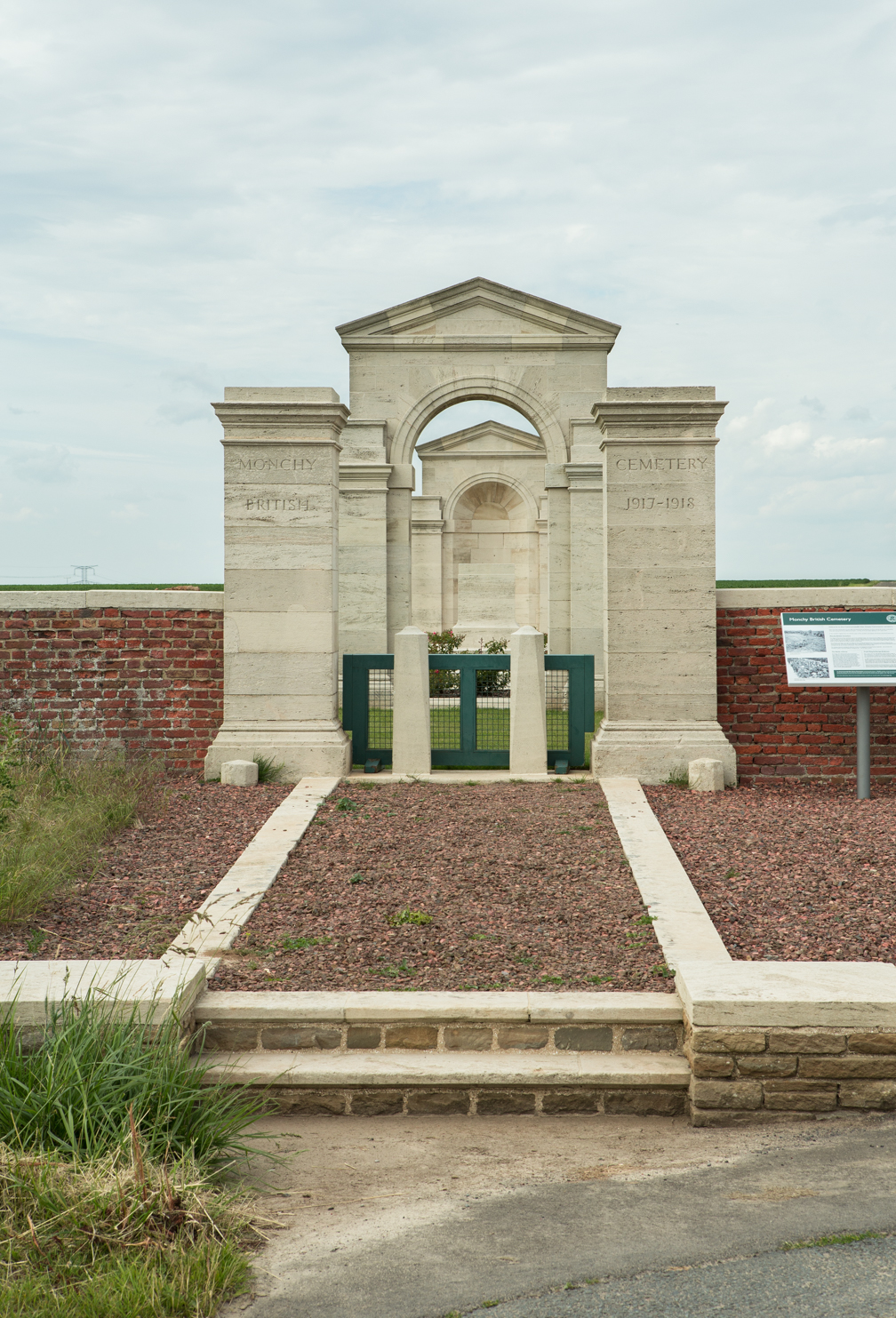
- Monchy British Cemetery
- For First World War
- Established: April 1917
- Location: Monchy-le-Preux, Pas-de-Calais, France
- Designed by: Sir Edwin Lutyens
- Total burials: 581
- Unknowns: 58

Burials by nation
- * United Kingdom: 500: Canada: 23

Monchy British Cemetery is a Commonwealth War Graves Commission military cemetery containing Commonwealth burials from the First World War, located in the French department of Pas-de-Calais.

The cemetery is located 1.24 miles (2.00 km) west of Monchy-le-Preux and 5 miles (8.0 km) east of Arras.

== History ==
Monchy-le-Preux holds a commanding position of the surrounding countryside and was captured during the initial German offensives of 1914. The village was retaken by British forces on 11 April 1917, who immediately established the cemetery.

The village and cemetery were later occupied by the Germans after the 1918 Spring Offensive but retaken by the Canadians in August.

The burials within the cemetery reflect the fact that both British and Canadian soldiers fought to capture and defend the village throughout 1917 and 1918.
