= Gavrelle =

- Commune
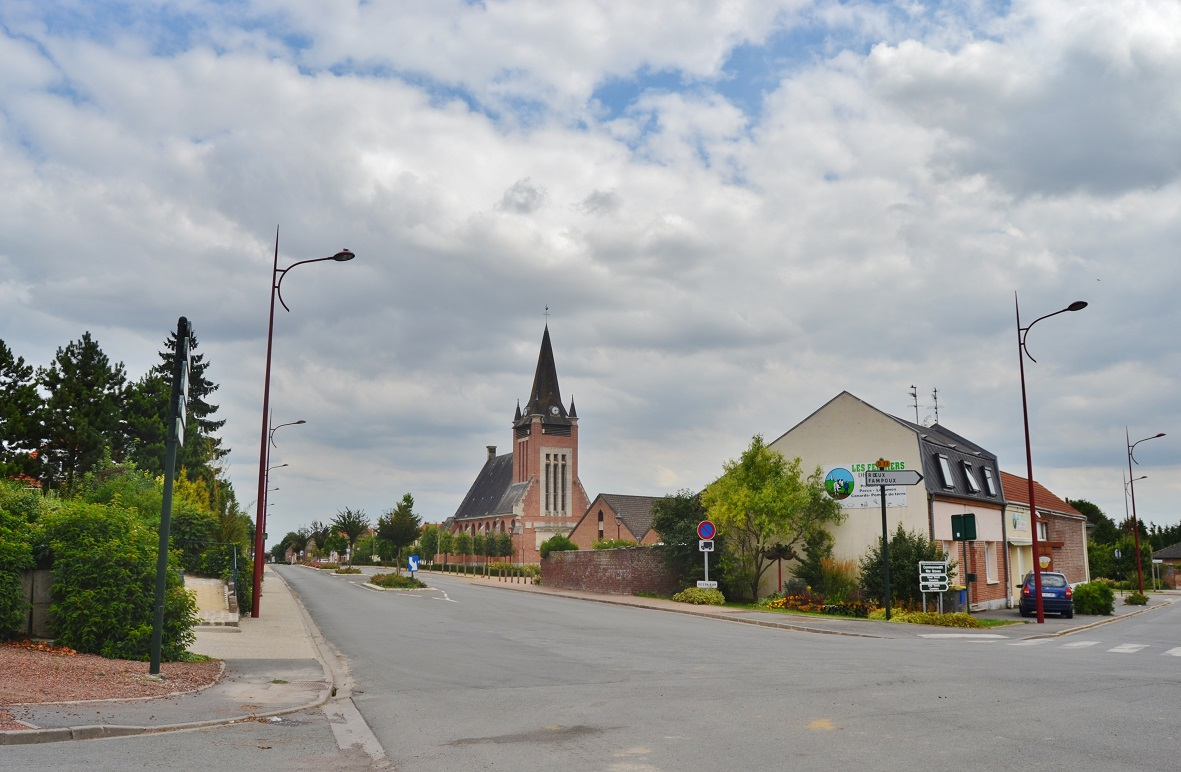
- The church of Gavrelle

- Coat of arms
- Location of Gavrelle
- Location within France Location within Hauts-de-France
- Coordinates: 50°19′48″N 2°53′13″E
- Country: France
- Region: Hauts-de-France
- Department: Pas-de-Calais
- Arrondissement: Arras
- Canton: Arras-2
- Intercommunality: CU d'Arras

Government
  - Mayor (2020–2026): Vincent Théry
- Area^{1}: 9.02 km^{2} (3.48 sq mi)
- Elevation: 61 m (200 ft)
- Highest elevation: 97 m (318 ft)
- Lowest elevation: 49 m (161 ft)
- Population (2023): 768
  - Density: 85.1/km^{2} (221/sq mi)
- Time zone: UTC+01:00 (CET)
  - Summer (DST): UTC+02:00 (CEST)
- INSEE/Postal code: 62369 /62580
- ^{1} French Land Register data, which excludes lakes, ponds, glaciers > 1 km^{2} (0.386 sq mi or 247 acres) and river estuaries.

Gavrelle (French pronunciation: [ɡavʁɛl]) is a commune in the Pas-de-Calais department in the Hauts-de-France region of France 6 miles (9.7 km) northeast of Arras.

== Population ==
Historical population
Year	Pop.	±% p.a.
1968	390	—
1975	394	+0.15%
1982	358	−1.36%
1990	430	+2.32%
1999	475	+1.11%
2007	566	+2.22%
2012	588	+0.77%
2017	627	+1.29%
2023	768	+3.44%
Source: INSEE

== See also ==
- Communes of the Pas-de-Calais department
