= Saint-Laurent-Blangy =

- Commune
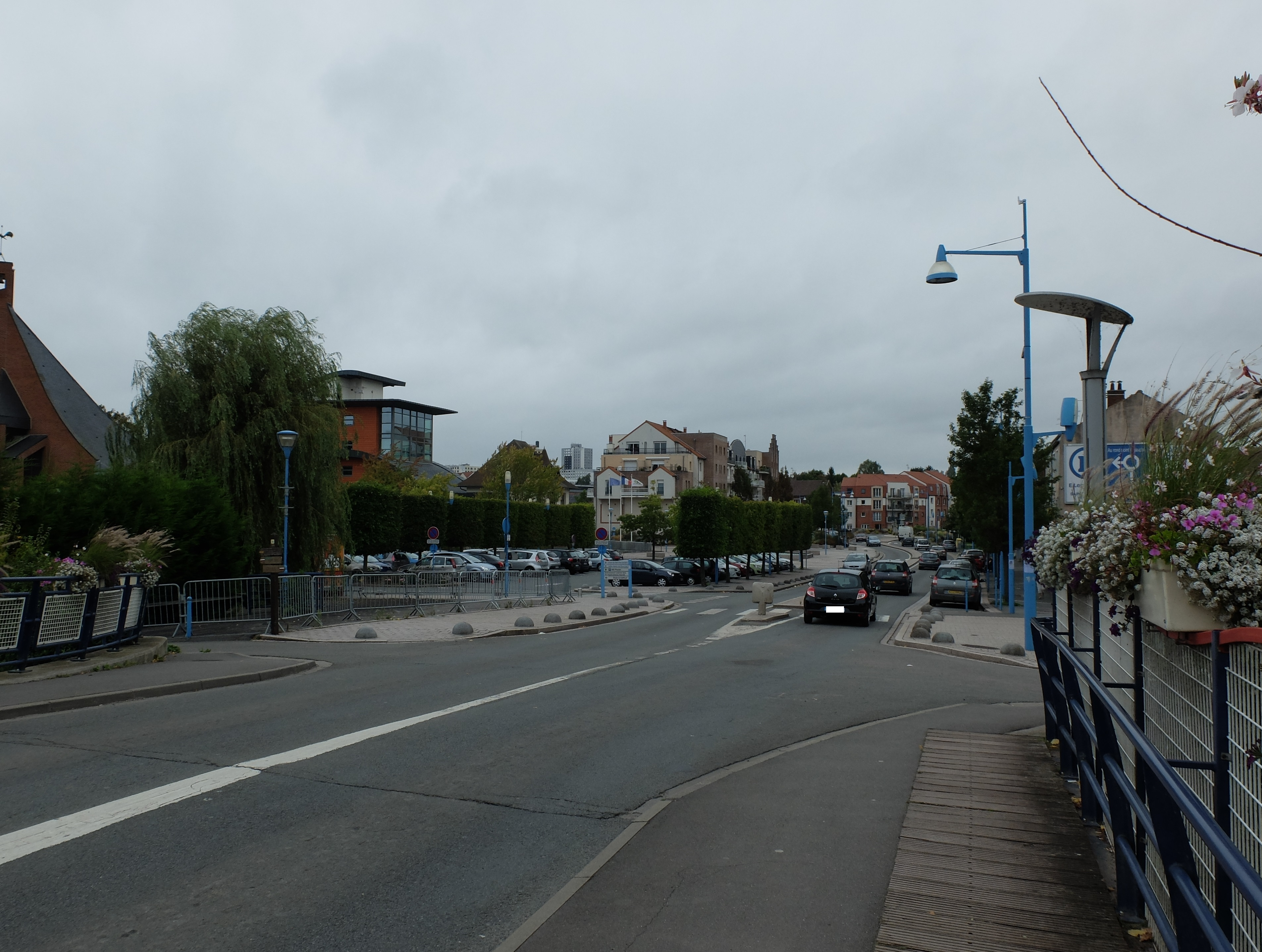
- A road within Saint-Laurent-Blangy

- Coat of arms
- Location of Saint-Laurent-Blangy
- Location within France Location within Hauts-de-France
- Coordinates: 50°18′11″N 2°48′13″E
- Country: France
- Region: Hauts-de-France
- Department: Pas-de-Calais
- Arrondissement: Arras
- Canton: Arras-2
- Intercommunality: CU d'Arras

Government
  - Mayor (2020–2026): Nicolas Desfachelle
- Area^{1}: 9.83 km^{2} (3.80 sq mi)
- Elevation: 93 m (305 ft)
- Highest elevation: 103 m (338 ft)
- Lowest elevation: 50 m (160 ft)
- Population (2023): 6,459
  - Density: 657/km^{2} (1,700/sq mi)
- Time zone: UTC+01:00 (CET)
  - Summer (DST): UTC+02:00 (CEST)
- INSEE/Postal code: 62753 /62223
- ^{1} French Land Register data, which excludes lakes, ponds, glaciers > 1 km^{2} (0.386 sq mi or 247 acres) and river estuaries.

Saint-Laurent-Blangy (French pronunciation: [sɛ̃ loʁɑ̃ blɑ̃ʒi]) is a commune in the Pas-de-Calais department in the Hauts-de-France region of France northeast of Arras.

== History ==
The town was completely destroyed during the First World War.

== Population ==
Historical population
Year	Pop.	±% p.a.
1968	3,752	—
1975	5,227	+4.85%
1982	6,100	+2.23%
1990	5,358	−1.61%
1999	5,578	+0.45%
2007	5,531	−0.11%
2012	6,450	+3.12%
2017	6,606	+0.48%
2023	6,459	−0.37%
Source: INSEE

== See also ==
Communes of the Pas-de-Calais department
