= Monchy-le-Preux =

- Commune
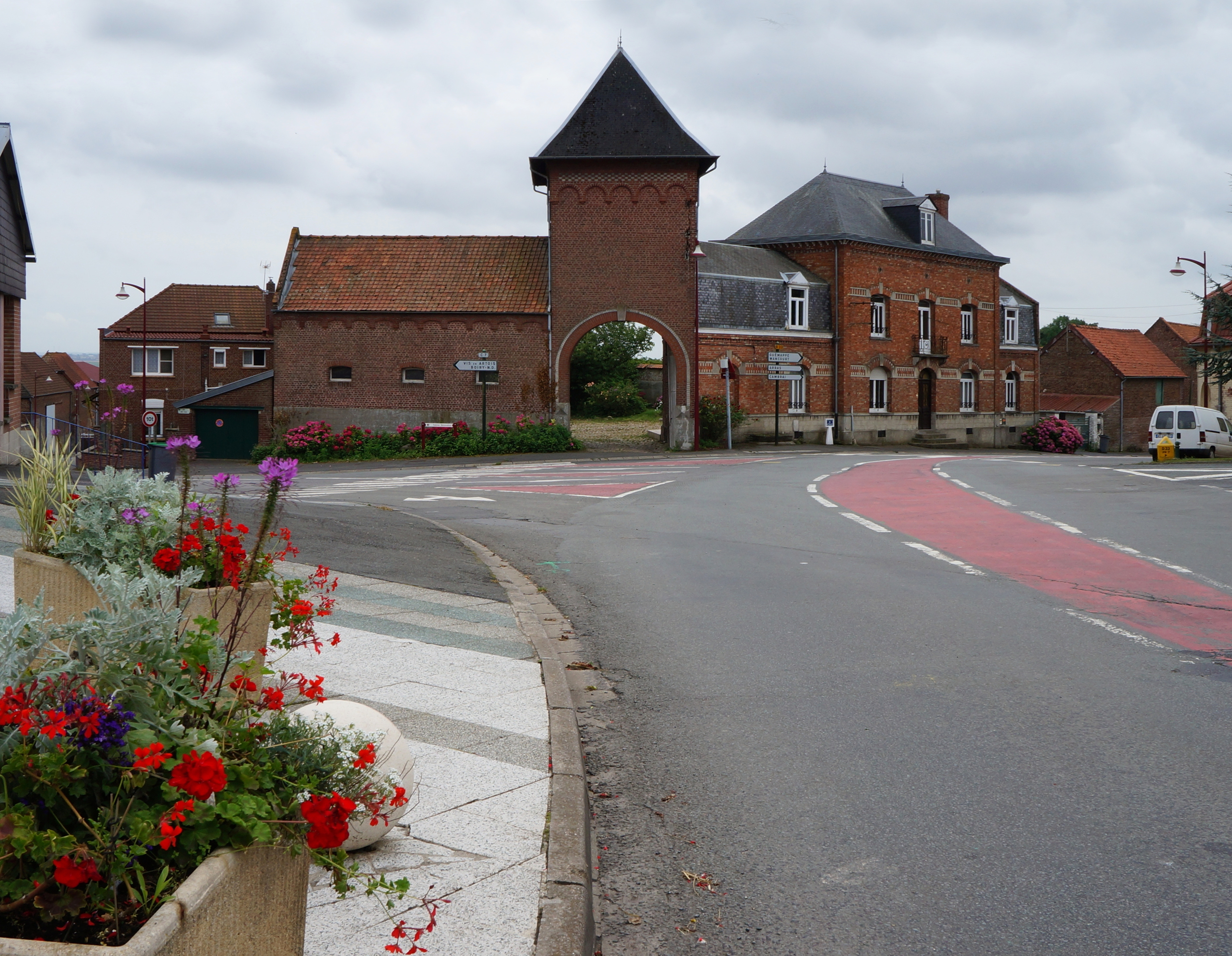
- The townhall

- Coat of arms
- Location of Monchy-le-Preux
- Location within France Location within Hauts-de-France
- Coordinates: 50°16′14″N 2°53′39″E
- Country: France
- Region: Hauts-de-France
- Department: Pas-de-Calais
- Arrondissement: Arras
- Canton: Arras-2
- Intercommunality: CU d'Arras

Government
  - Mayor (2020–2026): Olivier Degauquier
- Area^{1}: 9.26 km^{2} (3.58 sq mi)
- Elevation: 107 m (351 ft)
- Highest elevation: 113 m (371 ft)
- Lowest elevation: 52 m (171 ft)
- Population (2023): 679
  - Density: 73.3/km^{2} (190/sq mi)
- Time zone: UTC+01:00 (CET)
  - Summer (DST): UTC+02:00 (CEST)
- INSEE/Postal code: 62582 /62118
- ^{1} French Land Register data, which excludes lakes, ponds, glaciers > 1 km^{2} (0.386 sq mi or 247 acres) and river estuaries.

Monchy-le-Preux (French pronunciation: [mɔ̃ʃi lə pʁø]) is a commune in the Pas-de-Calais department in the Hauts-de-France region of France ten kilometres (six miles) southeast of Arras.

== History ==
During the First World War, ten Commonwealth soldiers, from Newfoundland territory while still independent from Canada fought off a German counterattack in April 1917 and kept the village from German occupation.

== Population ==
Historical population
Year	Pop.	±% p.a.
1968	465	—
1975	423	−1.34%
1982	455	+1.05%
1990	487	+0.85%
1999	521	+0.75%
2007	571	+1.15%
2012	676	+3.43%
2017	651	−0.75%
2023	679	+0.70%
Source: INSEE

== Places of interest ==
- Monchy-le-Preux (Newfoundland) Memorial commemorating soldiers of the Newfoundland Regiment in World War I.
- Windmill British Cemetery
- Monchy British Cemetery
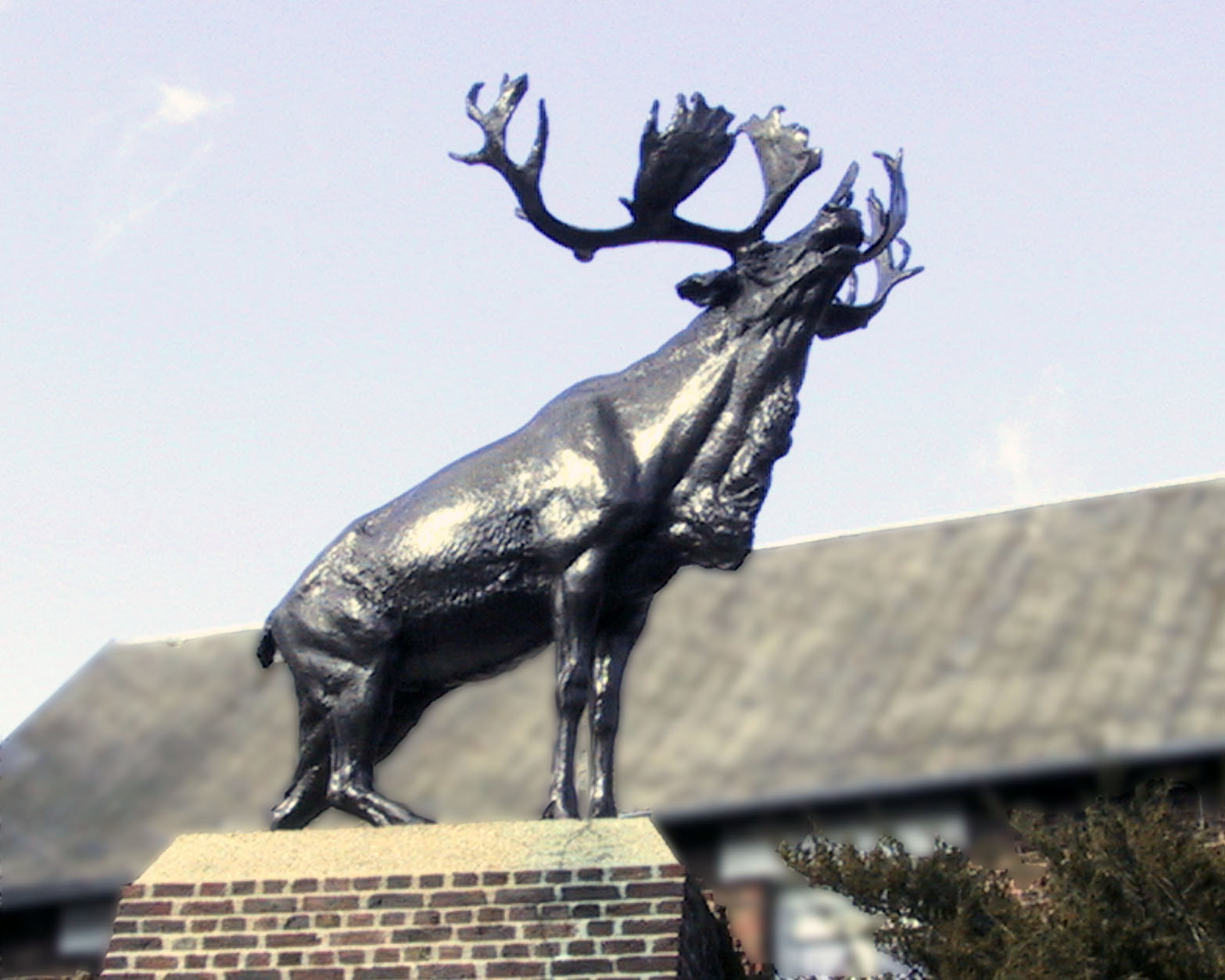
The caribou monument to the Newfoundland Regiment

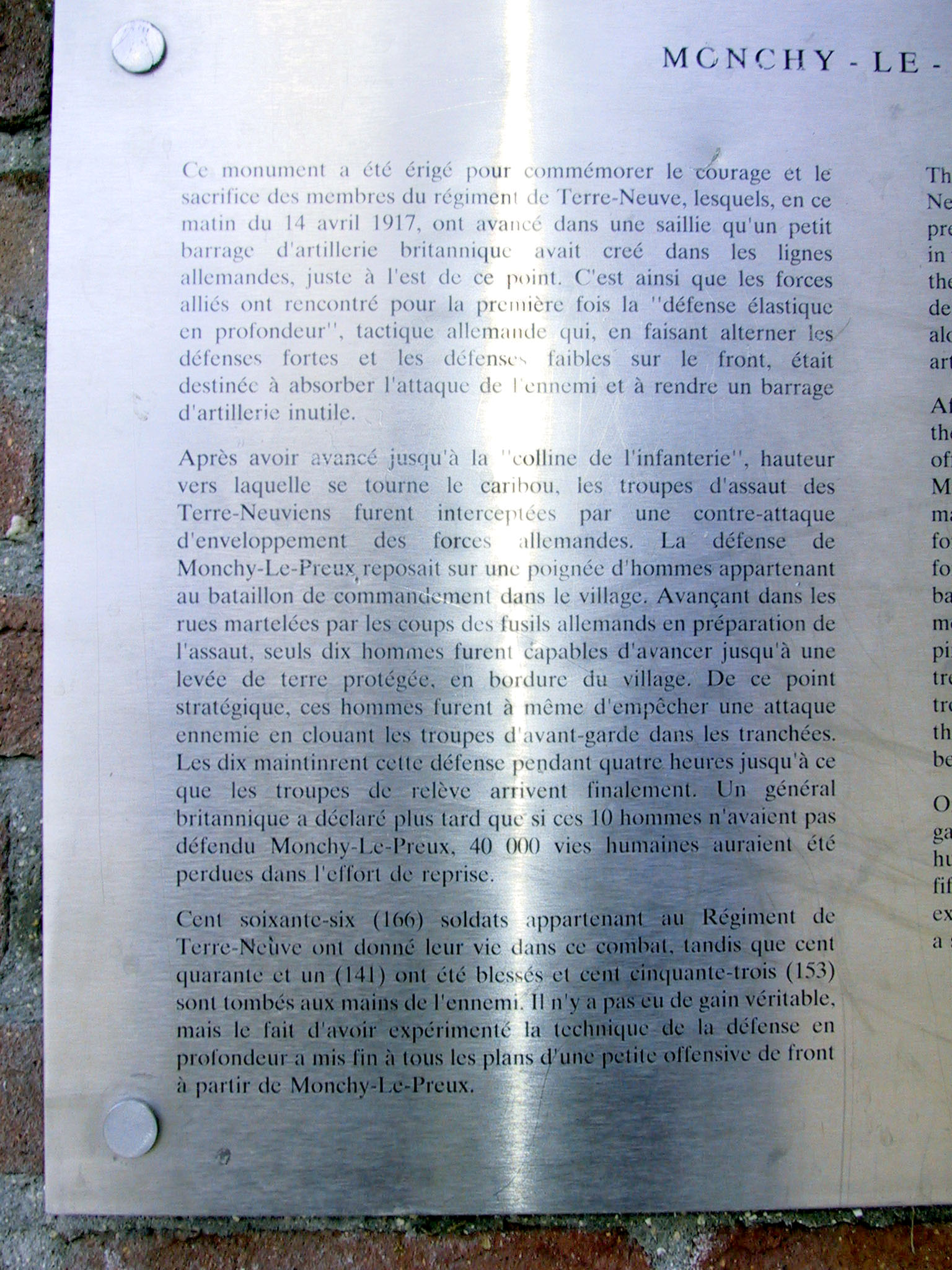
The commemorative plaque

== See also ==
- Communes of the Pas-de-Calais department
