= Bailleul-Sir-Berthoult =

- Commune
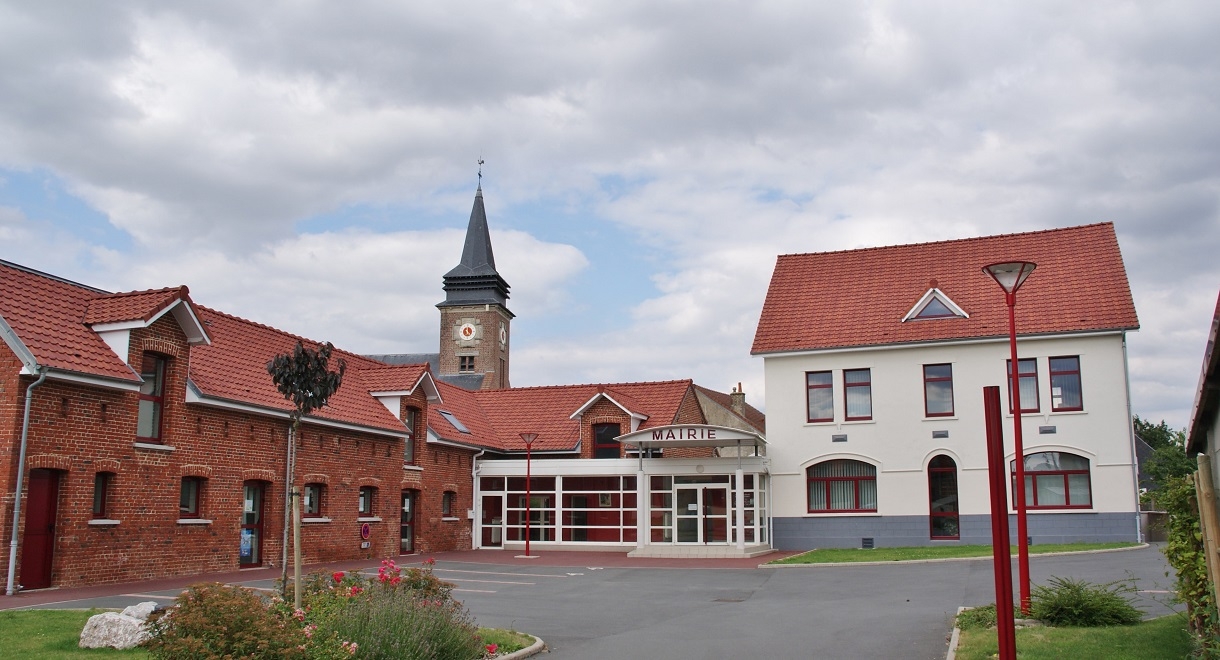
- The town hall of Bailleul-Sir-Berthoult

- Coat of arms
- Location of Bailleul-Sir-Berthoult
- Location within France Location within Hauts-de-France
- Coordinates: 50°20′21″N 2°51′04″E
- Country: France
- Region: Hauts-de-France
- Department: Pas-de-Calais
- Arrondissement: Arras
- Canton: Arras-2
- Intercommunality: CU d'Arras

Government
  - Mayor (2022–2026): Bernard Tournant
- Area^{1}: 9.35 km^{2} (3.61 sq mi)
- Elevation: 75 m (246 ft)
- Highest elevation: 114 m (374 ft)
- Lowest elevation: 58 m (190 ft)
- Population (2023): 1,429
  - Density: 153/km^{2} (396/sq mi)
- Time zone: UTC+01:00 (CET)
  - Summer (DST): UTC+02:00 (CEST)
- INSEE/Postal code: 62073 /62580
- ^{1} French Land Register data, which excludes lakes, ponds, glaciers > 1 km^{2} (0.386 sq mi or 247 acres) and river estuaries.

Bailleul-Sir-Berthoult is a commune in the Pas-de-Calais department in the Hauts-de-France region of France.

== Geography ==
A farming village located 5 miles (8 km) northeast of Arras at the junction of the D49 and D919 roads.

== Population ==
Historical population
Year	Pop.	±% p.a.
1968	941	—
1975	984	+0.64%
1982	1,028	+0.63%
1990	1,077	+0.58%
1999	1,148	+0.71%
2007	1,269	+1.26%
2012	1,245	−0.38%
2017	1,412	+2.55%
2023	1,429	+0.20%
Source: INSEE

== Sights ==
- The church of St. Jean-Baptiste, rebuilt after 1918, along with the rest of the village.
- The British Commonwealth cemetery.

== See also ==
- Communes of the Pas-de-Calais department
