= Willerval =

- Commune
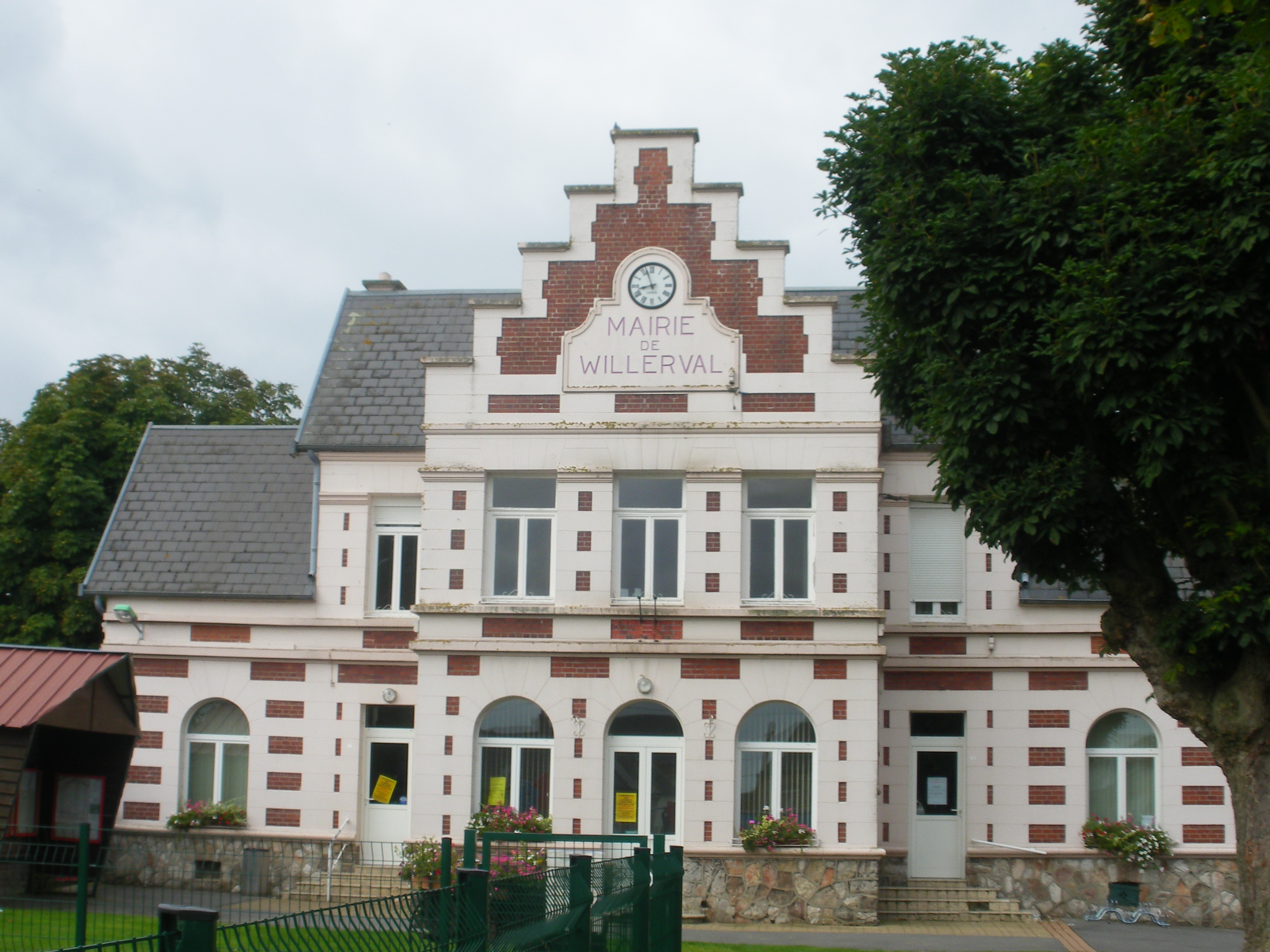
- The town hall of Willerval

- Coat of arms
- Location of Willerval
- Location within France Location within Hauts-de-France
- Coordinates: 50°21′28″N 2°50′43″E
- Country: France
- Region: Hauts-de-France
- Department: Pas-de-Calais
- Arrondissement: Arras
- Canton: Arras-2
- Intercommunality: Arras

Government
  - Mayor (2020–2026): Philippe Rousseau
- Area^{1}: 4.05 km^{2} (1.56 sq mi)
- Elevation: 76 m (249 ft)
- Highest elevation: 78 m (256 ft)
- Lowest elevation: 58 m (190 ft)
- Population (2023): 660
  - Density: 160/km^{2} (420/sq mi)
- Time zone: UTC+01:00 (CET)
  - Summer (DST): UTC+02:00 (CEST)
- INSEE/Postal code: 62892 /62580
- ^{1} French Land Register data, which excludes lakes, ponds, glaciers > 1 km^{2} (0.386 sq mi or 247 acres) and river estuaries.

Willerval is a commune in the Pas-de-Calais department in the Hauts-de-France region of France about 5 miles (8.0 km) north of Arras.

== Population ==
The inhabitants are called Willervalois in French.

Historical population
Year	Pop.	±% p.a.
1968	429	—
1975	448	+0.62%
1982	502	+1.64%
1990	603	+2.32%
1999	653	+0.89%
2007	611	−0.83%
2012	662	+1.62%
2017	651	−0.33%
2023	660	+0.23%
Source: INSEE

== See also ==
- Communes of the Pas-de-Calais department
