= Farbus =

- Commune
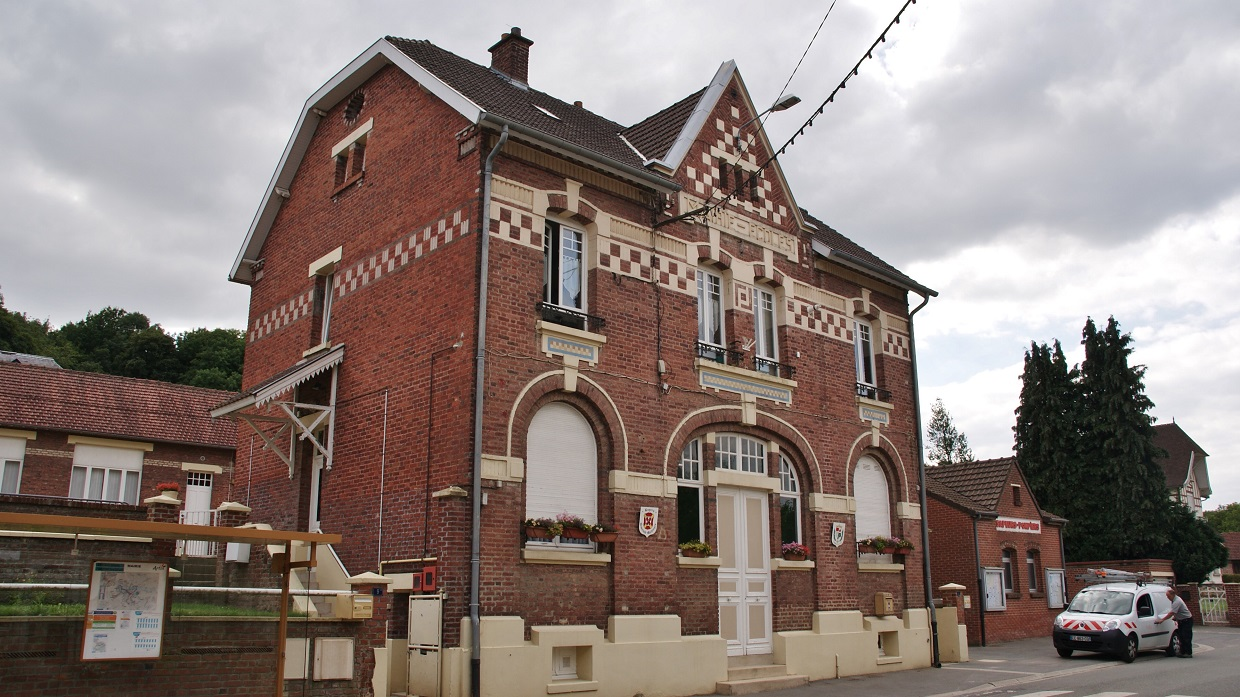
- The town hall of Farbus

- Coat of arms
- Location of Farbus
- Location within France Location within Hauts-de-France
- Coordinates: 50°21′28″N 2°49′30″E
- Country: France
- Region: Hauts-de-France
- Department: Pas-de-Calais
- Arrondissement: Arras
- Canton: Arras-2
- Intercommunality: CU d'Arras

Government
  - Mayor (2024–2026): Nicolas Vasseur
- Area^{1}: 3.49 km^{2} (1.35 sq mi)
- Elevation: 76 m (249 ft)
- Highest elevation: 139 m (456 ft)
- Lowest elevation: 61 m (200 ft)
- Population (2023): 629
  - Density: 180/km^{2} (467/sq mi)
- Time zone: UTC+01:00 (CET)
  - Summer (DST): UTC+02:00 (CEST)
- INSEE/Postal code: 62324 /62580
- ^{1} French Land Register data, which excludes lakes, ponds, glaciers > 1 km^{2} (0.386 sq mi or 247 acres) and river estuaries.

Farbus (French pronunciation: [faʁby]) is a commune in the Pas-de-Calais department in the Hauts-de-France region of France. It is located seven kilometres from the Canadian National Vimy Memorial dedicated to the Battle of Vimy Ridge (part of the Battle of Arras) and the missing First World War Canadian soldiers with no known grave; the Memorial is also the site of two Canadian cemeteries.

== Geography ==
A farming village situated 6 miles (9.7 km) northeast of Arras, at the junction of the D50 and D51 roads.

== Population ==
Historical population
| Year | Pop. | ±% p.a. |
|---|---|---|
| 1968 | 430 | — |
| 1975 | 473 | +1.37% |
| 1982 | 460 | −0.40% |
| 1990 | 529 | +1.76% |
| 1999 | 532 | +0.06% |
| 2007 | 540 | +0.19% |
| 2012 | 537 | −0.11% |
| 2017 | 557 | +0.73% |
| 2023 | 629 | +2.05% |
Source: INSEE

== Places of interest ==
- The church of St. Ranulphe, rebuilt after World War I
- The nearby Canadian National Vimy Memorial

== See also ==
- Communes of the Pas-de-Calais department
