= Louis de Maud'huy =

French general (1857–1921)

Louis Ernest de Maud'huy
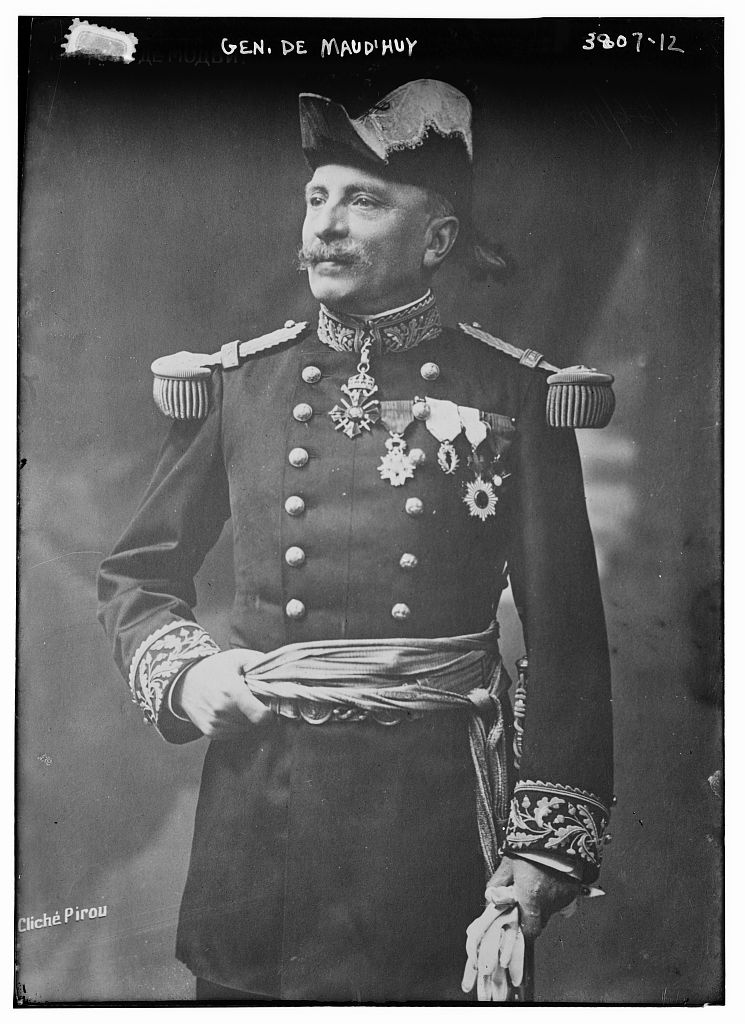
- Born: 17 February 1857; Metz, France
- Died: 16 July 1921 (aged 64); Paris, France
- Burial place: Les Invalides, Paris; 48°51′18″N 2°18′45″E
- Military career
- Allegiance: France
- Conflicts: World War I

Louis Ernest de Maud'huy (1857–1921) was a French World War I general and the first Chief Scout of Scouts de France.

== Biography ==
His father was Pierre Adrien de Maud'huy, Battalion Chief in the Napoleon III Imperial Guard and his mother was Thérèse Joséphine Olry. A "Lorrain from Moselle", he had been haunted by the idea of driving the Germans out from Lorraine since the 1871 defeat. He was then 14. Louis de Maud'huy graduated from Saint-Cyr and later the General Staff Course. He served as an infantry officer of chasseurs à pied until becoming a colonel and assuming command of the 35th Infantry Regiment in Belfort in 1907. On 10 July 1913, he was brigadier general in charge of the 80th Infantry Brigade.

An infantry Division Officer in 1914, he was placed in charge, after the Battle of the Frontiers, of the 18th Corps with which he fought in the First Battle of the Marne on the 5th Army left wing. A British liaison officer described how de Maud'huy encouraged a French deserter on the way to execution, telling the condemned man that his death would strengthen the army by deterring other would-be deserters and thus, "Yours also is a way of dying for France."

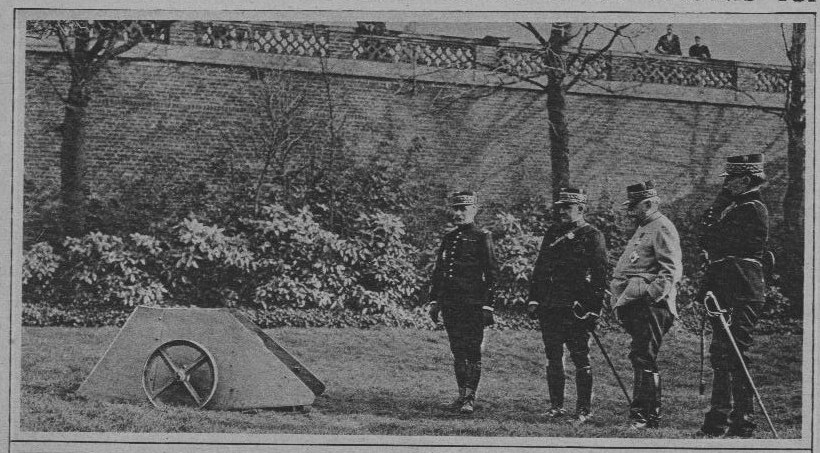
Foch, Maistre, Joffre et Maud'huy

During the First Battle of the Aisne, de Maud'huy crossed the Aisne at Pontavert on 13 September 1914 and captured Corbeny, Craonne and the eastern tip of Chemin des Dames. As a result of this, he was promoted to Divisional General, became a Commander of the Legion of Honour for his courage and was considered a specialist of night attacks. He assumed command of the French Tenth Army on the 29 September 1914 to extend northward the de Curières de Castelnau Second Army in the beginning of the Race to the Sea. Then the French Tenth Army attacked the advancing German forces on 1 October, initially experiencing success until they reached the town of Douai. There, the German Sixth Army launched a counter-attack along with additional attacks from three corps of the German First, Second and Seventh Armies: de Maud'huy lost Lens and was forced to withdraw towards Arras.

From 2 April to 3 November 1915, he was named to the head of the Seventh Army. From 2 April 1916 to 24 January 1917 he was in charge of the 15th Corps which meant a downgrading for him. On 25 January 1917, he was replaced by General de Riols de Fonclare and named to the head of the French 11th Army Corps involved in the Third Battle of the Aisne. As well as his chief General Duchêne, he was relieved of his command by French Prime Minister Georges Clemenceau on 2 June 1918, when Germans were seemingly within reach of Paris, and replaced by General Niessel. With the liberation of Metz in November 1918, Marshal Foch appointed him its Military Governor. After the war he entered politics. From 16 November 1919 to his death, he was elected to parliament as a deputy of National Bloc for Moselle. In July 1920, he became the first Chief Scout of Scouts de France. A Grand Cross of the Legion of Honour, he died in Paris on 16 July 1921. His remains are entombed in the Invalides.

== Bibliography ==
- de Maud'huy, Louis-Ernest (1919). Manœuvre, étude théorique (1911), précédée du testament militaire du colonel de Maud'huy à son régiment, Belfort 27 Mai 1912 [Manoeuvre, Theoretical Study (1911), Preceded by the Military Testament of Colonel de Maud'huy to his Regiment] (in French). Nancy-Paris-Strasbourg: Berger-Levrault. OCLC 162911639.
