= Leménil-Mitry =

- Commune
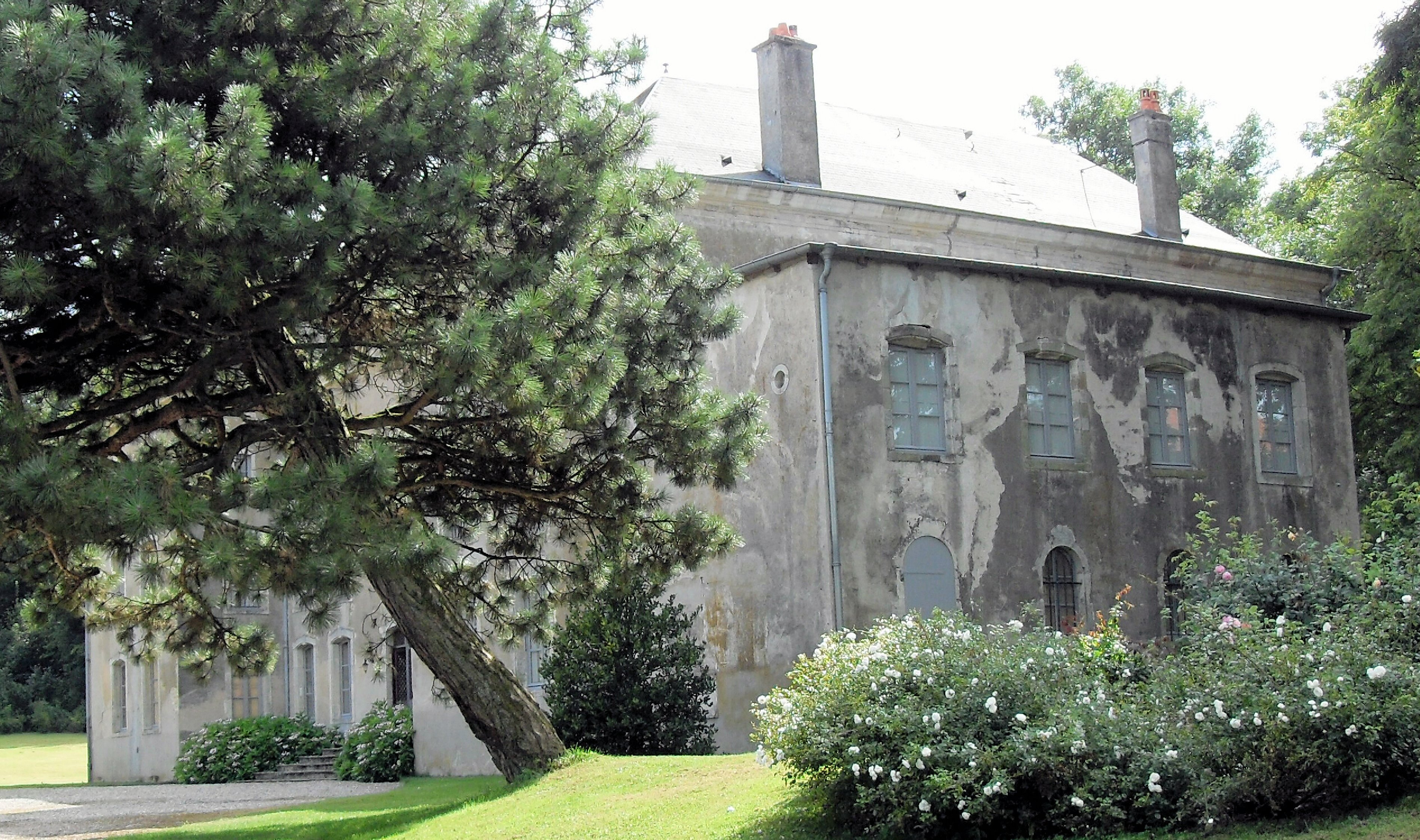
- The chateau in Leménil-Mitry

- Coat of arms
- Location of Leménil-Mitry
- Location within France Location within Grand Est
- Coordinates: 48°27′07″N 6°15′09″E
- Country: France
- Region: Grand Est
- Department: Meurthe-et-Moselle
- Arrondissement: Nancy
- Canton: Meine au Saintois
- Intercommunality: Pays du Saintois

Government
  - Mayor (2020–2026): Jean-Hyacinthe de Mitry
- Area^{1}: 3.43 km^{2} (1.32 sq mi)
- Elevation: 321 m (1,053 ft)
- Highest elevation: 360 m (1,180 ft)
- Lowest elevation: 280 m (920 ft)
- Population (2023): 2
  - Density: 0.58/km^{2} (1.5/sq mi)
- Time zone: UTC+01:00 (CET)
  - Summer (DST): UTC+02:00 (CEST)
- INSEE/Postal code: 54310 /54740
- ^{1} French Land Register data, which excludes lakes, ponds, glaciers > 1 km^{2} (0.386 sq mi or 247 acres) and river estuaries.

Leménil-Mitry (French pronunciation: [ləmenil mitʁi]) is a commune in the Meurthe-et-Moselle department in north-eastern metropolitan France.

As of 2023, it had only two inhabitants, making it one of the least-inhabited communes in France.

== Population ==
Historical population
Year	Pop.	±% p.a.
1968	4	—
1975	5	+3.24%
1982	4	−3.14%
1990	2	−8.30%
1999	2	+0.00%
2007	3	+5.20%
2012	3	+0.00%
2017	3	+0.00%
2023	2	−6.53%
Source: INSEE

== See also ==
- Communes of the Meurthe-et-Moselle department
