= Canton of Marquion =

Coordinates: 50°12′29″N 3°04′11″E

Marquion
- Former canton
- Interactive map of Marquion
- Country: France
- Region: Hauts-de-France
- Department: Pas-de-Calais
- No. of communes: {{{nbcomm}}}
- Disbanded: 2015
- Area: 138.11 km^{2} (53.32 sq mi)
- Population (2012): 11,433
  - Density: 82.782/km^{2} (214.40/sq mi)

The Canton of Marquion is a former canton in the department of the Pas-de-Calais and in the Nord-Pas-de-Calais region of northern France. It was disbanded following the French canton reorganisation that came into effect in March 2015. It consisted of 17 communes, which all joined the canton of Bapaume in 2015. It had a total of 11,433 inhabitants (2012).

== Geography ==
The canton was organised around Marquion in the arrondissement of Arras. The altitude varies from 32 m (105 ft) at Oisy-le-Verger to 127 m (417 ft) at Bourlon, with an average altitude of 66 m (217 ft).

The canton comprised 17 communes:

- Baralle
- Bourlon
- Buissy
- Écourt-Saint-Quentin
- Épinoy
- Graincourt-lès-Havrincourt
- Inchy-en-Artois
- Lagnicourt-Marcel
- Marquion
- Oisy-le-Verger
- Palluel
- Pronville
- Quéant
- Rumaucourt
- Sains-lès-Marquion
- Sauchy-Cauchy
- Sauchy-Lestrée

== Population ==
Population Evolution
1962	1968	1975	1982	1990	1999
10753	11073	10759	10802	10973	11149
Census count starting from 1962 : Population without double counting

== See also ==
- Arrondissements of the Pas-de-Calais department
- Cantons of Pas-de-Calais
- Communes of Pas-de-Calais
