= Communauté de communes de Marquion =

Coordinates: 50.2111°N 3.0876°E

Marquion
- Former communauté de communes
- Interactive map of Marquion
- Country: France
- Region: Hauts-de-France
- Department: Pas-de-Calais
- No. of communes: {{{nbcomm}}}
- Established: 2001
- Disbanded: 2014
- Population (1999): 11,149

The communauté de communes de Marquion is a former intercommunality in the Pas-de-Calais département of the Nord-Pas-de-Calais region of northern France. It was created in January 2001. It was merged into the Communauté de communes Osartis Marquion in January 2014.

== Participants ==
The communauté de communes comprised the following 17 communes:

1. Baralle
2. Bourlon
3. Buissy
4. Écourt-Saint-Quentin
5. Épinoy
6. Graincourt-lès-Havrincourt
7. Inchy-en-Artois
8. Lagnicourt-Marcel
9. Marquion
10. Oisy-le-Verger
11. Palluel
12. Pronville
13. Quéant
14. Rumaucourt
15. Sains-lès-Marquion
16. Sauchy-Cauchy
17. Sauchy-Lestrée

== See also ==
- Communes of the Pas-de-Calais department
