= List of aerial victories of Fritz Rumey =

Fritz Rumey was a German First World War fighter ace credited with 45 confirmed aerial victories.

== List of victories ==
This list is complete for entries, though obviously not for all details. Background data was abstracted from Above the Lines: The Aces and Fighter Units of the German Air Service, Naval Air Service and Flanders Marine Corps, 1914–1918, ISBN 978-0-948817-73-1, pp. 193–194. Abbreviations were expanded by the editor creating this list.

No.	Date/time	Victim	Squadron	Location	Remarks
1	6 July 1917 @ 1000 hours	Observation balloon		Boursies, France	
2	19 August 1917 @ 0820 hours	Royal Aircraft Factory R.E.8	No. 59 Squadron RFC	Épehy, France	
3	22 November 1917 @ 0910 hours	Sopwith Camel	No. 43 Squadron RFC	Marcoing, France	Ace Gerard Crole POW
4	23 November 1917 @ 1200 hours	Sopwith Camel	No. 3 Squadron RFC	Bourlon Wood, France	
5	23 November 1917 @ 1300 hours	Armstrong Whitworth FK.8	No. 8 Squadron RFC	Southwest of Marcoing, France	
6	13 January 1918 @ 1230 hours	Bristol F.2 Fighter	No. 11 Squadron RFC	South of Beaumont, France	
7	28 January 1918 @ 1215 hours	Bristol F.2 Fighter	No. 11 Squadron RFC	Graincourt-lès-Havrincourt, France	
8	29 January 1918 @ 1210 hours	Airco DH.4	No. 25 Squadron RFC	Saint-Quentin, France	
9	26 February 1918 @ 1600 hours	Airco DH.4	No. 25 Squadron RFC	North of Bussigny	
10	17 March 1918 @ 1025 hours	Royal Aircraft Factory SE.5a		Marcoing, France	
11	23 March 1918 @ 1320 hours	Sopwith Dolphin	No. 79 Squadron RFC	Cartigny, France	
12	24 March 1918	Royal Aircraft Factory R.E.8			
13	28 March 1918 @ 0910 hours	Sopwith Camel	No. 43 Squadron RFC	Bray-sur-Somme, France	
14	12 April 1918 @ 1900 hours	Sopwith Dolphin		Northwest of Albert, France	
15	Afternoon of 2 May 1918	Sopwith Camel	No. 65 Squadron RAF	Villers-Bretonneux, France	
16	9 May 1918	Breguet 14		North of Villequier, France	
17	10 May 1918	Royal Aircraft Factory SE.5a	No. 56 Squadron RAF	East of Hamel, France	
18	16 May 1918	Royal Aircraft Factory SE.5a	No. 84 Squadron RAF	Southwest of Courcelette, France	
19	17 May 1918	Royal Aircraft Factory SE.5a		Puzieux, France	
20	18 May 1918	SPAD		Moreuil, France	
21	20 May 1918	Sopwith Camel	No. 65 Squadron RAF	South of Morlancourt, France	
22	2 June 1918 @ 1910 hours	Sopwith Camel		Hangard, France	
23	7 June 1918	Royal Aircraft Factory SE.5a	No. 24 Squadron RAF	Rosières, (Note: There are several places in France called Rosières, some of them in the east and northeast. It is unclear which this one was.) France	Ace James Dawe KIA
24	25 June 1918	Royal Aircraft Factory SE.5a	No. 24 Squadron RAF	West of Albert, France	
25	26 June 1918 @ 2025 hours	Sopwith Camel	No. 65 Squadron RAF	East of Bouzincourt, France	Ace Edward Carter Eaton KIA
26	27 June 1918	Sopwith Dolphin	No. 23 Squadron RAF	Vicinity of the Somme, France	
27	27 June 1918	Sopwith Camel	No. 70 Squadron RAF	Bray-sur-Somme, France	
28	1 July 1918	Sopwith Camel	No. 65 Squadron RAF		
29	3 July 1918	Sopwith Camel			
30	3 September 1918 @ 1847 hours	Airco DH.9	No. 98 Squadron RAF	North of Bertincourt, France	
31	4 September 1918 @ 1830 hours	Sopwith Camel		Queant, France	
32	5 September 1918 @ 1005 hours	Royal Aircraft Factory SE.5a		North of Bouchain, France	
33	7 September 1918 @ 1125 hours	Airco DH.4	No. 205 Squadron RAF	Saint-Quentin, France	
34	14 September 1918 @ 1110 hours	Royal Aircraft Factory SE.5a	No. 84 Squadron RAF	South of Le Catelet, France	
35	16 September 1918 @ 0900 hours	Airco DH.9	No. 57 Squadron RAF	Villers-Guislain, France	
36	16 September 1918 @ 1230 hours	Royal Aircraft Factory SE.5a		Marquion, France	
37	16 September 1918 @ 1235 hours	Sopwith Camel	No. 3 Squadron RAF	Marquion, France	
38	17 September 1918 @ 0905	Royal Aircraft Factory SE.5a	No. 84 Squadron RAF	Rumilly, France	
39	17 September 1918 @ 1300 hours	Sopwith Camel	17th Aero Squadron, USAAS	Northwest of Cambrai, France	
40	17 September 1918 @ 1910 hours	Sopwith Camel	No. 46 Squadron RAF	Southwest of Cambrai, France	
41	23 September 1918 @ 1815 hours	Sopwith Dolphin	No. 87 Squadron RAF	Southwest of Baralle, France and Queant, France	
42	24 September 1918 @ 0820 hours	Royal Aircraft Factory SE.5a		South of Buissy, France	
43	26 September 1918 @ 1410 hours	Airco DH.4		Gouzeaucourt, France	
44	26 September 1918 @ 1805 hours	Bristol F.2 Fighter	"L" Flight	Cambrai, France	
45	27 September 1918 @ 1208 hours	Sopwith Camel	No. 54 Squadron RAF	East of Marquion, France	

== Sources ==
- Shores, Christopher F; Franks, Norman L R; Guest, Russell (1990), Above the Trenches: a Complete Record of the Fighter Aces and Units of the British Empire Air Forces 1915-1920, Grubb Street, ISBN 978-0-948817-19-9
