= James Anderson Slater =

British First World War flying ace

- Born: 27 November 1896; Worthing, Sussex, England
- Died: 26 November 1925 (aged 28); Pewsey, Wiltshire, England
- Burial place: St. Mary the Virgin, Upavon, Wiltshire, England; 51°17′43″N 1°48′44″W
- Military career
- Allegiance: United Kingdom
- Branch: British Army; Royal Air Force
- Service years: 1914–1925
- Rank: Flight Lieutenant
- Nickname: Jimmy
- Units: Royal Sussex Regiment; No. 18 Squadron RFC; No. 1 Squadron RFC; No. 64 Squadron RFC/RAF; No. 3 Squadron RAF
- Conflicts: World War I • Western Front
- Awards: Military Cross & Bar; Distinguished Flying Cross

Flight Lieutenant James Anderson Slater MC*, DFC (27 November 1896 – 26 November 1925) was a British First World War flying ace, credited with 24 aerial victories. He served in the Royal Air Force (RAF) as an instructor after the war until killed in a flying accident.

== World War I service ==
Slater was born in Worthing, West Sussex on 29 November 1896. He was studying at a seminary in August 1914 when the First World War broke out, with Slater quickly enlisting in the British Army's Royal Sussex Regiment as a private. He was commissioned as a temporary second lieutenant on 29 September, briefly serving with the Royal Irish Rifles (where his father served with the rank of Major) before re-joining the Sussexes. In 1915 he transferred to the Royal Flying Corps and served in France with No. 18 Squadron RFC as an observer on the squadron's Vickers FB.5s from November 1915 to March 1916. He then trained as a pilot, and on 30 June 1916 was appointed a flying officer.

Slater was posted to No. 1 Squadron RFC in August 1916, to fly the Nieuport 17 single-seat fighter, and gained his first two aerial victories in February and March 1917. He was promoted to lieutenant on 1 April 1917. In May he returned to England to serve as an instructor until 27 July 1917, when he was appointed a flight commander with the acting-rank of captain in the newly formed No. 64 Squadron RFC. The squadron was based at Sedgeford, Norfolk, where Slater was reported to have "beat up Hunstanton at 8 a.m. on Sunday mornings, buzzing his girlfriend's house at chimney pot height", and to have been in the habit of flying his aircraft through the aerodrome's hangars.

Slater's squadron moved to France in October 1917, where on 30 November he shot down the squadron's first enemy aircraft, flying an Airco DH.5 fighter. On 4 February 1918 he was awarded the Military Cross, for several successful ground attack missions. His citation read:

Temporary Second Lieutenant (Temporary Captain) James Anderson Slater, General List and RFC.

"For conspicuous gallantry and devotion to duty. When returning from a patrol he attacked enemy infantry, silenced a field gun and fired on transport. On another occasion he silenced a battery in very difficult weather conditions, fired on ammunition wagons and enemy infantry, and brought back his patrol safely. He also led a patrol of twelve machines in very bad weather to attack a wood held by the enemy. His patrol dropped over thirty bombs, fired 3,000 rounds and drove the enemy from the wood with heavy casualties. In the course of this flight six enemy scouts were engaged and driven off. Later, he led a similar patrol with great success. He showed splendid courage and determination."

The squadron was then re-equipped with the S.E.5a fighter, in which Slater achieved the majority of his victories, being credited with 20 enemy aircraft shot down between 8 March and 31 May 1918.

Slater received a bar to his Military Cross, gazetted on 21 June 1918. His citation read:

Temporary Captain James Anderson Slater, MC, General List and RFC.

"For conspicuous gallantry and devotion to duty. On one occasion during the recent, operations he attacked a large formation of hostile scouts, one of which he drove down in flames. Later, during the same flight, he took part in a general engagement, in which he drove down another enemy machine completely out of control. Two days later he attacked two enemy scouts, causing one of them to crash to earth. In eighteen days he has engaged in twenty-five combats at close quarters, shooting down eight hostile machines. His great gallantry and fine offensive spirit have inspired all ranks to a very high degree."

He was awarded the Distinguished Flying Cross on 28 June 1918 "in recognition of acts of gallantry and distinguished service". His citation read:

Lieutenant (Temporary Captain) James Anderson Slater, MC.

"This officer has led numerous offensive patrols with the utmost skill and determination, and it is entirely due to his fine leadership that many enemy aircraft have been destroyed with the minimum of casualties to his formation."

Slater returned to the Home Establishment in England in July 1918, to serve as an instructor until the end of the war. His final tally consisted of eleven enemy aircraft destroyed (one shared), and nine driven down "out of control" (three shared).

=== List of aerial victories ===
Combat record
No.	Date/Time	Aircraft/ Serial No.	Opponent	Result	Location	Notes
No. 1 Squadron RFC
1	15 February 1917 @ 1230	Nieuport 17 (A6613)	Albatros D.II	Driven down out of control	Warneton	
2	17 March 1917 @ 1045	Nieuport 17 (A6624)	Albatros D.III	Driven down out of control	Courtrai–Menen	Shared with Second Lieutenant Cecil Clark.
No. 64 Squadron RFC
3	30 November 1917 @ 1045	D.H.5 (A9458)	DFW C	Driven down out of control	Bourlon Wood	
4	8 March 1918 @ 1040	S.E.5a	Pfalz D.III	Driven down out of control	Cambrai	
5	11 March 1918 @ 1130	S.E.5a (B147)	Pfalz D.III	Driven down out of control	Cambrai	
6	11 March 1918 @ 1157	S.E.5a (B147)	Albatros D.V	Destroyed in flames	Douai	
7	15 March 1918 @ 1120	S.E.5a (B147)	Albatros D.V	Driven down out of control	Masnières	
8	21 March 1918 @ 1205	S.E.5a (B147)	Albatros D.V	Destroyed	Inchy-en-Artois	
9	21 March 1918 @ 1335	S.E.5a (B147)	Fokker Dr.I	Driven down out of control	Bourlon Wood	Shared with Lieutenant V. W. Thompson.
10	21 March 1918 @ 1335	S.E.5a (B147)	Albatros D.V	Driven down out of control	Bourlon Wood	Shared with Lieutenant V. W. Thompson.
11	23 March 1918 @ 1040	S.E.5a	Pfalz D.III	Destroyed	Pronville	
12	23 March 1918 @ 1555	S.E.5a (B147)	Fokker Dr.I	Driven down out of control	Graincourt	
13	30 March 1918 @ 1150	S.E.5a (D289)	Type C	Destroyed	Croiselles	Shared with Lieutenant Philip Burge.
No. 64 Squadron RAF
14	1 April 1918 @ 0715	S.E.5a (D289)	Pfalz D.III	Destroyed in flames	Maricourt	
15	20 April 1918 @ 0945	S.E.5a (D289)	Albatros D.V	Driven down out of control	Neuf-Berquin	
16	20 April 1918 @ 0945	S.E.5a (D289)	Pfalz D.III	Driven down out of control	Neuf-Berquin	
17	16 May 1918 @ 0940	S.E.5a (B7786)	Albatros D.V	Destroyed in flames	South-west of Brebières	
18	19 May 1918 @ 1955–2000	S.E.5a (B7786)	Albatros D.V	Destroyed	East of Oppy	
19	19 May 1918 @ 1955–2000	S.E.5a (B7786)	Pfalz D.III	Destroyed	Brebières	
20	26 May 1918 @ 1930	S.E.5a (B7786)	Albatros D.V	Destroyed in flames	Erquinghem-Lys	
21	27 May 1918 @ 1055	S.E.5a (B7786)	Albatros D.V	Destroyed	Cagnicourt	
22	29 May 1918 @ 1940	S.E.5a (C1880)	Pfalz D.III	Destroyed	La Bassée–Boyelles	
23	31 May 1918 @ 1940–1942	S.E.5a	Pfalz D.III	Destroyed	La Bassée	
24	31 May 1918 @ 1940–1942	S.E.5a	Pfalz D.III	Driven down out of control	La Bassée	

== Post-war career ==
On 1 August 1919 Slater was granted a permanent commission in the Royal Air Force with the rank of flight lieutenant. He served as an instructor at No. 5 Flying Training School (Inland Area) at RAF Shotwick until transferred to No. 4 Flying Training School (Middle East Area) at Abu Sueir, Egypt, on 8 March 1922, finally returning to Home Establishment on 18 October 1924, and being posted to the RAF Depot (Non-effective Pool).

On 1 April 1925 Slater was posted to No. 3 Squadron, based at RAF Upavon, home of the Central Flying School. On 26 November 1925 Slater and Pilot Officer W. J. R. Early were killed in a flying accident, when their dual control Sopwith Snipe trainer crashed at nearby Pewsey, soon after take-off. Both men are buried in the churchyard of St. Mary the Virgin, Upavon.
