= List of aerial victories of Werner Voss =

Leutnant Werner Voss (13 April 1897 – 23 September 1917) was a friendly rival of World War I's leading ace, Manfred von Richthofen. Richthofen himself considered Voss as the only pilot with the potential to exceed Richthofen's aerial victory score. When Voss was killed in action, he had scored 48 victories.

== Werner Voss's victories ==
Confirmed victories are numbered and listed chronologically. Unconfirmed victories are denoted by "u/c".

When two casualties are listed in Notes column, the first listed is the pilot, the other the aerial observer/gunner. Conflicting claims denoted by *, although only one counts as a confirmed victory according to either source.

Doubled horizontal lines mark changes in squadron assignments.

| No. | Date/time | Aircraft | Foe | Result | Location | Notes |
|---|---|---|---|---|---|---|
| 1 | 27 November 1916 @ 09:40 hours | Albatros | Nieuport 17 serial number A281 from 60 Squadron | Shot down | Miraumont, France | Captain George Alec Parker missing in action |
| 2 | 27 November 1916 @ 14:15 hours | Albatros | Royal Aircraft Factory FE.2b s/n 4915 from 18 Squadron | Shot down in flames | South of Bapaume, France | Lieutenant F. A. George wounded in action; Air Mechanic 1st Class Oliver Frederick Watts killed in action |
| 3 | 21 December 1916 @ 11:00 hours | Albatros | Royal Aircraft Factory B.E.2d s/n 5782 from 7 Squadron | Shot down | Miraumont, France | Lieutenant D. W. Davis WIA; Second Lieutenant William Martin Vernon Cotton KIA |
| 4 | 1 February 1917 @ 16:00 hours | Albatros | Airco D.H.2 s/n A2614 from 29 Squadron | Shot down | Achiet-le-Petit | Captain Albert Peter Vincent Daly WIA, prisoner of war |
| 5 | 4 February 1917 @ 14:40 hours | Albatros | Royal Aircraft Factory B.E.2d s/n 5927 from 16 Squadron | Shot down | Givenchy, France | Second Lieutenant Herbert Martin-Massey WIA; Second Lieutenant Noel Mark Hodson Vernham KIA |
| 6 | 10 February 1917 @ 11:15 hours | Albatros | Airco D.H.2 s/n A2548 from 32 Squadron | Damaged | Southwest of Serre | Captain Leslie Peech Aizlewood returned to base unhurt |
| 7 | 25 February 1917 @ 14:55 hours | Albatros | Airco D.H.2 s/n A2557 from 29 Squadron | Shot down | Arras-Saint Sauveur | Lieutenant Reginald J. S. Lund WIA |
| 8 | 25 February 1917 @ 15:00 hours | Albatros | Airco D.H.2 s/n 7849 from 29 Squadron | Damaged | Arras, France | Captain H. J. Payn's returned to base unhurt |
| 9 | 26 February 1917 @ 16:50 hours | Halberstadt | Royal Aircraft Factory B.E.2c s/n 2535 from 16 Squadron | Shot down | Écurie, France | Lieutenant H. E. Bagot WIA; Second Lieutenant Robert Lawrence Munro Jack died of wounds |
| 10 | 27 February 1917 @ 10:45 hours | Albatros | Royal Aircraft Factory B.E.2e s/n 2530 from 8 Squadron | Shot down in flames | Blairville, France | Second Lieutenants Edwin Albert Pope and Hubert Alfred Johnson KIA |
| 11 | 27 February 1917 @ 16:48 hours | Albatros | Royal Aircraft Factory B.E.2c s/n 7197 from 12 Squadron | Shot down | West of Arras | Captain John McArthur and Private James Whiteford KIA |
| 12 | 4 March 1917 @ 11:30 hours | Albatros | Royal Aircraft Factory B.E.2d s/n 6252 from 8 Squadron | Shot down in flames | South of Berneville, France | Sergeant Reginald James Moody and Second Lieutenant Edmund Eric Horn KIA |
| 13 | 6 March 1917 @ 16:35 hours | Albatros | Airco D.H.2 s/n 7941 from 32 Squadron | Shot down | Favreuil, France | Captain Herbert Gordon Southon WIA, POW |
| 14 | 11 March 1917 @ 10:00 hours | Albatros | Royal Aircraft Factory F.E.2b s/n 7685 from 22 Squadron | Shot down | Rancourt, France | Second Lieutenant Leslie W. Beale and Air Mechanic 2nd Class F. G. Davis WIA |
| 15 | 11 March 1917 @ 14:30 hours | Albatros | Nieuport 17 s/n A279 from 60 Squadron | Shot down | Bailleul, France | Arthur D. Whitehead WIA, POW |
| 16 | 17 March 1917 @ 12:15 hours | Albatros | Royal Aircraft Factory F.E.2b s/n 7695 from 11 Squadron | Shot down | Northeast of Berlencourt-le-Cauroy, France | Second Lieutenant Russell W. Cross and Lieutenant Christopher F. Lodge WIA |
| 17 | 17 March 1917 @ 12:25 hours | Albatros | Airco D.H.2 s/n A2583 from 32 Squadron | Shot down | Northeast of Berlencourt-le-Cauroy | Lieutenant Theodore A. Cooch WIA |
| 18 | 18 March 1917 @ 18:40 hours | Albatros | Royal Aircraft Factory B.E.2e s/n 5784 from 8 Squadron | Shot down in flames | Neuville, France | Second Lieutenant Charles R. Dougal WIA; Second Lieutenant Sydney Harryman POW/WIA/DOW |
| 19 | 18 March 1917 @ 18:50 hours | Albatros | Royal Aircraft Factory B.E.2d s/n 5750 from 13 Squadron | Shot down; aircrew and aircraft strafed on ground | Boyelles, France | Captain Guy Stafford Thorne DOW; Second Lieutenant Philip Edward Hislop van Baerle POW |
| 20 | 19 March 1917 @ 09:30 hours | Albatros | Royal Aircraft Factory R.E.8 s/n A4165 from 59 Squadron | Shot down | Saint-Léger, France | Captain Eldred Wolferstan Bowyer-Bower and Second Lieutenant Eric Elgey KIA |
| 21 | 24 March 1917 @ 16:10 hours | Albatros | Royal Aircraft Factory F.E.2b s/n A5485 from 23 Squadron | Shot down | Between Vaulx and Morchies | Sergeant Edward P. Critchley WIA; Air Mechanic 1st Class Frank Russell KIA |
| 22 | 24 March 1917 @ 16:45 hours | Albatros | Royal Aircraft Factory B.E.2d s/n 5769 from 8 Squadron | Shot down | Boileux-Boiry | Lieutenant Hugh Norton and Second Lieutenant Reginald Alfred William Tillett KIA |
| 23 | 1 April 1917 @ 11:45 hours | Albatros | Royal Aircraft Factory B.E.2c s/n 2561 from 15 Squadron | Shot down; aircraft strafed on ground | East of Saint-Léger, France | Captain Arthur Meredith Wynne WIA; Lieutenant Adrian Somerset MacKenzie KIA |
| 24 | 6 April 1917 @ 09:30 hours | Albatros | Royal Aircraft Factory B.E.2c s/n A3157 from 15 Squadron | Shot down | South of Lagnicourt-Marcel, France | Second Lieutenants Albert Higgs Vinson and Everard Champion Gwilt crashlanded within British lines |
| u/c | 6 April 1917 @ 09:45 hours | Albatros | Sopwith Pup s/n A6165 from 54 Squadron | Forced to land | South of Lagnicourt-Marcel, France | Second Lieutenant Robert M. Foster survived |
| 25 | 7 May 1917 @ 19:25 hours | Albatros | Royal Aircraft Factory SE.5 s/n A4867 from 56 Squadron | Shot down | Between Étaing and Lecuse | Second Lieutenant Roger Michael Chaworth-Musters KIA |
| 26 | 9 May 1917 @ 14:00 hours | Albatros | Royal Aircraft Factory B.E.2c s/n 7209 from 52 Squadron | Exploded | Havrincourt, France | Lieutenant Roland Humphrey Coles and Second Lieutenant John Charles Sigismund Day KIA |
| 27 | 9 May 1917 @ 16:45 hours | Albatros | Sopwith Pup s/n A6174 from 54 Squadron | Shot down | Lesdain, France | Lieutenant George Copland Temple Hadrill POW |
| 28 | 9 May 1917 @ 16:50 hours | Albatros | Royal Aircraft Factory F.E.2b s/n 4991 from 22 Squadron | Shot down | Le Bosquet | Second Lieutenants Charles McKenzie Furlonger and Charles William Lane POW |
| 29 | 23 May 1917 @ 14:25 hours | Albatros D.III | Royal Aircraft Factory F.E.2b s/n A5502 from 18 Squadron | Shot down | North of Havrincourt | Second Lieutenant Wilfred Ferguson MacDonald and Lieutenant Frank Charles Shackell KIA |
| 30 | 26 May 1917 @ 15:45 hours | Albatros D.III | Sopwith Pup s/n A6168 From 54 Squadron | Shot down | Southwest of Gouzeaucourt, France | Second Lieutenant Mortimer George Cole WIA |
| 31 | 28 May 1917 @ 14:00 hours | Albatros D.III | Royal Aircraft Factory F.E.2d s/n A6378 from 25 Squadron | Shot down | Southeast of Douai, France | Captain Aubrey de Selincourt and Lieutenant Henry Cotton POW |
| 32 | 4 June 1917 @ 07:10 hours | Albatros D.III | Sopwith Pup s/n B2151 from 54 Squadron | Shot down | Aubencheul-aux-Bois, France | Captain Reginald George Hewett Pixley KIA |
| 33 | 5 June 1917 @ 09:30 hours | Albatros D.III | Royal Aircraft Factory F.E.2b s/n A857 from 22 Squadron | Shot down | North of Vaucelles | Captain Francis Percival Don and Lieutenant Herbert Harris POW |
| 34 | 6 June 1917 @ 13:10 hours | Albatros D.III | Nieuport 17 s/n N3204 from 6 Naval Squadron | Shot down | West of Graincourt-lès-Havrincourt, France | Sub-Lieutenant Fabian Pember Reeves of the RNAS KIA |
| 35 | 10 August 1917 @ 16:25 hours | Albatros D.III | Spad XIII from Escadrille 31 of the Aéronautique Militaire | Shot down | South of Diksmuide, Belgium | Captain Henri Rousseau MIA |
| 36 | 15 August 1917 @ 19:10 hours | Albatros D.III | Royal Aircraft Factory F.E.2b s/n A5152 from 20 Squadron | Shot down | Zillebeke Lake | Second Lieutenant Charles H. Cameron unhurt; Private Stanley Edward Pilbrow KIA |
| 37 | 16 August 1917 @ 21:00 hours | Albatros D.III | Sopwith Camel s/n B3756 from 70 Squadron | Disappeared | St. Julien | Captain Noel William Ward Webb MIA |
| 38 | 23 August 1917 @ 10:10 hours | Albatros D.III | Spad VII s/n B3528 from 19 Squadron | Crashlanded at 23 Squadron's airfield | Southwest of Diksmuide, Belgium | Captain Arthur Lionel Gordon-Kidd WIA/DOW |
| 39 | 3 September 1917 @ 09:52 hours | Fokker Triplane s/n 103/17 | Sopwith Camel s/n 3917 from 45 Squadron | Shot down | North of Houthem | Lieutenant Aubrey Talley Heywood KIA |
| 40* | 5 September 1917 @ 14:50 hours | Fokker Triplane s/n 103/17 | Sopwith Pup s/n B1842 from 46 Squadron | Crashlanded trailing blue smoke | St. Julien | Second Lieutenant Charles Walter Odell unharmed |
| 40* | 5 September 1917 @ 15:50 hours | Fokker Triplane s/n 103/17 | Airco DH.5 s/n A9374 from 32 Squadron | Crashed into Ypres Canal | St. Julien | Lieutenant William Edwin Sandys KIA |
| 41 | 5 September 1917 @ 16:30 hours | Fokker Triplane s/n 103/17 | Caudron two-seater s/n G.6 from Escadrille 53 | Shot down | Bixschoote | Maréchal des logis Jacques Thabaud-Desthouilieres and Lieutenant Marcel Mulard KIA |
| 42 | 6 September 1917 @ 16:35 hours | Fokker Triplane s/n 103/17 | Royal Aircraft Factory F.E.2d s/n B1895 from 20 Squadron | Shot down in flames | Saint Julien/Boesinghe | Lieutenant John Oscar Pilkington and Air Mechanic 2nd Class Herbert Frederick Matthews KIA |
| 43 | 10 September 1917 @ 17:50 hours | Fokker Triplane s/n 103/17 | Sopwith Camel s/n B3927 from 70 Squadron | Shot down | Between Passendale and Langemarck | Second Lieutenant Arthur Jackson Smith Sisley KIA |
| 44 | 10 September 1917 @ 17:55 hours | Fokker Triplane s/n 103/17 | Sopwith Camel s/n B3787 from 70 Squadron | Shot down | Between Passendale and Langemarck | 2nd Lt Oliver Charles Pearson MIA |
| 45 | 10 September 1917 @ 18:15 hours | Fokker Triplane s/n 103/17 | Spad VII from Escadrille 31 | Shot down | Paschendaele-Westroosebeke | Adjutant Jules Tiberghein KIA |
| 46 | 11 September 1917 @ 10:30 hours | Fokker Triplane s/n 103/17 | Bristol F.2 Fighter s/n B1105 from 22 Squadron | Shot down | Langemarck | Second Lieutenant R. de Lacey Stedman WIA; Second Lieutenant Harry Edward Jones KIA |
| 47 | 11 September 1917 @ 16:25 hours | Fokker Triplane s/n 103/17 | Sopwith Camel B6236 from 45 Squadron | Shot down | East of Saint Julien | Lieutenant Oscar Lennox McMaking KIA |
| 48 | 23 September 1917 @ 09:30 hours | Fokker Triplane s/n 103/17 | Airco D.H.4 s/n A7643 from 57 Squadron | Shot down in flames | Ledegem, Belgium | Second Lieutenants Samuel Leslie John Bramley and John Matthew Delacey KIA |
