= Achiet =

Achiet may refer to two communes in the Pas-de-Calais department in northern France:

- Achiet-le-Grand
- Achiet-le-Petit
