= Phillip Scott Burge =

British World War I flying ace

- Born: 29 March 1895; Potters Bar, Middlesex, England
- Died: 24 July 1918 (aged 23) near Seclin, France
- Burial place: Dud Corner Cemetery, Loos, Pas de Calais, France
- Military career
- Allegiance: United Kingdom
- Branch: British Army; Royal Air Force
- Rank: Captain
- Unit: No. 64 Squadron RAF
- Awards: Military Cross; Military Medal

Phillip Scott Burge, MC, MM (29 March 1895 – 24 July 1918) was a World War One fighter pilot and flying ace. He was killed in action over France in 1918 after earning the Military Cross.

== Early life ==
Burge was a student at Marlborough College prior to World War I. He joined the British Army early in the war and was awarded the Military Medal in mid-1916 while serving with the Royal Fusiliers. He was transferred and commissioned in the Royal Flying Corps in 1917.

== First World War ==
On 27 February 1917, Burge was commissioned as a probationary temporary second lieutenant and was appointed as a flying officer on 24 May 1917. On 14 October, he was assigned to 64 Squadron as a Royal Aircraft Factory SE.5a pilot. He scored his first aerial victory on 23 March 1918, when he destroyed a Fokker Dr.I triplane fighter over Bourlon Wood. One week later, he and James Anderson Slater shared in the destruction of a German two-seater reconnaissance aeroplane over Croisilles, France. On 1 April, he destroyed an Albatros D.V fighter over Méricourt. Burge was promoted from lieutenant to temporary captain while on active flight status on 20 April 1918.

On 3 May 1918, Burge shared in the destruction of a Rumpler reconnaissance aircraft over Mercatel. On 16 May, he shot down two more aircraft in the same dogfight, destroying an Albatros D.V and driving another down out of control. On consecutive days 20 and 21 May 1918, he destroyed two Halberstadt reconnaissance machines for his seventh and eighth kills.

His next success was on 19 July 1918, when he destroyed another Fokker triplane south of Lille. The next day, Burge, Edmund Tempest, and another pilot cooperated to ruin a Rumpler over Drocourt. On 22 July 1918, Burge shot down an aircraft for the last time, destroying an Albatros D.V over Harnes. His final tally was six solo victories, three more shared victories and two enemy fighters sent down out of control.

On 24 July 1918, Phillip Scott Burge was killed in action when his plane caught fire. The pilot who shot him down is generally believed to be Unteroffizier Marat Schumm of Jagdstaffel 52. Burge was interred in Dud Corner Cemetery in Loos, Pas-de-Calais, France.

On 16 September 1918, Burge's award of the Military Cross was gazetted posthumously. It read:

"For conspicuous gallantry and devotion to duty. This officer is a brilliant fighting pilot, and has destroyed six enemy aeroplanes. His dash and determination when engaged in combat with the enemy, often numerically superior, have set a fine example to the remainder of his formation."

== Bibliography ==
- Franks, Norman (2007). SE 5/5a Aces of World War I: Volume 78 of Aircraft of the Aces. London, UK: Osprey Publishing. ISBN 978-1-84603-180-9.
- Shore, Christopher, et al. (1990). Above the Trenches: A Complete Record of the Fighter Aces and Units of the British Empire Air Forces, 1915-1920. Fortress Publications. ISBN 0-91919-511-3 ISBN 978-0-91919-511-0
