= La Rosière =

La Rosière or Rosiere may refer to:

== Places ==
- La Rosière, Haute-Saône, a commune in Franche-Comté, France
- La Rosière, Savoie, a ski resort in Montvalezan, France
- Rosiere, Wisconsin, United States

== Other uses ==
- Walter of Rosières (died c. 1273), French knight
- La Rosiere de Pessac (1968 and 1979), two films directed by Jean Eustache
- La Rosière de Salency, a 1769 three-act comedy by Charles-Simon Favart

== See also ==
- Rosières (disambiguation)
