= Grévillers =

- Commune
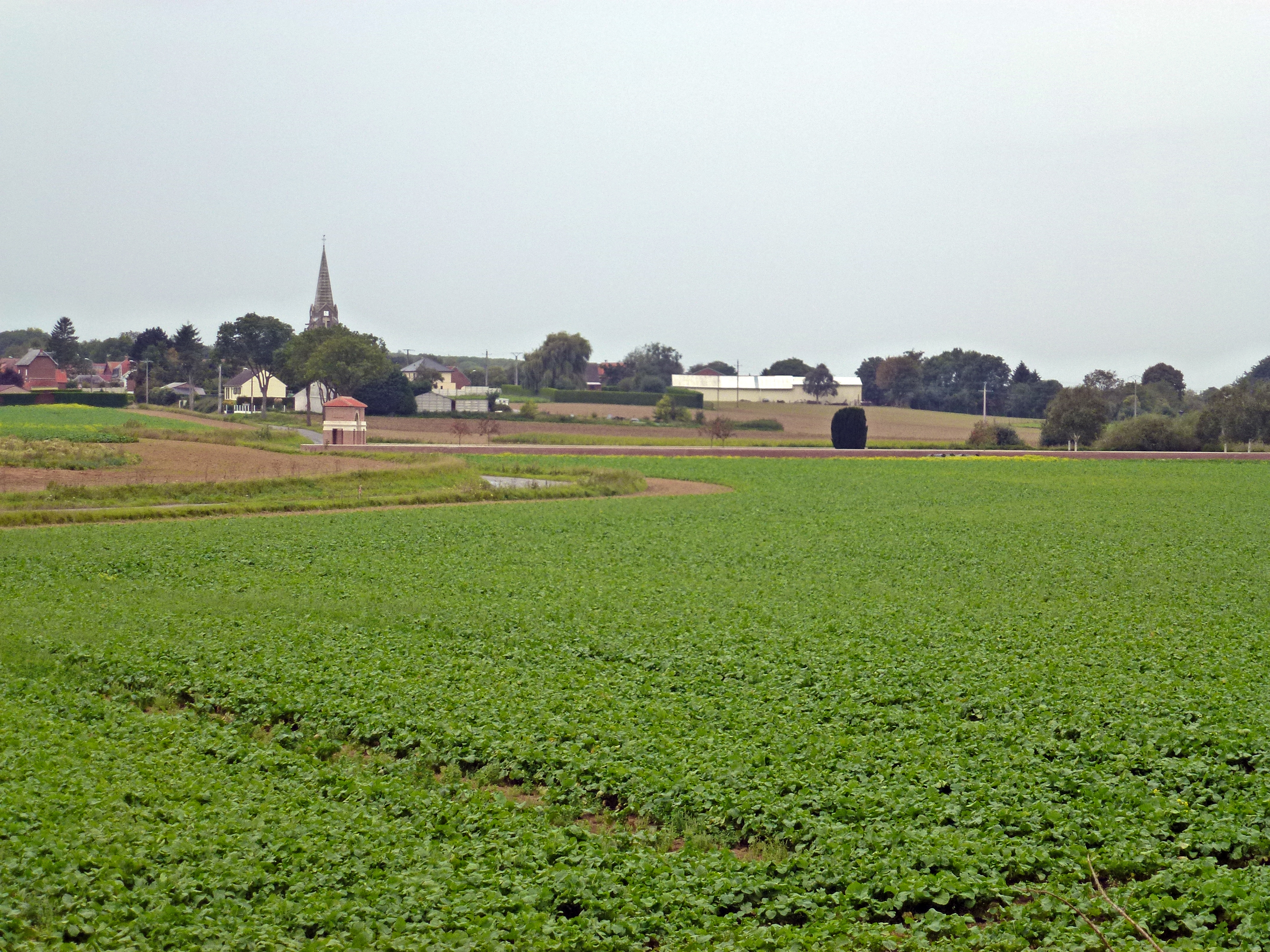
- A general view of Grévillers and the British Cemetery

- Coat of arms
- Location of Grévillers
- Location within France Location within Hauts-de-France
- Coordinates: 50°06′23″N 2°48′43″E
- Country: France
- Region: Hauts-de-France
- Department: Pas-de-Calais
- Arrondissement: Arras
- Canton: Bapaume
- Intercommunality: CC Sud-Artois

Government
  - Mayor (2020–2026): Jean-Pierre Lorent
- Area^{1}: 6.35 km^{2} (2.45 sq mi)
- Elevation: 119 m (390 ft)
- Highest elevation: 136 m (446 ft)
- Lowest elevation: 108 m (354 ft)
- Population (2023): 353
  - Density: 55.6/km^{2} (144/sq mi)
- Time zone: UTC+01:00 (CET)
  - Summer (DST): UTC+02:00 (CEST)
- INSEE/Postal code: 62387 /62450
- ^{1} French Land Register data, which excludes lakes, ponds, glaciers > 1 km^{2} (0.386 sq mi or 247 acres) and river estuaries.

Grévillers (French pronunciation: [ɡʁevile]) is a commune in the Pas-de-Calais department in the Hauts-de-France region of France. 3 kilometres (1.9 mi) west of Bapaume and 21 kilometres (13 mi) south of Arras.

== Population ==
Historical population
Year	Pop.	±% p.a.
1968	362	—
1975	331	−1.27%
1982	330	−0.04%
1990	326	−0.15%
1999	331	+0.17%
2007	368	+1.33%
2012	374	+0.32%
2017	365	−0.49%
2023	353	−0.56%
Source: INSEE

== See also ==
- Communes of the Pas-de-Calais department
