= Canton of Bapaume =

Coordinates: 50°05′54″N 2°50′16″E

Bapaume
- Canton
- Location of Bapaume within the department
- Country: France
- Region: Hauts-de-France
- Department: Pas-de-Calais
- No. of communes: {{{nbcomm}}}
- Area: 512.31 km^{2} (197.80 sq mi)
- Population (2023): 35,786
  - Density: 69.852/km^{2} (180.92/sq mi)
- INSEE code: 62 09

The Canton of Bapaume (West Flemish: Batpalmen) is a canton situated in the department of the Pas-de-Calais and in the Hauts-de-France region of northern France.

== Geography ==
The canton is organized around Bapaume in the arrondissement of Arras.

== Composition ==
At the French canton reorganisation which came into effect in March 2015, the canton was expanded from 22 to 75 communes:

- Ablainzevelle
- Achiet-le-Grand
- Achiet-le-Petit
- Avesnes-lès-Bapaume
- Ayette
- Bancourt
- Bapaume
- Baralle
- Barastre
- Beaulencourt
- Beaumetz-lès-Cambrai
- Béhagnies
- Bertincourt
- Beugnâtre
- Beugny
- Biefvillers-lès-Bapaume
- Bihucourt
- Bourlon
- Bucquoy
- Buissy
- Bullecourt
- Bus
- Chérisy
- Courcelles-le-Comte
- Croisilles
- Douchy-lès-Ayette
- Écourt-Saint-Quentin
- Écoust-Saint-Mein
- Épinoy
- Ervillers
- Favreuil
- Fontaine-lès-Croisilles
- Frémicourt
- Gomiécourt
- Graincourt-lès-Havrincourt
- Grévillers
- Hamelincourt
- Haplincourt
- Havrincourt
- Hermies
- Inchy-en-Artois
- Lagnicourt-Marcel
- Lebucquière
- Léchelle
- Ligny-Thilloy
- Marquion
- Martinpuich
- Metz-en-Couture
- Morchies
- Morval
- Mory
- Moyenneville
- Neuville-Bourjonval
- Noreuil
- Oisy-le-Verger
- Palluel
- Pronville-en-Artois
- Quéant
- Riencourt-lès-Bapaume
- Rocquigny
- Rumaucourt
- Ruyaulcourt
- Sains-lès-Marquion
- Saint-Léger
- Sapignies
- Le Sars
- Sauchy-Cauchy
- Sauchy-Lestrée
- Le Transloy
- Trescault
- Vaulx-Vraucourt
- Vélu
- Villers-au-Flos
- Warlencourt-Eaucourt
- Ytres

== Population ==
Historical population
Year	Pop.	±% p.a.
2013	36,551	—
2018	36,224	−0.18%
Source: INSEE

== See also ==
- Cantons of Pas-de-Calais
- Communes of Pas-de-Calais
- Arrondissements of the Pas-de-Calais department
