= Bourlon Wood Memorial =

Canadian war memorial

- Canada
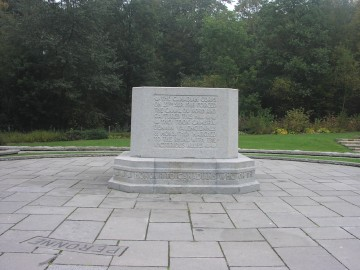
- the Canadian Bourlon Wood Memorial
- For the Canadian Corps' actions in the final months of the Great War including the crossing of the Canal du Nord, their flushing of German forces from Bourlon and Bourlon Wood and the ensuing 'Pursuit to Mons' as well as the Canadian soldiers who gave the supreme sacrifice in those actions.
- Location: 50°10′24.51″N 003°07′09.14″E near Bourlon, France
- The Canadian Corps on 27th Sep. 1918 forced the Canal du Nord and captured this hill. They took Cambrai, Denain, Valenciennes & Mons; then marched to the Rhine with the victorious Allies

The Bourlon Wood Memorial, near Bourlon, France, is a Canadian war memorial that commemorates the actions of the Canadian Corps during the final months of the First World War; a period also known as Canada's Hundred Days, part of the Hundred Days Offensive.

== Historical background ==
The memorial at the Bourlon Wood commemorates the final series of battles the Canadian Corps fought in the latter phases of the Hundred Days Offensive (also known as Canada's Hundred Days) during the final months of the Great War.

Particularly celebrated at Bourlon Wood are the Canadian victories the Battle of the Canal du Nord and the ensuing fight for the villages of Bourlon and Marquion and their flushing the German forces and Bourlon Wood, and the subsequent 'Pursuit to Mons' during which the Canadians participated in the liberation of the French cities of Cambrai, Denain (during the Battle of the Selle), Valenciennes and finally Mons in Belgium on 11 November 1918.

== Monument design ==
=== Site selection ===
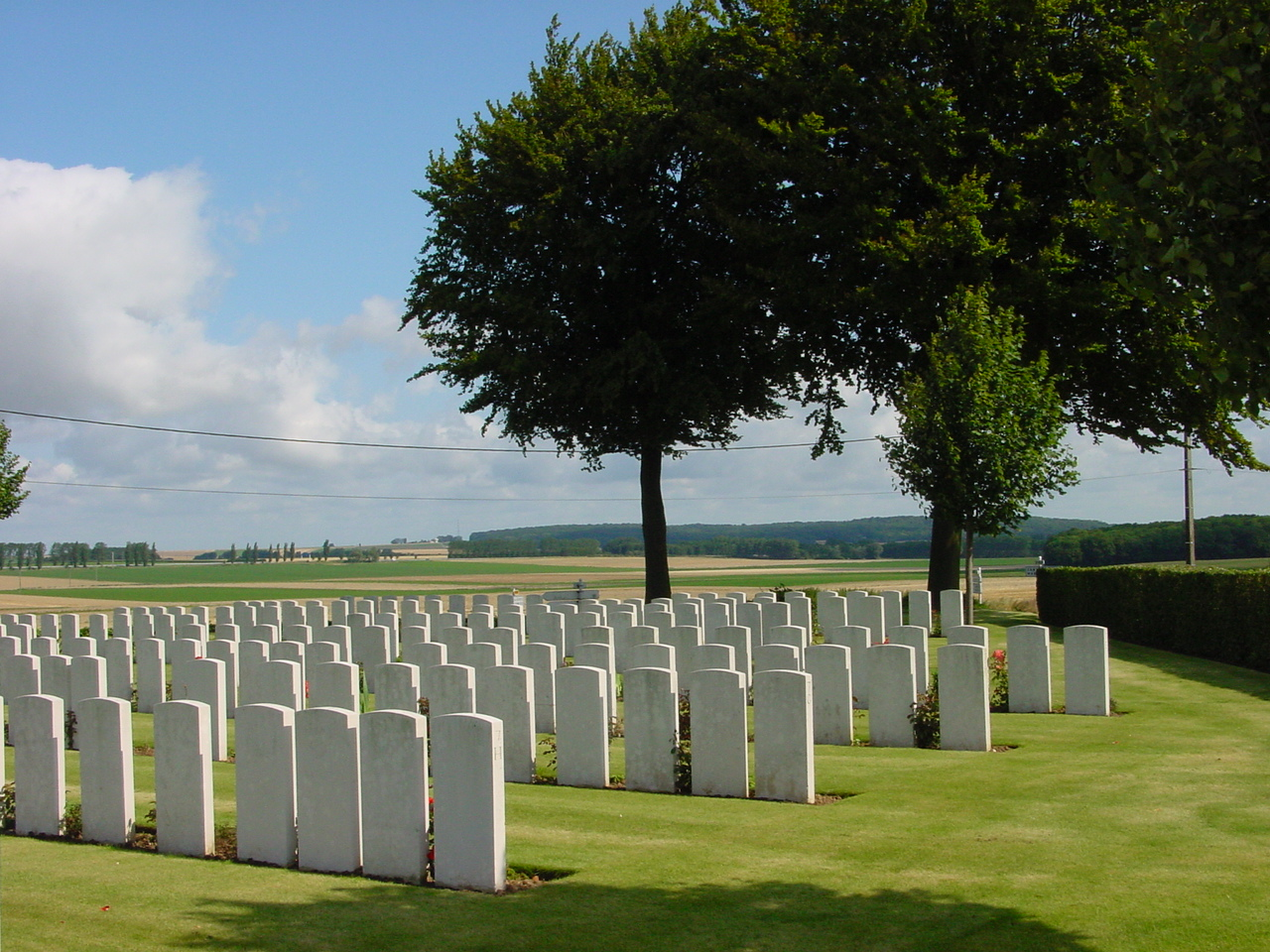
Bourlon Wood is seen in the background of Flesquières Hill British Cemetery

At the end of the war, The Imperial War Graves Commission granted Canada eight sites - five in France and three in Belgium - on which to erect memorials. Each site represented a significant Canadian engagement in the war and for this reason it was originally decided that each battlefield would be treated equally and graced with identical monuments. The Canadian Battlefields Memorials Commission was formed in November 1920 and decided a competition would be held to select the design of the memorial that would be used at the eight European sites. In October 1922, the submission of Toronto sculptor and designer Walter Seymour Allward was selected as the winner of the competition, and the submission of Frederick Chapman Clemesha placed second. The commission decided Allward's monumental design would be used at Vimy Ridge in France as it was the most dramatic location. Despite a consideration that Alward's monument at Vimy could stand alone as the sole monument to the Canadian efforts in Europe Clemesha's 'Brooding Soldier' design was selected for the remaining seven sites but was later, for a number of reasons, erected only at St. Julien in Belgium.

The remaining six memorials, to be built on sites at Passchendaele and Hill 62 in Belgium and at Le Quesnel, Dury, Courcelette and Bourlon Wood in France would each received a modest memorial designed under the supervision of architect and advisor to the Battlefield Memorials Commission, Percy Erskine Nobbs. Situated on key points of the battlefield they memorialize, the central feature of the memorials would be a 13-tonne cube-shaped block of white-grey granite quarried near Stanstead, Quebec. The blocks are essentially identical, carved with wreathes on two opposing sides and inscribed with the phrase "Honour to the Canadians who on the fields of Flanders and France fought in the cause of the Allies with sacrifice and devotion" around the base. Though uniform in design, they are differentiated in the brief English and French descriptions of the battle they commemorate inscribed on their sides and the small parks that surround the memorial blocks, which vary in shape and layout.

The Bourlon Wood Canadian Memorial it is adjacent to the town of Bourlon, about 10 km (6.2 mi) west of Cambrai, France, and was the site of a strategic German strong point in an elevated location, concealed in the forest which was obliterated in the fighting. One British soldier, who had to bivouac in the area not long after the ferocious battle, recalled, "It wasn't much like a wood, more like a lot of crooked matchsticks stuck in the ground".

=== Location and design ===
The memorial site is on land donated by the Comte de Franqueville, the Mayor of Bourlon at the war's end. It is found at the end of the 'Avenue du Bois' in the southeastern corner of the village of Bourlon.

The park is a beautiful series of terraces lined with ancient lime trees that were nursed back to health after having been shattered by shellfire during the battle for Bourlon Wood. Two parallel paths ascend from the base up to a plateau on the hilltop where the Canadian granite block monument is set in a glade of lawn upon a low circular flagstone terrace. Through the trees, the view from the top of the site looks back over the former battlefields that approached Bourlon, across which the Canadians advanced through August and September 1918, and Vimy Ridge can be seen on the northwestern horizon.

At Bourlon Wood, the inscription on the monument reads:

The Canadian Corps on 27th Sep. 1918 forced the Canal du Nord and captured this hill. They took Cambrai, Denain, Valenciennes & Mons; then marched to the Rhine with the victorious Allies

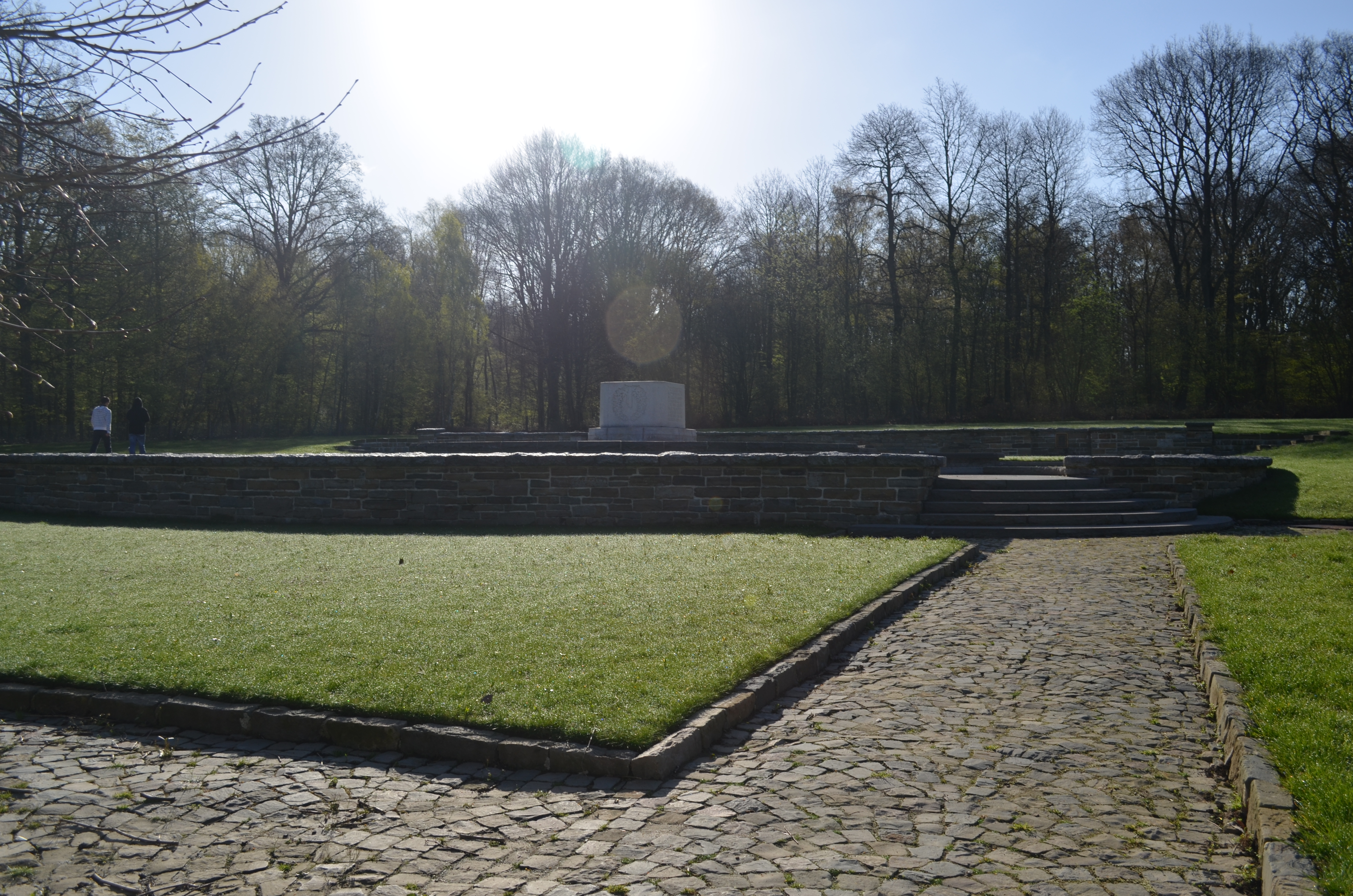
The memorial block on the summit plateau

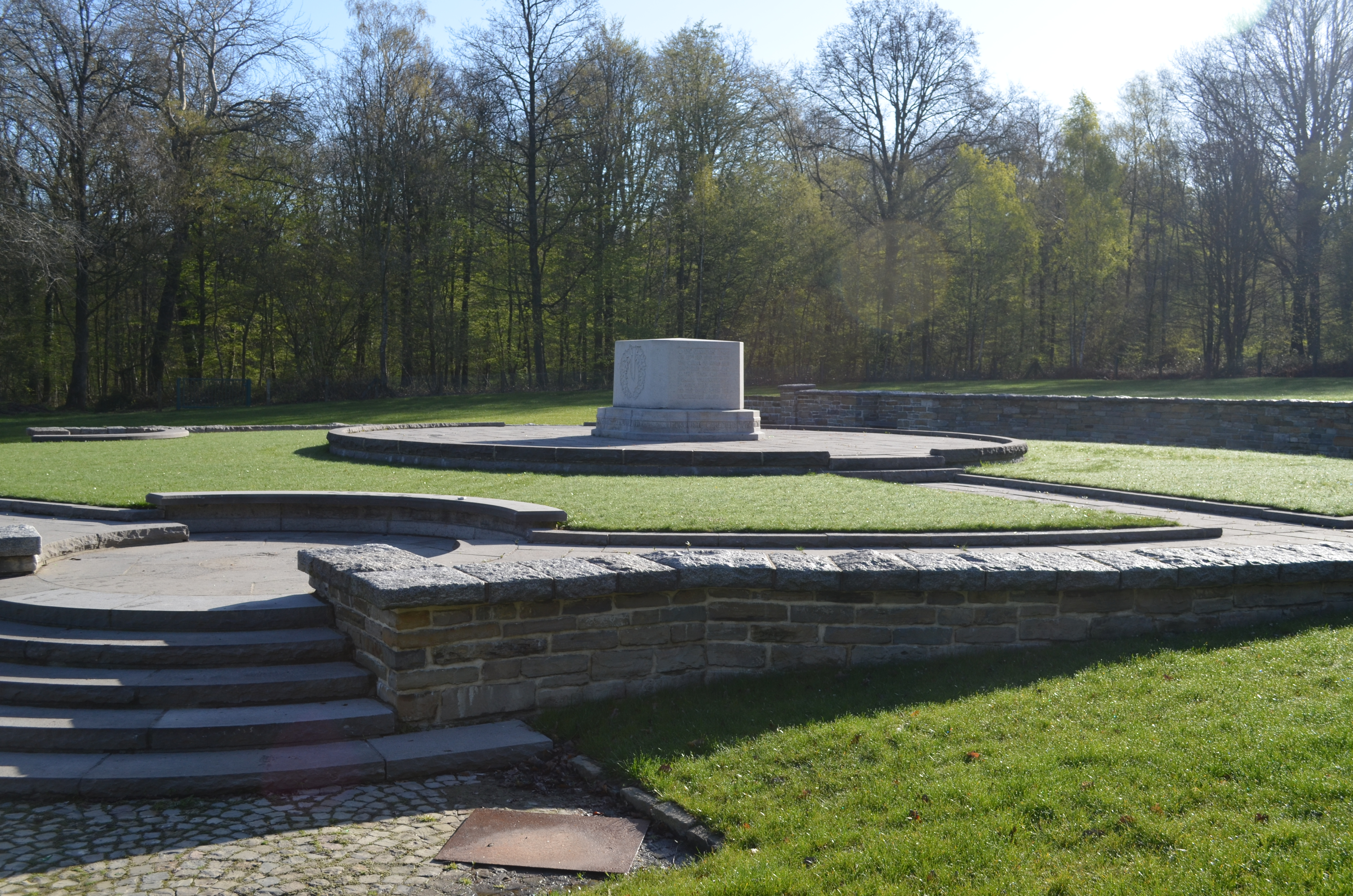
The memorial from the southwest (April 2012)

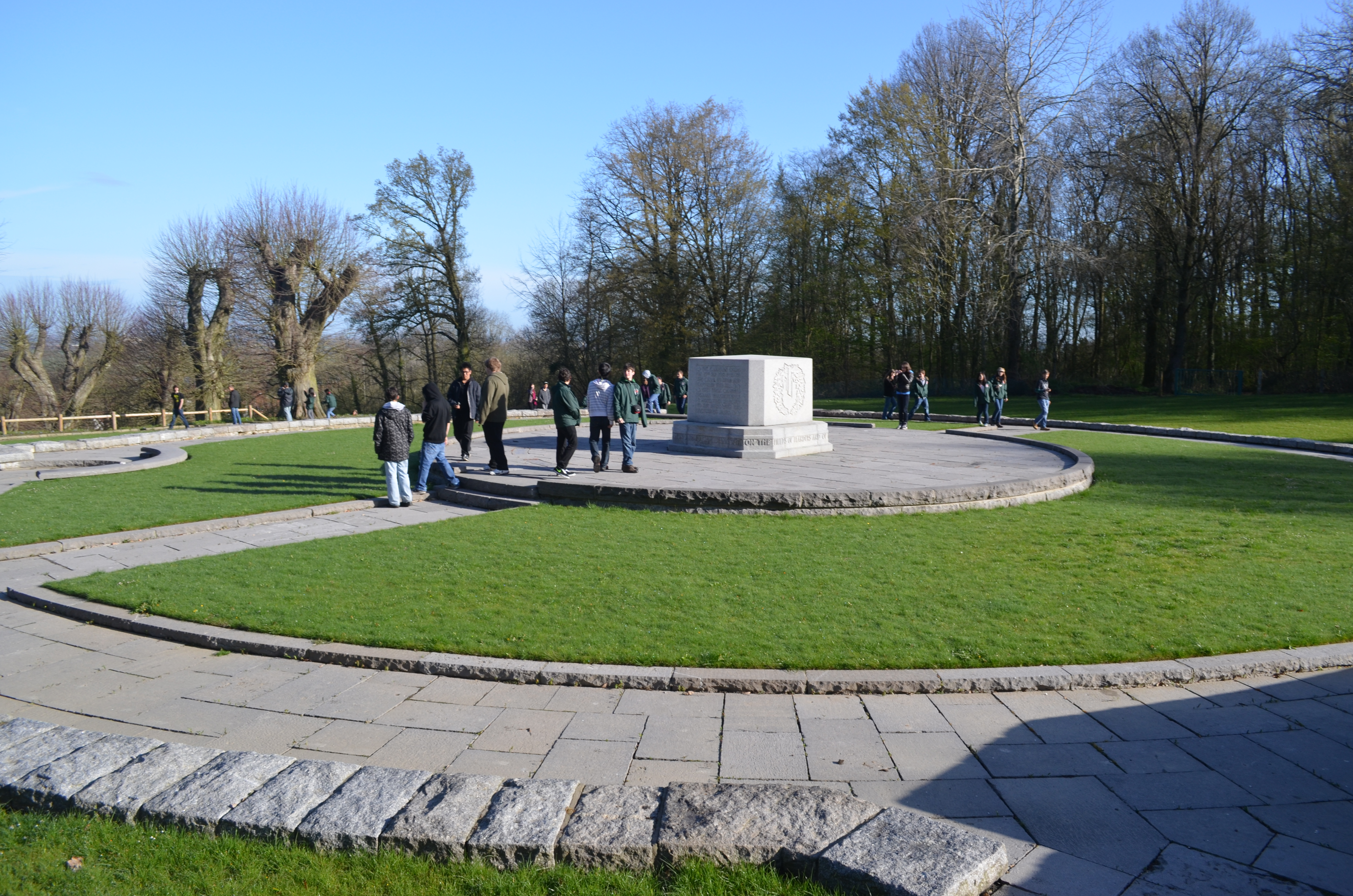
The memorial from the southeast (April 2012)
