= Rosières =

Rosières may refer:

== Places in France ==
- Rosières, Ardèche, a commune in the department of Ardèche
- Rosières, Haute-Loire, a commune in the department of Haute-Loire
- Rosières, Oise, a commune in the department of Oise
- Rosières, Tarn, a commune in the department of Tarn
- Rosières-aux-Salines, a commune in the department of Meurthe-et-Moselle
- Rosières-en-Haye, a commune in the department of Meurthe-et-Moselle
- Rosières-en-Santerre, a commune in the department of Somme
- Rosières-près-Troyes, a commune in the department of Aube
- Rosières-sur-Barbèche, a commune in the department of Doubs
- Rosières-sur-Mance, a commune in the department of Haute-Saône
- Sars-et-Rosières, a commune in the department of Nord

== Other uses ==
- Battle of Rosières, World War I
- Rosières (company), a French appliance brand owned by Candy

== See also ==
- La Rosière (disambiguation)
