= Sauchy-Lestrée =

- Commune
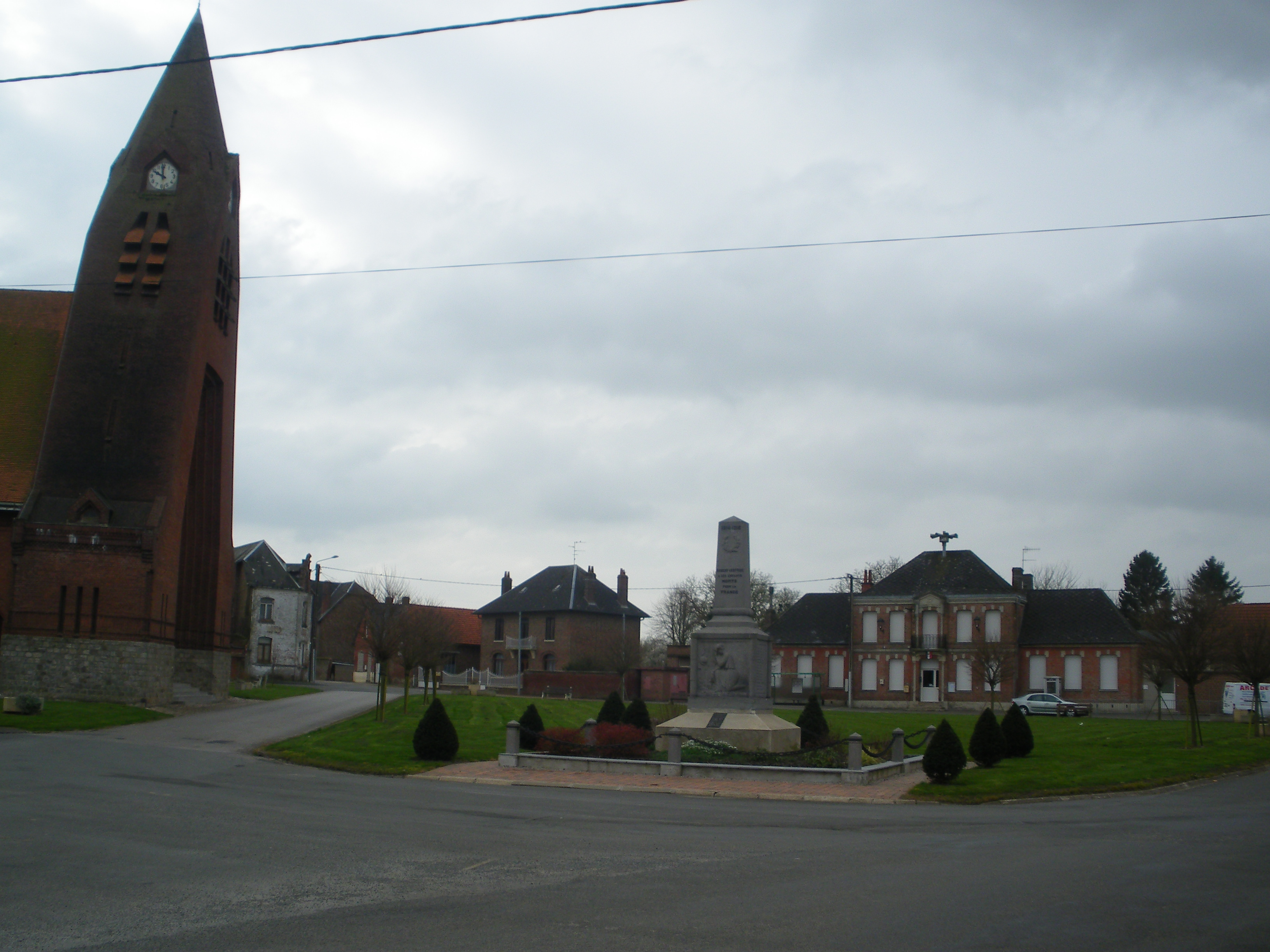
- The main square of Sauchy-Lestrée

- Coat of arms
- Location of Sauchy-Lestrée
- Location within France Location within Hauts-de-France
- Coordinates: 50°13′40″N 3°06′15″E
- Country: France
- Region: Hauts-de-France
- Department: Pas-de-Calais
- Arrondissement: Arras
- Canton: Bapaume
- Intercommunality: CC Osartis Marquion

Government
  - Mayor (2020–2026): Francis Rigaut
- Area^{1}: 9.06 km^{2} (3.50 sq mi)
- Elevation: 47 m (154 ft)
- Highest elevation: 77 m (253 ft)
- Lowest elevation: 41 m (135 ft)
- Population (2023): 438
  - Density: 48.3/km^{2} (125/sq mi)
- Time zone: UTC+01:00 (CET)
  - Summer (DST): UTC+02:00 (CEST)
- INSEE/Postal code: 62781 /62860
- ^{1} French Land Register data, which excludes lakes, ponds, glaciers > 1 km^{2} (0.386 sq mi or 247 acres) and river estuaries.

Sauchy-Lestrée is a commune in the Pas-de-Calais department in the Hauts-de-France region of France.

== Geography ==
Sauchy-Lestrée lies 19 miles (31 km) southeast of Arras, at the junction of the D21E and D15 roads.

== Population ==
Historical population
Year	Pop.	±% p.a.
1968	588	—
1975	617	+0.69%
1982	543	−1.81%
1990	458	−2.11%
1999	446	−0.29%
2007	452	+0.17%
2012	445	−0.31%
2017	455	+0.45%
2023	438	−0.63%
Source: INSEE

== Places of interest ==
- The church of St Ambert, rebuilt, as was much of the village, after World War I.
- The Commonwealth War Graves Commission cemetery.

== See also ==
- Communes of the Pas-de-Calais department
