= Sauchy-Cauchy =

- Commune
- The church of Sauchy-Cauchy

- Coat of arms
- Location of Sauchy-Cauchy
- Location within France Location within Hauts-de-France
- Coordinates: 50°14′10″N 3°05′55″E
- Country: France
- Region: Hauts-de-France
- Department: Pas-de-Calais
- Arrondissement: Arras
- Canton: Bapaume
- Intercommunality: CC Osartis Marquion

Government
  - Mayor (2020–2026): Jean-Charles Dupas
- Area^{1}: 4.08 km^{2} (1.58 sq mi)
- Elevation: 43 m (141 ft)
- Highest elevation: 65 m (213 ft)
- Lowest elevation: 36 m (118 ft)
- Population (2023): 390
  - Density: 96/km^{2} (250/sq mi)
- Time zone: UTC+01:00 (CET)
  - Summer (DST): UTC+02:00 (CEST)
- INSEE/Postal code: 62780 /62860
- ^{1} French Land Register data, which excludes lakes, ponds, glaciers > 1 km^{2} (0.386 sq mi or 247 acres) and river estuaries.

Sauchy-Cauchy (French pronunciation: [soʃi koʃi]) is a commune in the Pas-de-Calais department in the Hauts-de-France region of France about 19 miles (31 km) southeast of Arras.

== Population ==
Historical population
Year	Pop.	±% p.a.
1968	365	—
1975	340	−1.01%
1982	374	+1.37%
1990	386	+0.40%
1999	411	+0.70%
2007	399	−0.37%
2012	378	−1.08%
2017	364	−0.75%
2023	390	+1.16%
Source: INSEE

== See also ==
- Communes of the Pas-de-Calais department
