= Rumaucourt =

- Commune
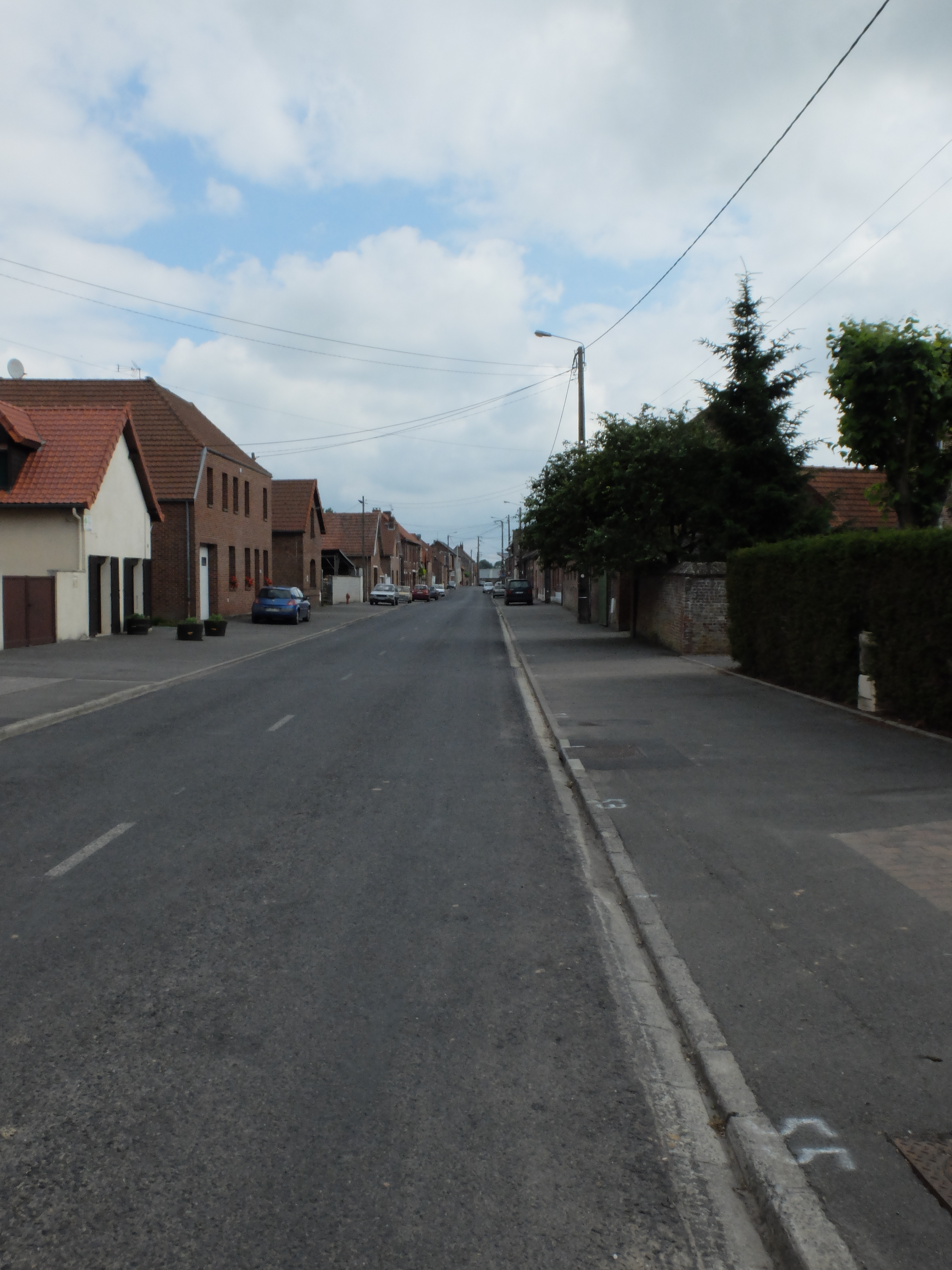
- A road of Rumaucourt

- Coat of arms
- Location of Rumaucourt
- Location within France Location within Hauts-de-France
- Coordinates: 50°14′35″N 3°03′37″E
- Country: France
- Region: Hauts-de-France
- Department: Pas-de-Calais
- Arrondissement: Arras
- Canton: Bapaume
- Intercommunality: CC Osartis Marquion

Government
  - Mayor (2020–2026): Didier Drubay
- Area^{1}: 5.51 km^{2} (2.13 sq mi)
- Elevation: 41 m (135 ft)
- Highest elevation: 60 m (200 ft)
- Lowest elevation: 35 m (115 ft)
- Population (2023): 691
  - Density: 125/km^{2} (325/sq mi)
- Time zone: UTC+01:00 (CET)
  - Summer (DST): UTC+02:00 (CEST)
- INSEE/Postal code: 62728 /62860
- ^{1} French Land Register data, which excludes lakes, ponds, glaciers > 1 km^{2} (0.386 sq mi or 247 acres) and river estuaries.

Rumaucourt (French pronunciation: [ʁymokuʁ]) is a commune in the Pas-de-Calais department in the Hauts-de-France region of France about 12 miles (19 km) southeast of Arras.

== Population ==
The inhabitants are called Rumaucourtois in French.

Historical population
Year	Pop.	±% p.a.
1968	653	—
1975	695	+0.89%
1982	676	−0.40%
1990	691	+0.27%
1999	724	+0.52%
2007	700	−0.42%
2012	693	−0.20%
2017	685	−0.23%
2023	691	+0.15%
Source: INSEE

== See also ==
- Communes of the Pas-de-Calais department
