= Épinoy =

- Commune
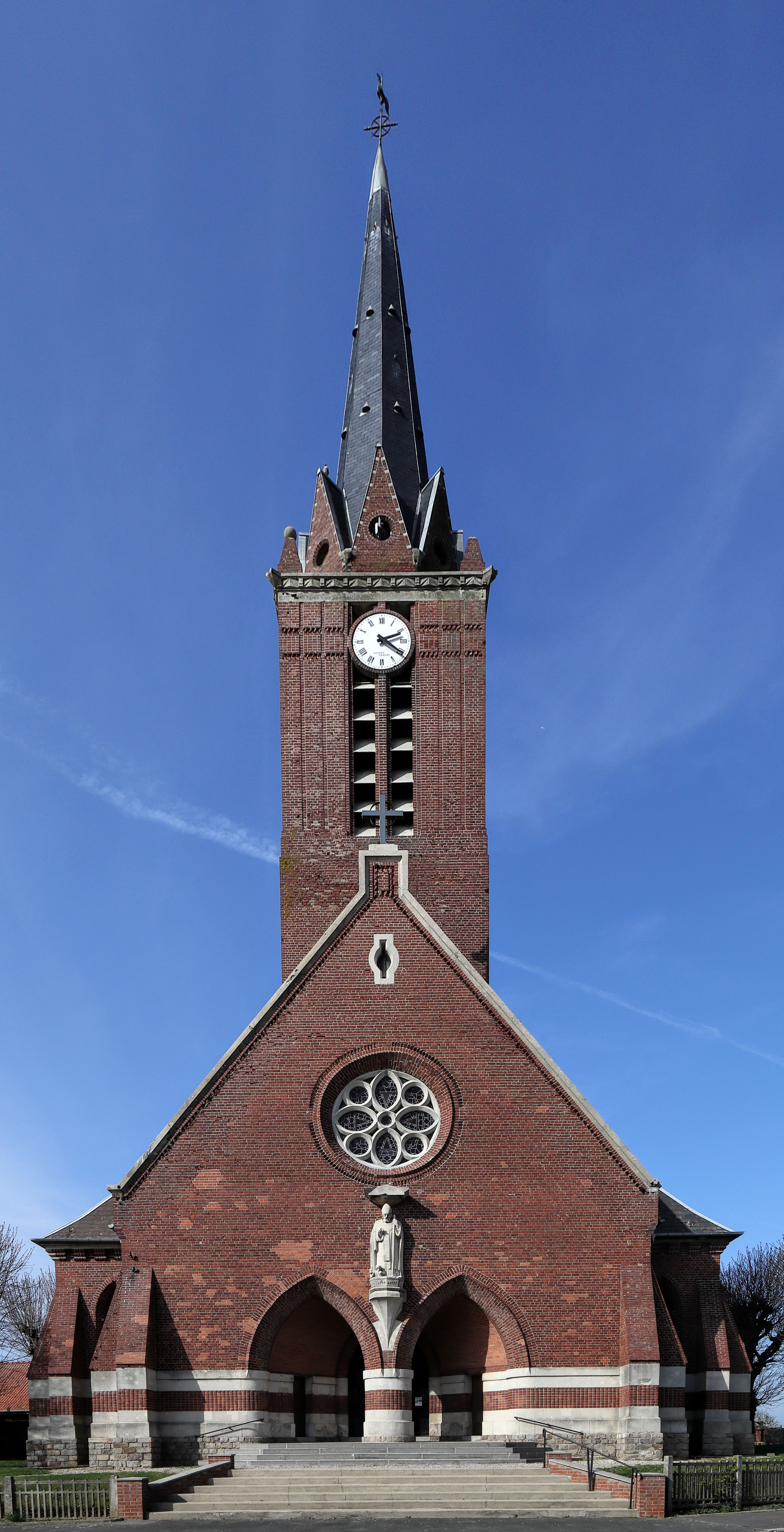
- The church of Épinoy

- Coat of arms
- Location of Épinoy
- Location within France Location within Hauts-de-France
- Coordinates: 50°13′50″N 3°09′48″E
- Country: France
- Region: Hauts-de-France
- Department: Pas-de-Calais
- Arrondissement: Arras
- Canton: Bapaume
- Intercommunality: CC Osartis Marquion

Government
  - Mayor (2020–2026): Corinne Delevaque
- Area^{1}: 8.08 km^{2} (3.12 sq mi)
- Elevation: 76 m (249 ft)
- Highest elevation: 79 m (259 ft)
- Lowest elevation: 45 m (148 ft)
- Population (2023): 491
  - Density: 60.8/km^{2} (157/sq mi)
- Time zone: UTC+01:00 (CET)
  - Summer (DST): UTC+02:00 (CEST)
- INSEE/Postal code: 62298 /62860
- ^{1} French Land Register data, which excludes lakes, ponds, glaciers > 1 km^{2} (0.386 sq mi or 247 acres) and river estuaries.

Épinoy (French pronunciation: [epinwa]; Picard: Spineu) is a commune in the Pas-de-Calais department in the Hauts-de-France region of France 19 miles (31 km) southeast of Arras.

== Population ==
Historical population
Year	Pop.	±% p.a.
1968	452	—
1975	466	+0.44%
1982	444	−0.69%
1990	463	+0.53%
1999	498	+0.81%
2007	517	+0.47%
2012	544	+1.02%
2017	546	+0.07%
2023	491	−1.75%
Source: INSEE

== See also ==
- Communes of the Pas-de-Calais department
