= Achiet-le-Petit =

- Commune
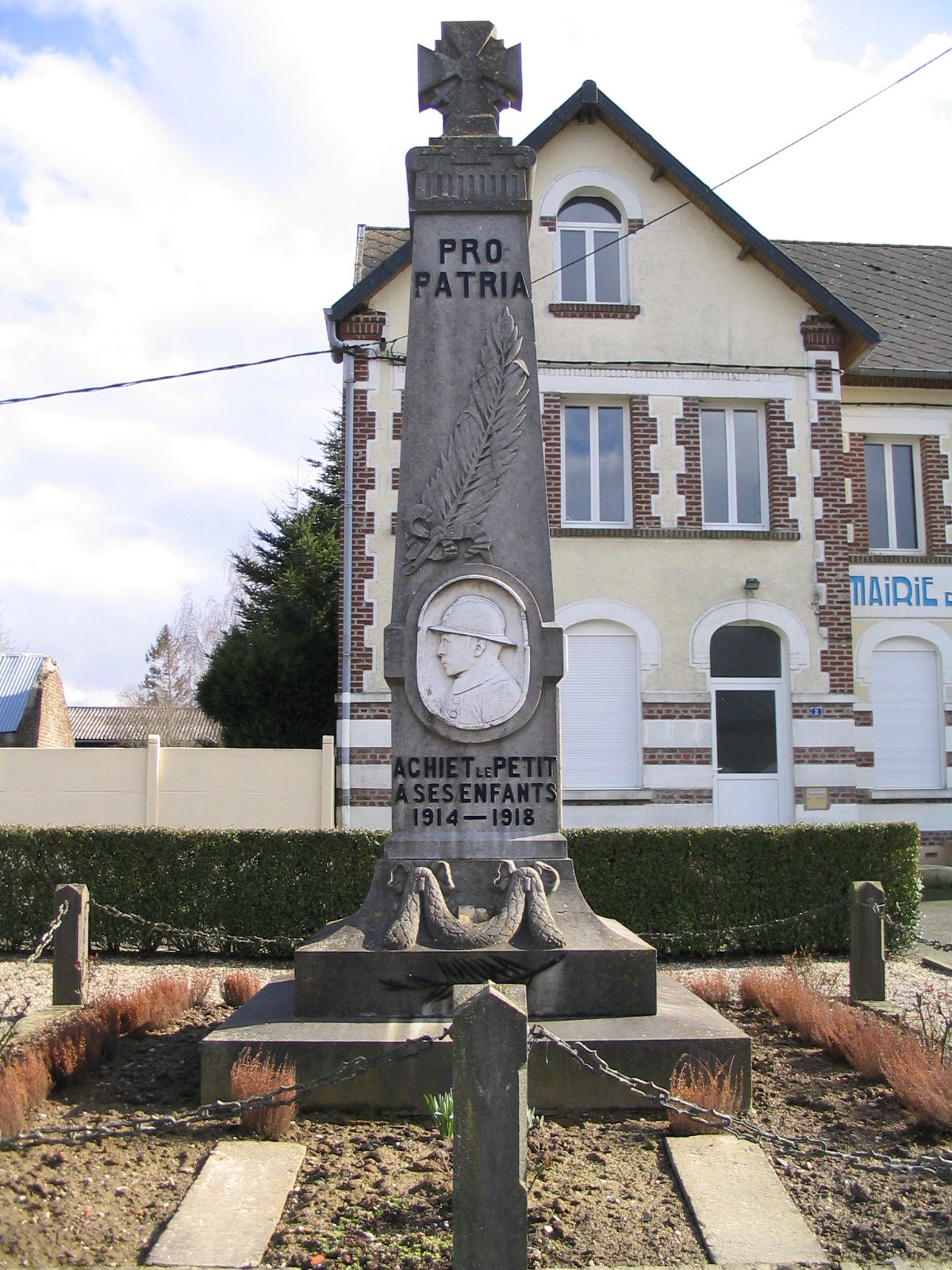
- The monument to the dead, in front of the town hall

- Coat of arms
- Location of Achiet-le-Petit
- Location within France Location within Hauts-de-France
- Coordinates: 50°07′28″N 2°45′07″E
- Country: France
- Region: Hauts-de-France
- Department: Pas-de-Calais
- Arrondissement: Arras
- Canton: Bapaume
- Intercommunality: Sud-Artois

Government
  - Mayor (2020–2026): Philippe Lesage
- Area^{1}: 7.25 km^{2} (2.80 sq mi)
- Elevation: 123 m (404 ft)
- Highest elevation: 139 m (456 ft)
- Lowest elevation: 97 m (318 ft)
- Population (2023): 320
  - Density: 44/km^{2} (110/sq mi)
- Time zone: UTC+01:00 (CET)
  - Summer (DST): UTC+02:00 (CEST)
- INSEE/Postal code: 62006 /62121
- ^{1} French Land Register data, which excludes lakes, ponds, glaciers > 1 km^{2} (0.386 sq mi or 247 acres) and river estuaries.

Achiet-le-Petit (French pronunciation: [aʃjɛ lə pəti]) is a commune in the Pas-de-Calais department in northern France.

== Geography ==
A farming village located 13 miles (21 km) south of Arras, at the D27 and D9 road junction.

== History ==
- In 1700, Charles Jacques Adrien de Mullet, seigneur of Wancquetin demolished the remains of the small castle, knocking down the motte and filling in most of the moat. He then built a chateau, using white bricks and stones, enclosed by large garden walls.
- In 1749 the castle was completed by the laying out of a wide terrace (500' long by 40' wide) on which there were two guns donated by Louis XV. During the French Revolution, the cannons were melted down and thrown down a well. In the 19th century, they were found and returned to the Diesbach family.
- In 1789, the castle was looted and destroyed during the Revolution, leaving no trace of the edifice. The stones and bricks of the castle were used by the locals to construct homes which were in turn destroyed during World War I.
- In the 19th century, the land stolen and sold during the French Revolution was restored to the Diesbach family.
- The commune was involved in the theatre of operations of the Battle of Bapaume (1871), during the Franco-Prussian War.
- After World War I, the town was awarded the Croix de Guerre.

== Population ==
Historical population
Year	Pop.	±% p.a.
1968	358	—
1975	358	+0.00%
1982	355	−0.12%
1990	348	−0.25%
1999	328	−0.66%
2007	326	−0.08%
2012	330	+0.24%
2017	303	−1.69%
2023	320	+0.91%
Source: INSEE

== Sights ==
- The church of St.Martin, dating from the twentieth century.

== See also ==
Communes of the Pas-de-Calais department
