= Palluel =

- Commune
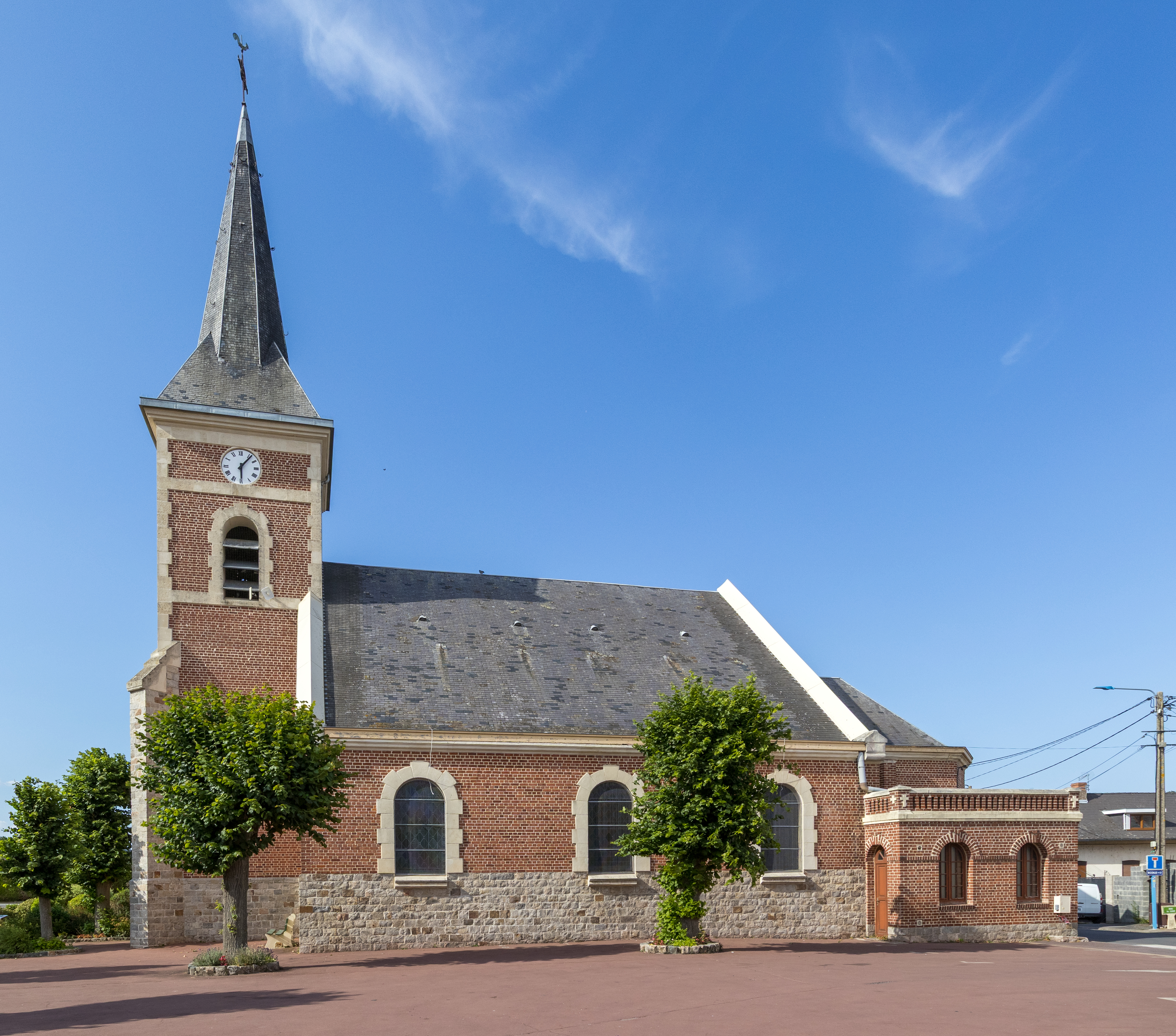
- The church of Palluel

- Coat of arms
- Location of Palluel
- Location within France Location within Hauts-de-France
- Coordinates: 50°16′05″N 3°05′57″E
- Country: France
- Region: Hauts-de-France
- Department: Pas-de-Calais
- Arrondissement: Arras
- Canton: Bapaume
- Intercommunality: CC Osartis Marquion

Government
  - Mayor (2022–2026): Thierry Gilleron
- Area^{1}: 2.77 km^{2} (1.07 sq mi)
- Highest elevation: 60 m (200 ft)
- Lowest elevation: 34 m (112 ft)
- Population (2023): 566
  - Density: 204/km^{2} (529/sq mi)
- Time zone: UTC+01:00 (CET)
  - Summer (DST): UTC+02:00 (CEST)
- INSEE/Postal code: 62646 /62860
- ^{1} French Land Register data, which excludes lakes, ponds, glaciers > 1 km^{2} (0.386 sq mi or 247 acres) and river estuaries.

Palluel (French pronunciation: [palɥɛl]) is a commune in the Pas-de-Calais department in the Hauts-de-France region of France 19 miles (31 km) east of Arras, in the valley of the river Sensée.

== 1967 tornado ==
On 24 June 1967 a narrow F5 tornado killed six and injuring 30 others. 17 homes were completely destroyed, vehicles were picked up and thrown over homes and trees were severely damaged. It reached 250 meters wide and traveled 23 km. This was the most intense tornado to hit France since the 1845 Montville tornado.

== Population ==
Historical population
Year	Pop.	±% p.a.
1968	508	—
1975	522	+0.39%
1982	565	+1.14%
1990	525	−0.91%
1999	520	−0.11%
2007	564	+1.02%
2012	547	−0.61%
2017	563	+0.58%
2023	566	+0.09%
Source: INSEE

== See also ==
- Communes of the Pas-de-Calais department
