= Sains-lès-Marquion =

- Commune
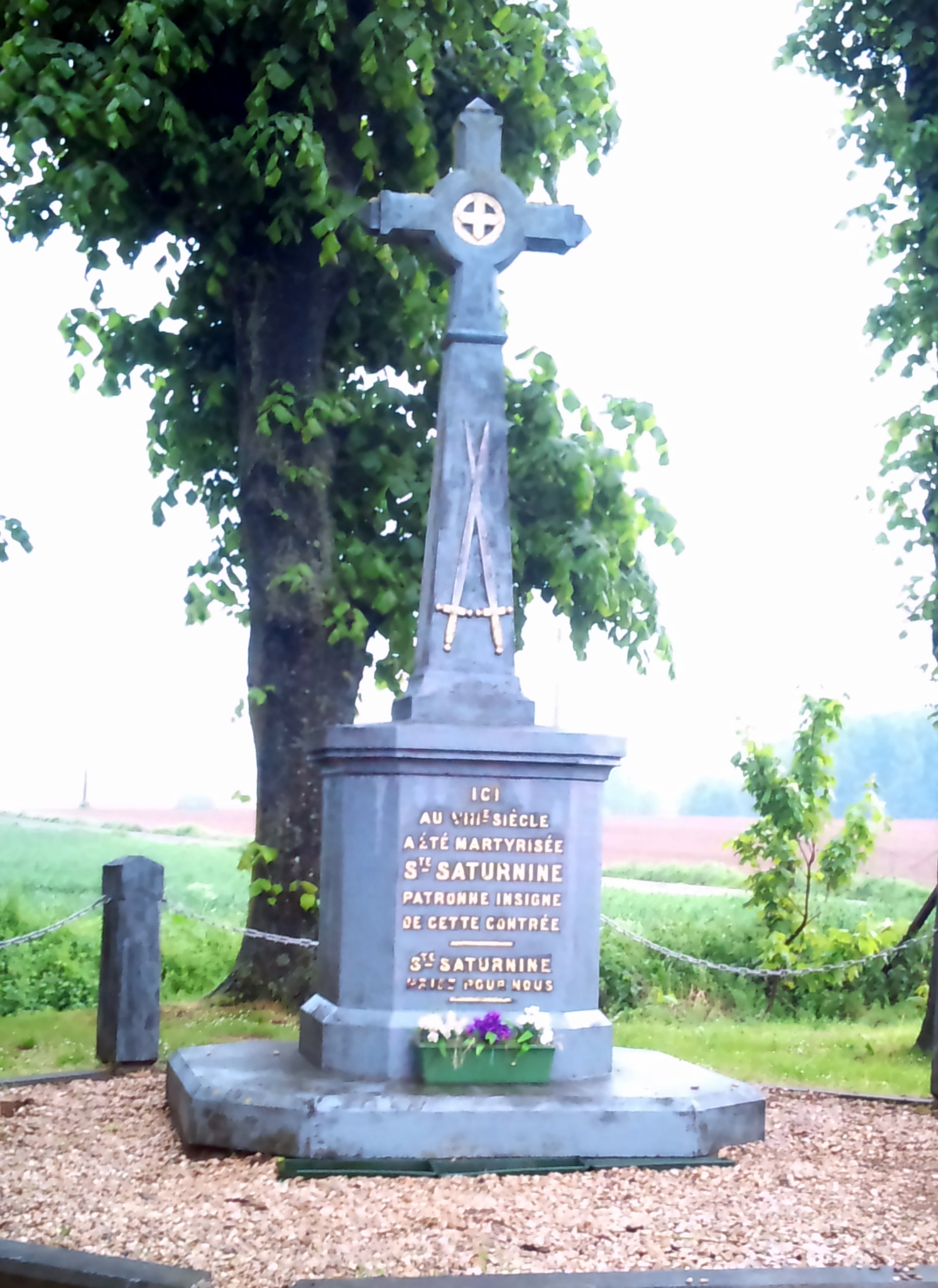
- The commemorative stele to Sainte-Saturnine

- Coat of arms
- Location of Sains-lès-Marquion
- Location within France Location within Hauts-de-France
- Coordinates: 50°11′41″N 3°04′25″E
- Country: France
- Region: Hauts-de-France
- Department: Pas-de-Calais
- Arrondissement: Arras
- Canton: Bapaume
- Intercommunality: CC Osartis Marquion

Government
  - Mayor (2020–2026): Guy de Saint-Aubert
- Area^{1}: 6.26 km^{2} (2.42 sq mi)
- Elevation: 48 m (157 ft)
- Highest elevation: 88 m (289 ft)
- Lowest elevation: 46 m (151 ft)
- Population (2023): 310
  - Density: 50/km^{2} (130/sq mi)
- Time zone: UTC+01:00 (CET)
  - Summer (DST): UTC+02:00 (CEST)
- INSEE/Postal code: 62739 /62860
- ^{1} French Land Register data, which excludes lakes, ponds, glaciers > 1 km^{2} (0.386 sq mi or 247 acres) and river estuaries.

Sains-lès-Marquion is a commune in the Pas-de-Calais department in the Hauts-de-France region of France about 19 miles (31 km) southeast of Arras.

== Population ==
Historical population
Year	Pop.	±% p.a.
1968	351	—
1975	324	−1.14%
1982	315	−0.40%
1990	276	−1.64%
1999	300	+0.93%
2007	333	+1.31%
2012	327	−0.36%
2017	322	−0.31%
2023	310	−0.63%
Source: INSEE

== See also ==
- Communes of the Pas-de-Calais department
