= Oisy-le-Verger =

- Commune
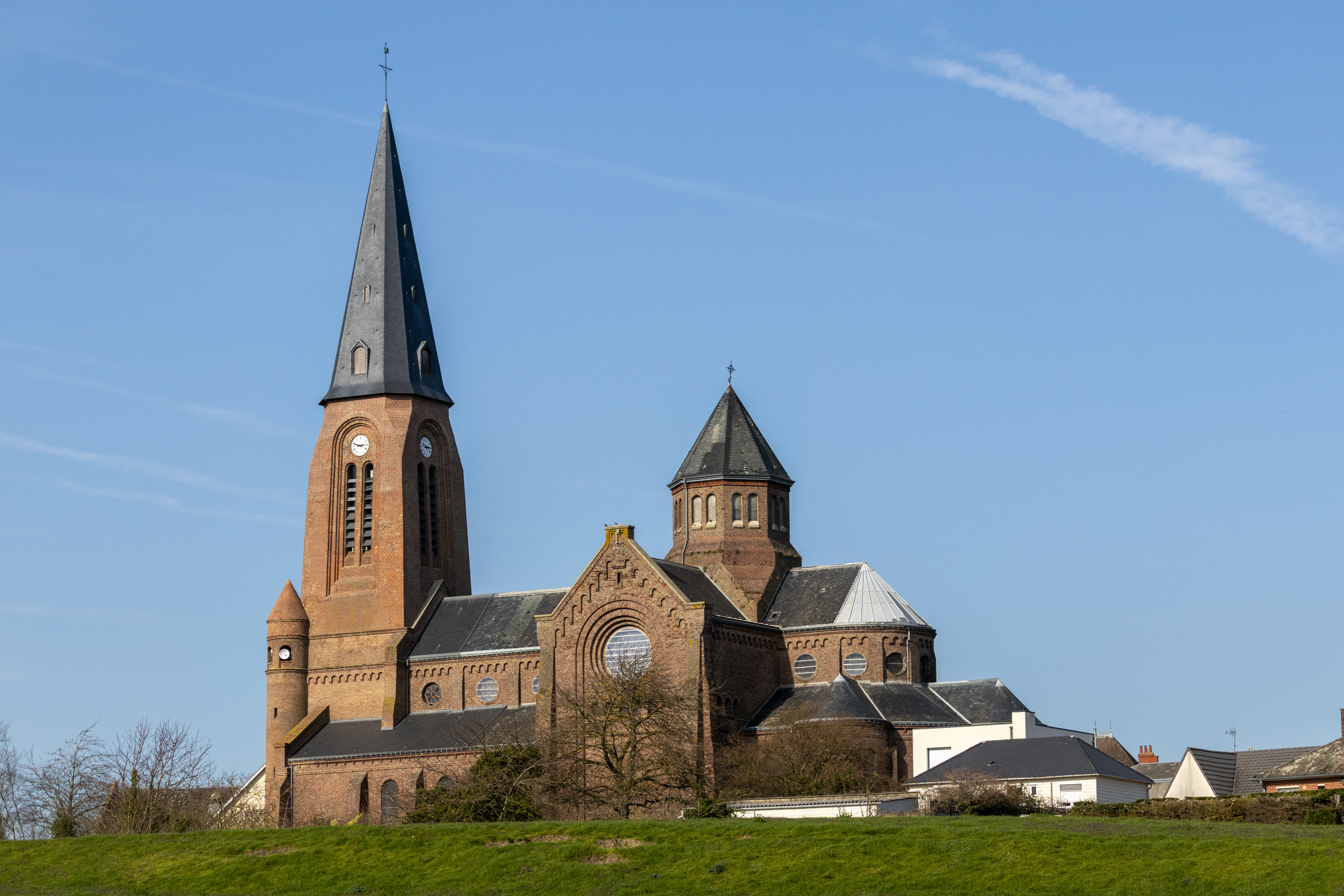
- The church of Oisy-le-Verger

- Coat of arms
- Location of Oisy-le-Verger
- Location within France Location within Hauts-de-France
- Coordinates: 50°15′03″N 3°07′29″E
- Country: France
- Region: Hauts-de-France
- Department: Pas-de-Calais
- Arrondissement: Arras
- Canton: Bapaume
- Intercommunality: CC Osartis Marquion

Government
  - Mayor (2020–2026): Marie-Christine Guenot
- Area^{1}: 11.36 km^{2} (4.39 sq mi)
- Elevation: 78 m (256 ft)
- Highest elevation: 77 m (253 ft)
- Lowest elevation: 32 m (105 ft)
- Population (2023): 1,213
  - Density: 106.8/km^{2} (276.6/sq mi)
- Time zone: UTC+01:00 (CET)
  - Summer (DST): UTC+02:00 (CEST)
- INSEE/Postal code: 62638 /62860
- ^{1} French Land Register data, which excludes lakes, ponds, glaciers > 1 km^{2} (0.386 sq mi or 247 acres) and river estuaries.

Oisy-le-Verger (French pronunciation: [wazˈi lə vɛʁʒˈeː]) is a commune in the Pas-de-Calais department in the Hauts-de-France region of France 15 miles (24 km) east of Arras.

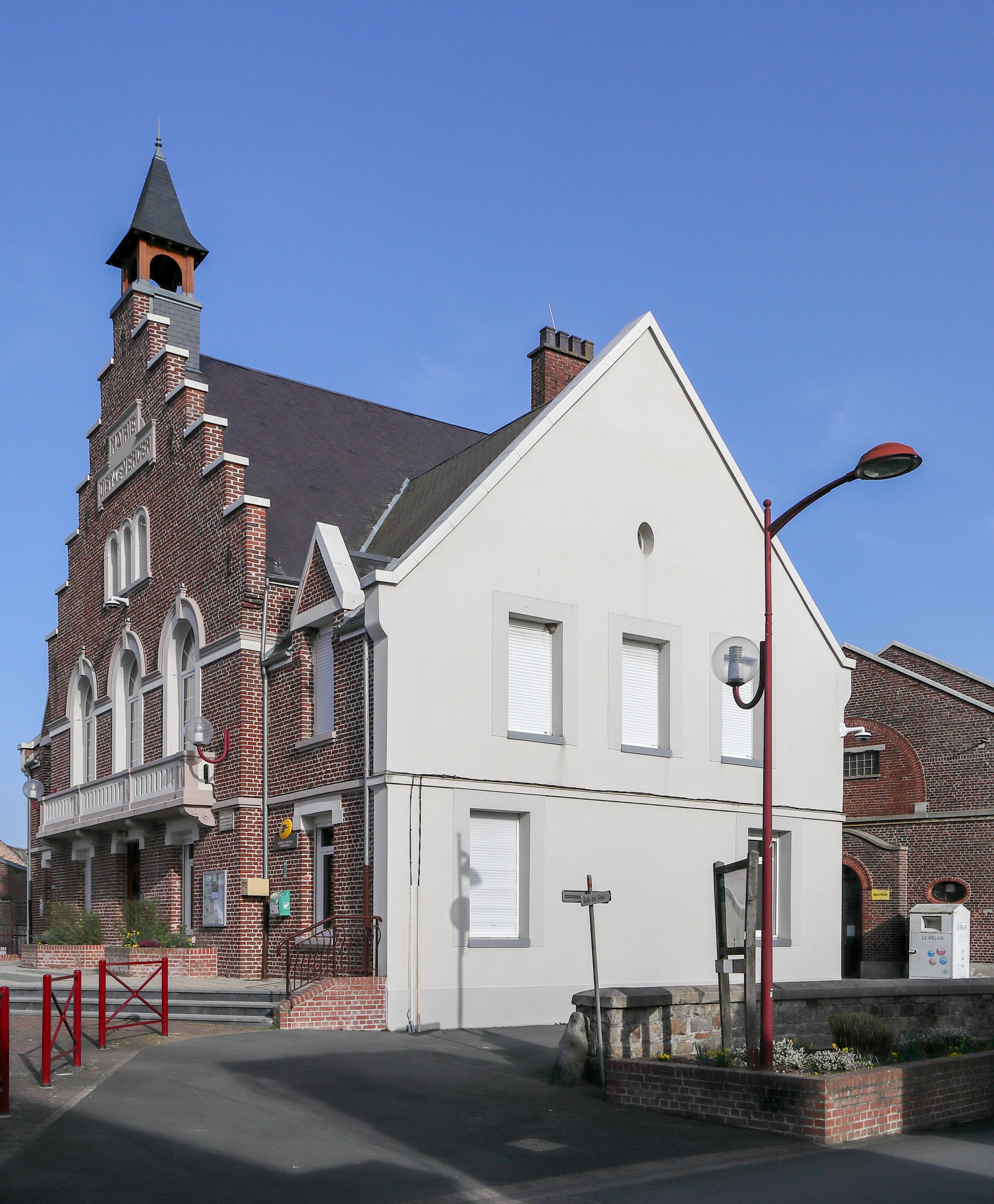
The town hall

== Population ==
Historical population
Year	Pop.	±% p.a.
1968	1,328	—
1975	1,310	−0.19%
1982	1,278	−0.35%
1990	1,301	+0.22%
1999	1,260	−0.36%
2007	1,285	+0.25%
2012	1,251	−0.53%
2017	1,217	−0.55%
2023	1,213	−0.05%
Source: INSEE

== See also ==
- Communes of the Pas-de-Calais department
