= Écourt-Saint-Quentin =

- Commune
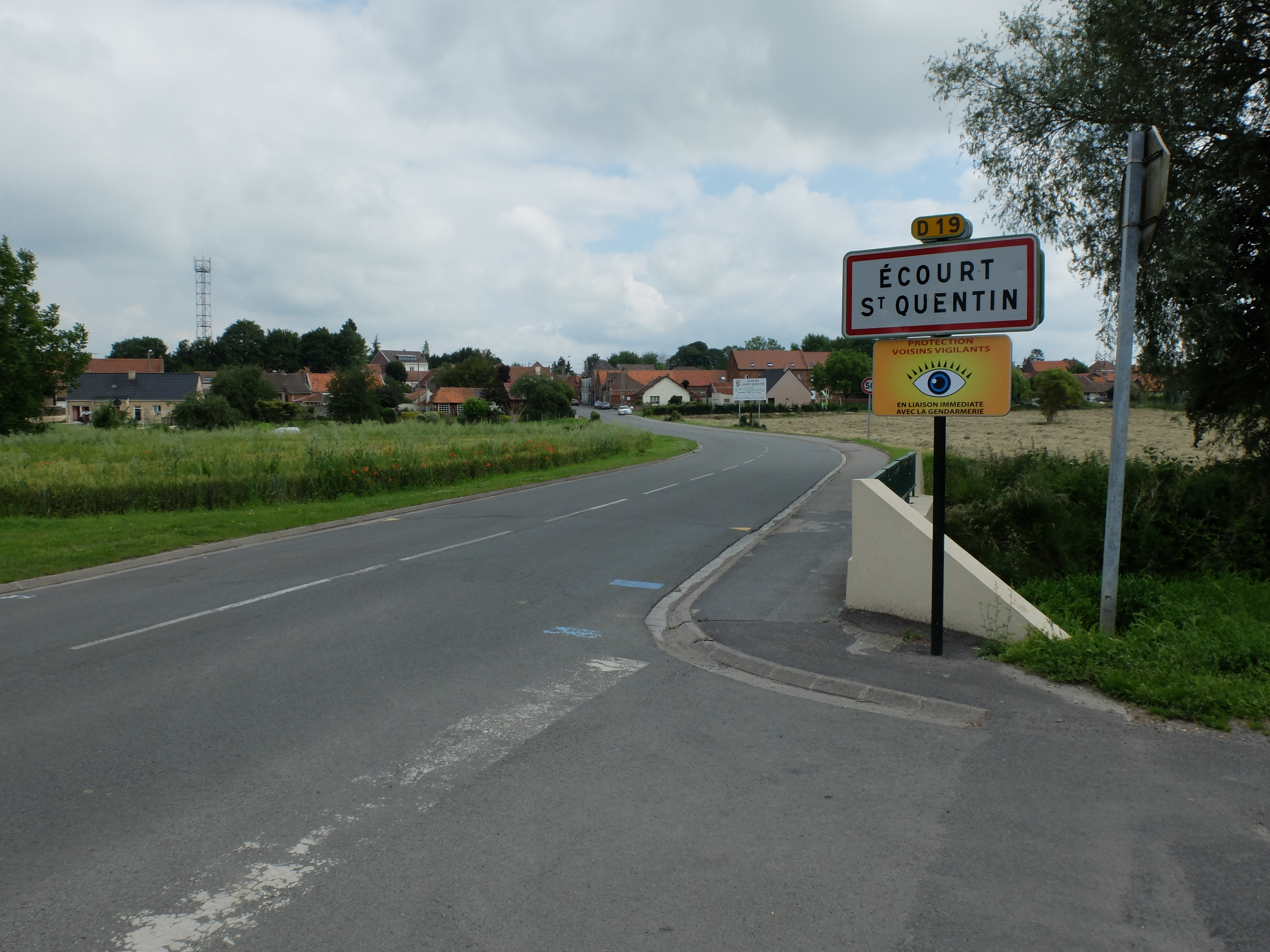
- The road into Écourt-Saint-Quentin

- Coat of arms
- Location of Écourt-Saint-Quentin
- Location within France Location within Hauts-de-France
- Coordinates: 50°15′04″N 3°04′19″E
- Country: France
- Region: Hauts-de-France
- Department: Pas-de-Calais
- Arrondissement: Arras
- Canton: Bapaume
- Intercommunality: CC Osartis Marquion

Government
  - Mayor (2020–2026): Stéphane Tonelle
- Area^{1}: 9.49 km^{2} (3.66 sq mi)
- Elevation: 74 m (243 ft)
- Highest elevation: 73 m (240 ft)
- Lowest elevation: 35 m (115 ft)
- Population (2023): 1,706
  - Density: 180/km^{2} (466/sq mi)
- Time zone: UTC+01:00 (CET)
  - Summer (DST): UTC+02:00 (CEST)
- INSEE/Postal code: 62284 /62860
- ^{1} French Land Register data, which excludes lakes, ponds, glaciers > 1 km^{2} (0.386 sq mi or 247 acres) and river estuaries.

Écourt-Saint-Quentin (French pronunciation: [ekuʁ sɛ̃ kɑ̃tɛ̃]; Picard: Aicort-Saint-Kintin) is a commune in the Pas-de-Calais department in the Hauts-de-France region of France 19 miles (31 km) southeast of Arras.

== Population ==
Historical population
Year	Pop.	±% p.a.
1968	1,527	—
1975	1,510	−0.16%
1982	1,657	+1.34%
1990	1,771	+0.84%
1999	1,731	−0.25%
2007	1,742	+0.08%
2012	1,733	−0.10%
2017	1,672	−0.71%
2023	1,706	+0.34%
Source: INSEE

== See also ==
- Communes of the Pas-de-Calais department
