= Buissy =

- Commune
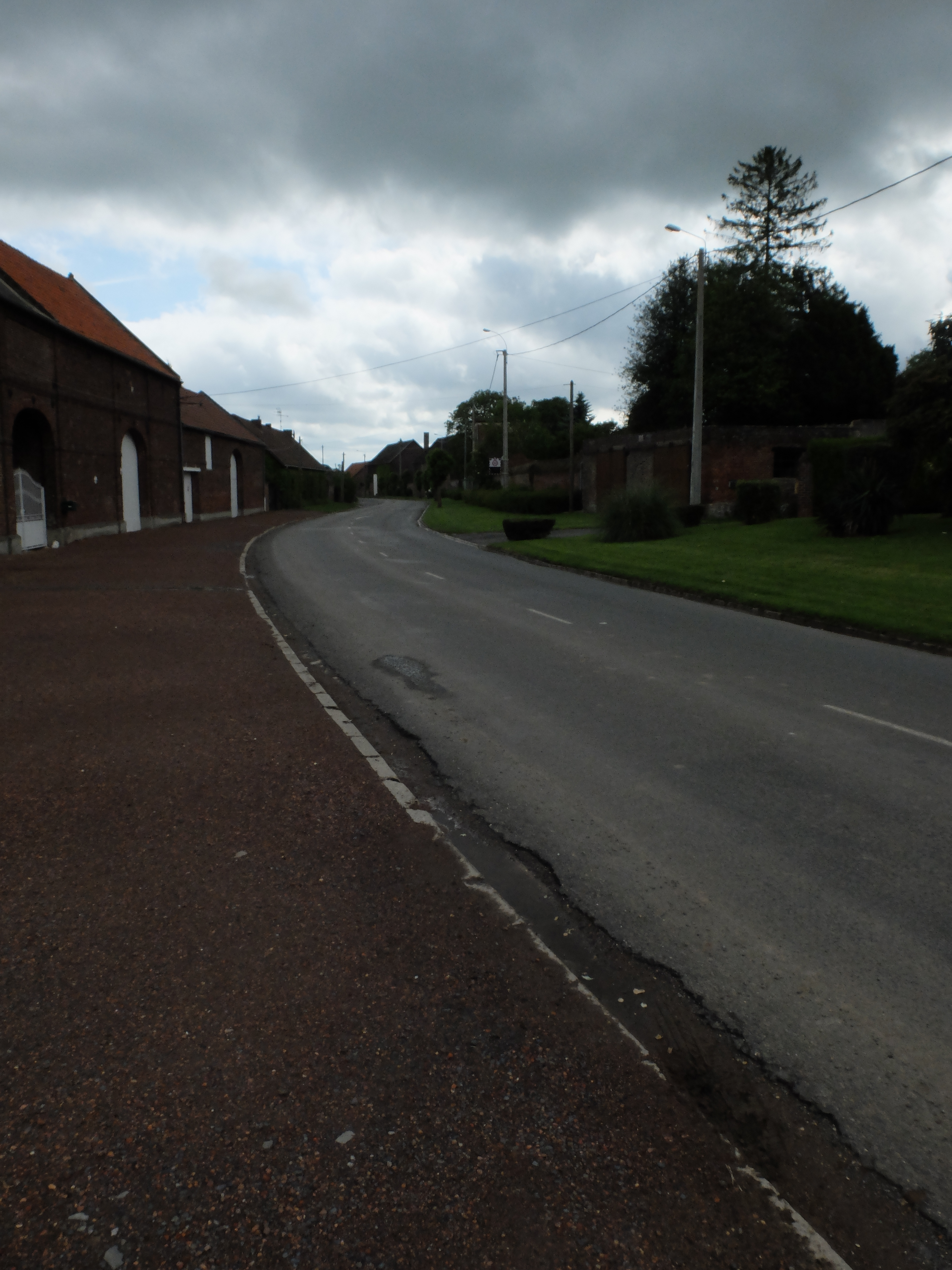
- The main road of Buissy

- Coat of arms
- Location of Buissy
- Location within France Location within Hauts-de-France
- Coordinates: 50°12′25″N 3°02′31″E
- Country: France
- Region: Hauts-de-France
- Department: Pas-de-Calais
- Arrondissement: Arras
- Canton: Bapaume
- Intercommunality: CC Osartis Marquion

Government
  - Mayor (2020–2026): Dominique Blary
- Area^{1}: 6.87 km^{2} (2.65 sq mi)
- Elevation: 58 m (190 ft)
- Highest elevation: 91 m (299 ft)
- Lowest elevation: 47 m (154 ft)
- Population (2023): 284
  - Density: 41.3/km^{2} (107/sq mi)
- Time zone: UTC+01:00 (CET)
  - Summer (DST): UTC+02:00 (CEST)
- INSEE/Postal code: 62184 /62860
- ^{1} French Land Register data, which excludes lakes, ponds, glaciers > 1 km^{2} (0.386 sq mi or 247 acres) and river estuaries.

Buissy (French pronunciation: [bɥisi]) is a commune in the Pas-de-Calais department in the Hauts-de-France region in northern France.

== Geography ==
A farming village located 15 miles (24 km) southeast of Arras on the D14 road, at the junction with the D19.

== Population ==
Historical population
Year	Pop.	±% p.a.
1968	255	—
1975	212	−2.60%
1982	202	−0.69%
1990	216	+0.84%
1999	229	+0.65%
2007	244	+0.80%
2012	249	+0.41%
2017	263	+1.10%
2023	284	+1.29%
Source: INSEE

== Sights ==
- The church of St. Médard, dating from the sixteenth century
- The Quéant Road Cemetery, overseen by the Commonwealth War Graves Commission.

== See also ==
- Communes of the Pas-de-Calais department
