= Pronville-en-Artois =

- Commune
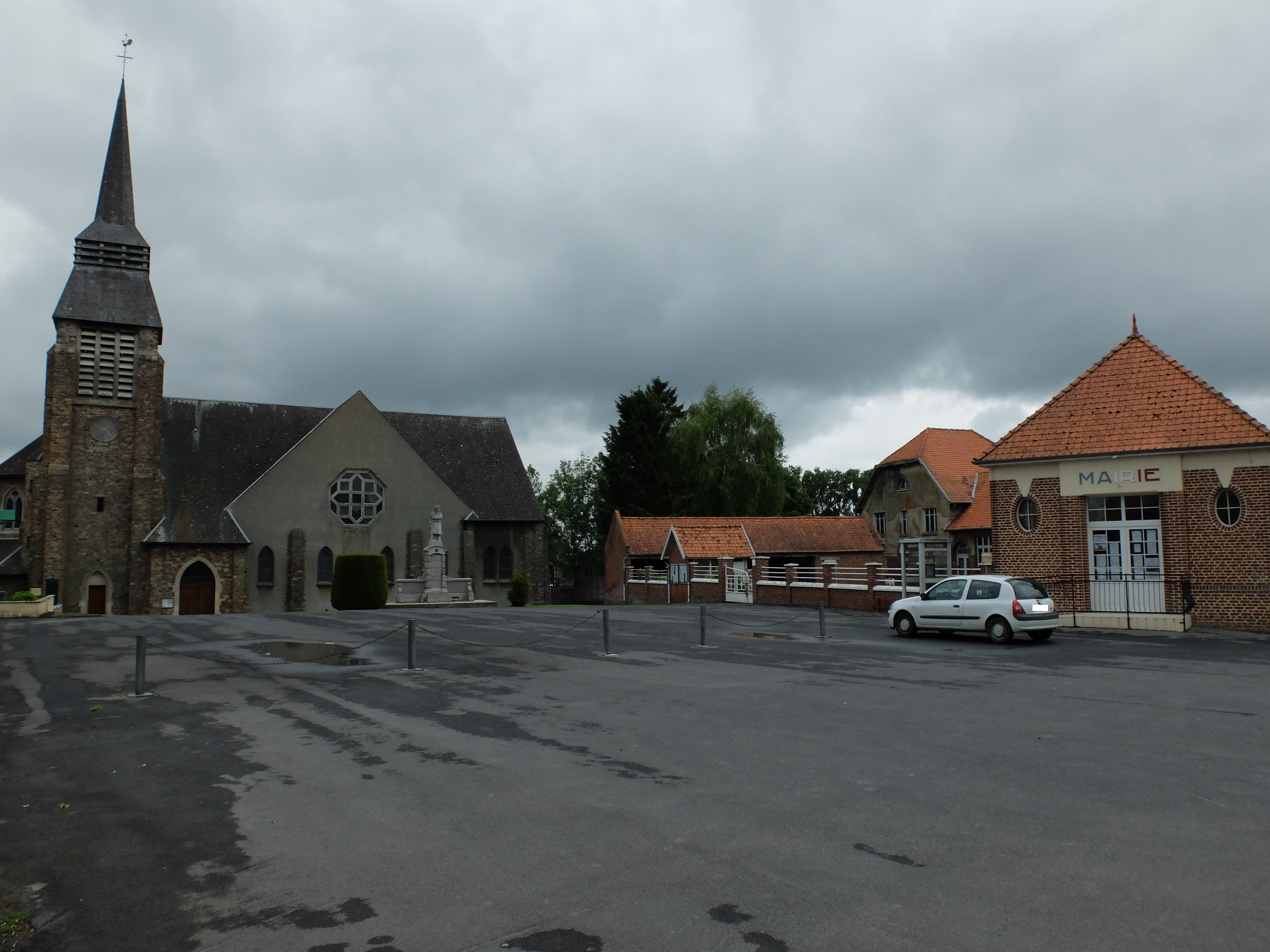
- The town hall and church of Pronville
- Location of Pronville-en-Artois
- Location within France Location within Hauts-de-France
- Coordinates: 50°10′30″N 3°00′13″E
- Country: France
- Region: Hauts-de-France
- Department: Pas-de-Calais
- Arrondissement: Arras
- Canton: Bapaume
- Intercommunality: CC Osartis Marquion

Government
  - Mayor (2020–2026): Isabelle Tournel
- Area^{1}: 6.09 km^{2} (2.35 sq mi)
- Elevation: 71 m (233 ft)
- Highest elevation: 98 m (322 ft)
- Lowest elevation: 58 m (190 ft)
- Population (2023): 307
  - Density: 50.4/km^{2} (131/sq mi)
- Time zone: UTC+01:00 (CET)
  - Summer (DST): UTC+02:00 (CEST)
- INSEE/Postal code: 62671 /62860
- ^{1} French Land Register data, which excludes lakes, ponds, glaciers > 1 km^{2} (0.386 sq mi or 247 acres) and river estuaries.

Pronville-en-Artois (French pronunciation: [pʁɔ̃vil ɑ̃n‿aʁtwɑ]; literally "Pronville in Artois"), simply Pronville until 2017, is a commune in the Pas-de-Calais department in the Hauts-de-France region of France 15 miles (24 km) southeast of Arras.

== Population ==
Historical population
Year	Pop.	±% p.a.
1968	358	—
1975	305	−2.26%
1982	261	−2.20%
1990	239	−1.09%
1999	272	+1.45%
2007	312	+1.73%
2012	334	+1.37%
2017	324	−0.61%
2023	307	−0.89%
Source: INSEE

== See also ==
- Communes of the Pas-de-Calais department
