= Baralle =

- Commune
- The war memorial and the church

- Coat of arms
- Location of Baralle
- Location within France Location within Hauts-de-France
- Coordinates: 50°12′45″N 3°03′32″E
- Country: France
- Region: Hauts-de-France
- Department: Pas-de-Calais
- Arrondissement: Arras
- Canton: Bapaume
- Intercommunality: CC Osartis Marquion

Government
  - Mayor (2020–2026): Jean-Pierre Lestocard
- Area^{1}: 7.95 km^{2} (3.07 sq mi)
- Elevation: 69 m (226 ft)
- Highest elevation: 78 m (256 ft)
- Lowest elevation: 44 m (144 ft)
- Population (2023): 434
  - Density: 54.6/km^{2} (141/sq mi)
- Time zone: UTC+01:00 (CET)
  - Summer (DST): UTC+02:00 (CEST)
- INSEE/Postal code: 62081 /62860
- ^{1} French Land Register data, which excludes lakes, ponds, glaciers > 1 km^{2} (0.386 sq mi or 247 acres) and river estuaries.

Baralle (French pronunciation: [baʁal]) is a commune in the Pas-de-Calais department in the Hauts-de-France region in northern France.

== Geography ==
A farming village located 15 miles (24 km) southeast of Arras at the junction of the D14, D16 and D19 roads. The entire commune was obliterated during World War I.

== Population ==
Historical population
Year	Pop.	±% p.a.
1968	491	—
1975	442	−1.49%
1982	418	−0.79%
1990	468	+1.42%
1999	487	+0.44%
2007	490	+0.08%
2012	473	−0.70%
2017	480	+0.29%
2023	434	−1.67%
Source: INSEE

== Sights ==
- The ruins of an early castle.
- The church of St. Georges, dating from the twentieth century.

== See also ==
- Communes of the Pas-de-Calais department
