= Lagnicourt-Marcel =

- Commune
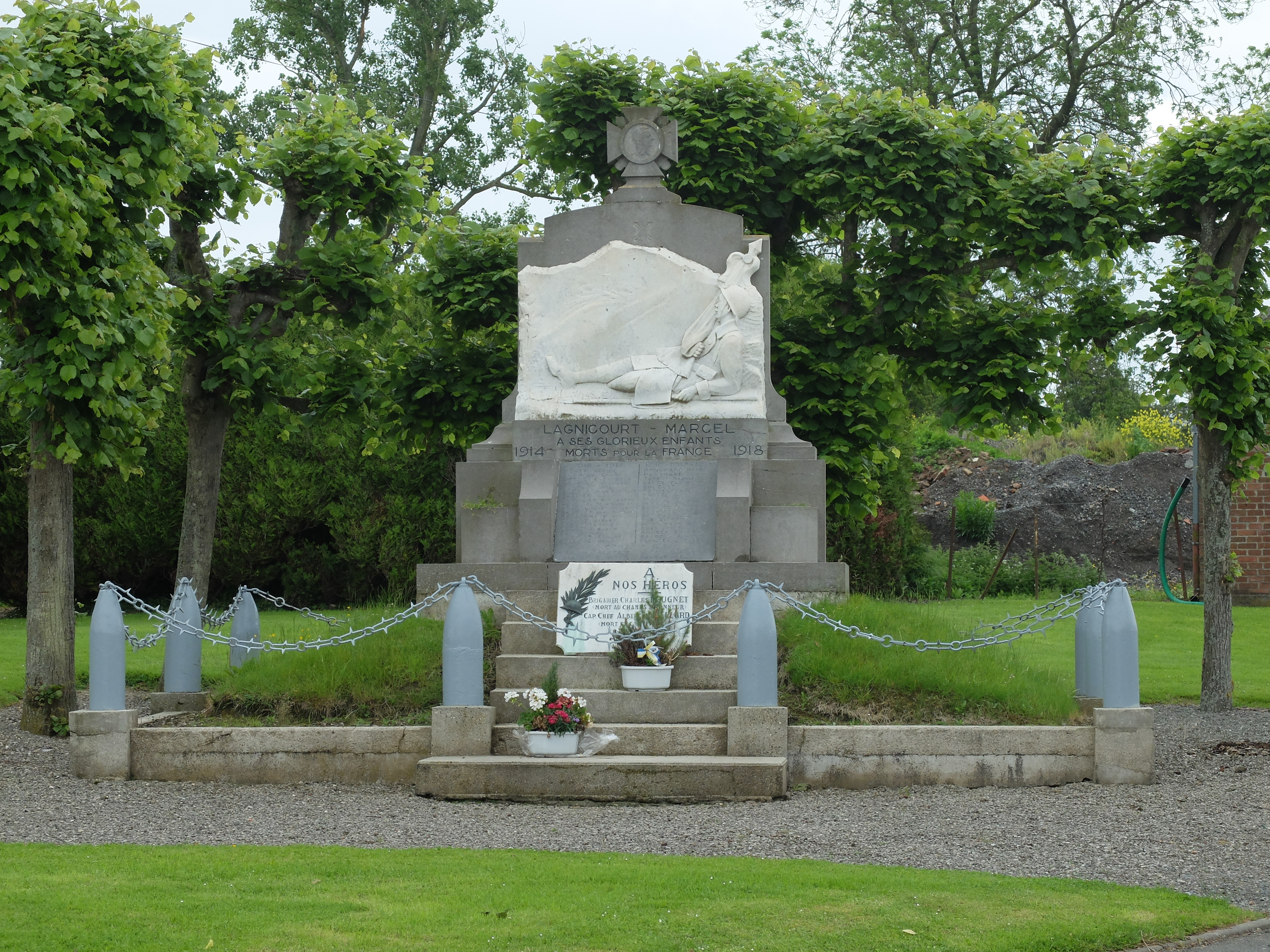
- Lagnicourt-Marcel - Monument to the Dead

- Coat of arms
- Location of Lagnicourt-Marcel
- Location within France Location within Hauts-de-France
- Coordinates: 50°09′30″N 2°57′24″E
- Country: France
- Region: Hauts-de-France
- Department: Pas-de-Calais
- Arrondissement: Arras
- Canton: Bapaume
- Intercommunality: CC Osartis Marquion

Government
  - Mayor (2020–2026): Francis Degand
- Area^{1}: 8.42 km^{2} (3.25 sq mi)
- Elevation: 83 m (272 ft)
- Highest elevation: 109 m (358 ft)
- Lowest elevation: 74 m (243 ft)
- Population (2023): 309
  - Density: 36.7/km^{2} (95.0/sq mi)
- Time zone: UTC+01:00 (CET)
  - Summer (DST): UTC+02:00 (CEST)
- INSEE/Postal code: 62484 /62159
- ^{1} French Land Register data, which excludes lakes, ponds, glaciers > 1 km^{2} (0.386 sq mi or 247 acres) and river estuaries.

Lagnicourt-Marcel (French pronunciation: [laɲikuʁ maʁsɛl]) is a commune in the Pas-de-Calais department in the Hauts-de-France region of France 15 miles (24 km) southeast of Arras.

== Population ==
Historical population
Year	Pop.	±% p.a.
1968	355	—
1975	335	−0.82%
1982	355	+0.83%
1990	327	−1.02%
1999	295	−1.14%
2007	314	+0.78%
2012	360	+2.77%
2017	331	−1.67%
2023	309	−1.14%
Source: INSEE

== See also ==
- Communes of the Pas-de-Calais department
