= Bourlon =

- Commune
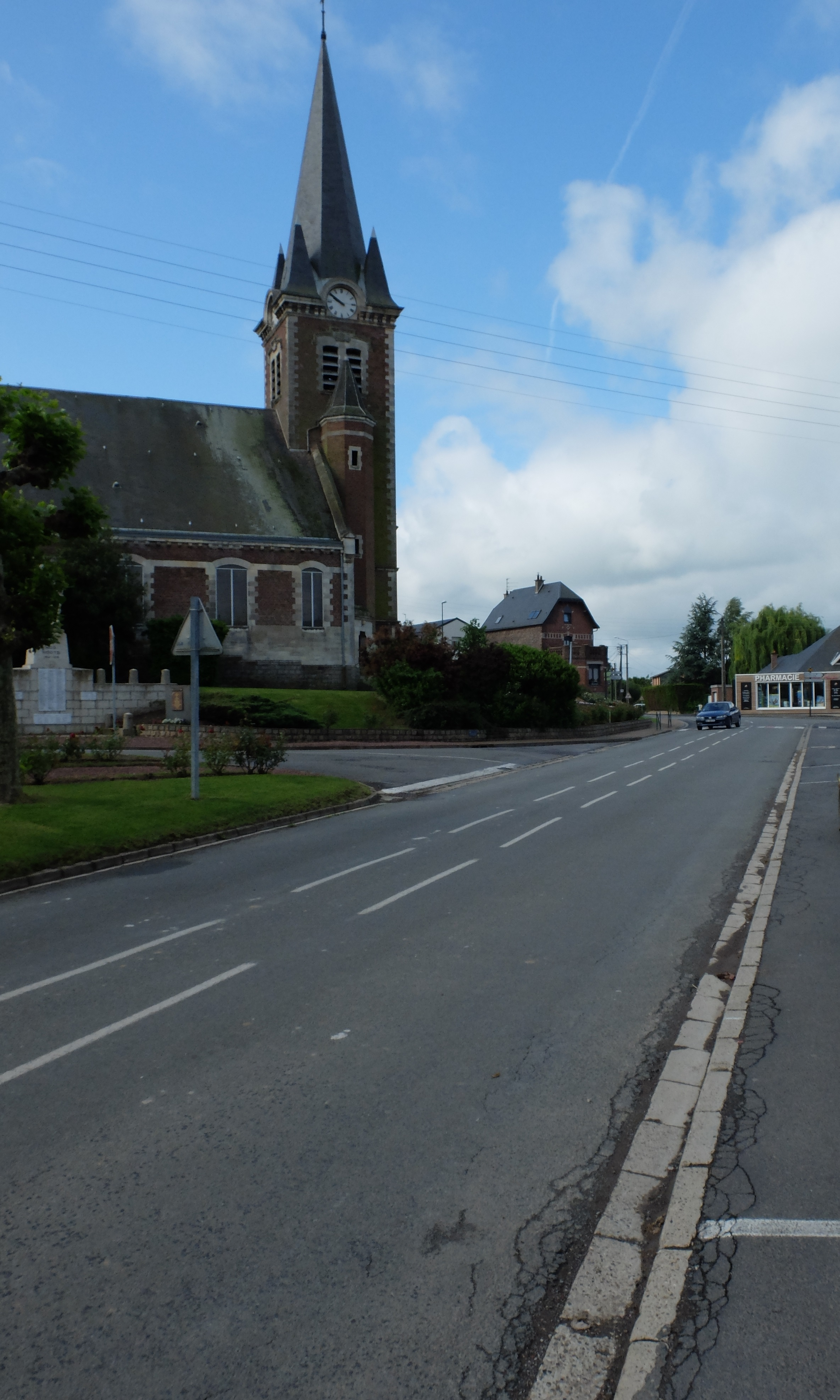
- The church of Bourlon

- Coat of arms
- Location of Bourlon
- Location within France Location within Hauts-de-France
- Coordinates: 50°10′43″N 3°07′03″E
- Country: France
- Region: Hauts-de-France
- Department: Pas-de-Calais
- Arrondissement: Arras
- Canton: Bapaume
- Intercommunality: CC Osartis Marquion

Government
  - Mayor (2020–2026): Jean-Luc Boyer
- Area^{1}: 12.3 km^{2} (4.7 sq mi)
- Elevation: 80 m (260 ft)
- Highest elevation: 127 m (417 ft)
- Lowest elevation: 53 m (174 ft)
- Population (2023): 1,156
  - Density: 94.0/km^{2} (243/sq mi)
- Time zone: UTC+01:00 (CET)
  - Summer (DST): UTC+02:00 (CEST)
- INSEE/Postal code: 62164 /62860
- ^{1} French Land Register data, which excludes lakes, ponds, glaciers > 1 km^{2} (0.386 sq mi or 247 acres) and river estuaries.

Bourlon (French pronunciation: [buʁlˈɔ̃]) is a commune in the Pas-de-Calais department in the Hauts-de-France region in northern France.

== Geography ==
A farming village located 22 miles (35 km) southeast of Arras on the D16 road, just yards from the A26 autoroute.

== Population ==
Historical population
Year	Pop.	±% p.a.
1968	1,123	—
1975	1,065	−0.75%
1982	1,135	+0.91%
1990	1,212	+0.82%
1999	1,246	+0.31%
2007	1,211	−0.36%
2012	1,224	+0.21%
2017	1,156	−1.14%
2023	1,156	+0.00%
Source: INSEE

== Sights ==
- The Canadian Bourlon Wood Memorial war memorial.
- The church of St. Martin, dating from the eighteenth century.
- Two 20th-century chapels.
- The Commonwealth War Graves Commission cemetery.

== See also ==
- Communes of the Pas-de-Calais department
