= Inchy-en-Artois =

- Commune
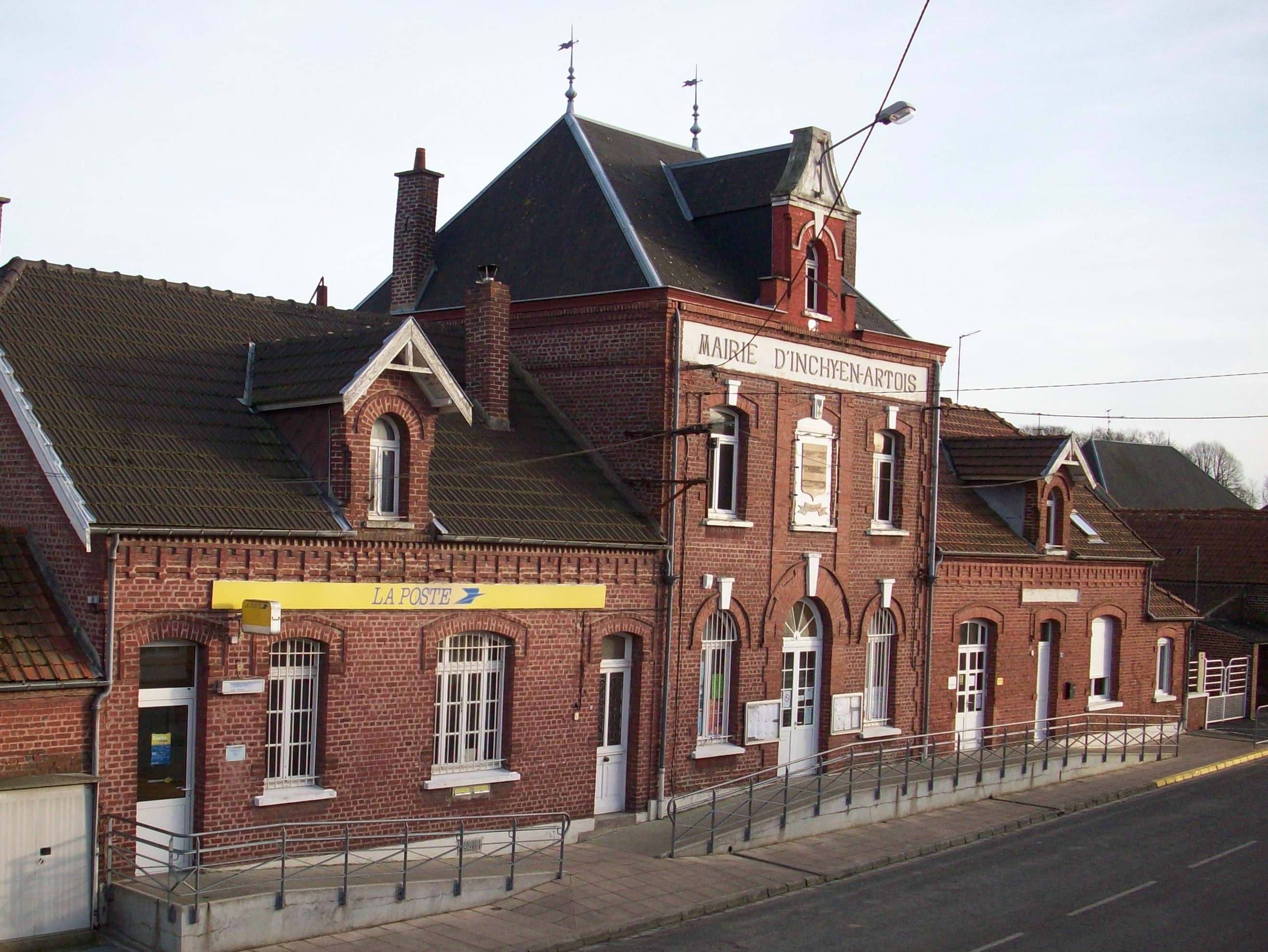
- Town hall

- Coat of arms
- Location of Inchy-en-Artois
- Location within France Location within Hauts-de-France
- Coordinates: 50°10′49″N 3°03′09″E
- Country: France
- Region: Hauts-de-France
- Department: Pas-de-Calais
- Arrondissement: Arras
- Canton: Bapaume
- Intercommunality: CC Osartis Marquion

Government
  - Mayor (2020–2026): Michel Rousseau
- Area^{1}: 11.06 km^{2} (4.27 sq mi)
- Elevation: 54 m (177 ft)
- Highest elevation: 97 m (318 ft)
- Lowest elevation: 48 m (157 ft)
- Population (2023): 575
  - Density: 52.0/km^{2} (135/sq mi)
- Time zone: UTC+01:00 (CET)
  - Summer (DST): UTC+02:00 (CEST)
- INSEE/Postal code: 62469 /62860
- ^{1} French Land Register data, which excludes lakes, ponds, glaciers > 1 km^{2} (0.386 sq mi or 247 acres) and river estuaries.

Inchy-en-Artois (French pronunciation: [ɛ̃ʃi ɑ̃n‿aʁtwɑ]; literally "Inchy in Artois") is a commune in the Pas-de-Calais department in the Hauts-de-France region of France. 17 miles (27 km) southeast of Arras.

== Population ==
Historical population
Year	Pop.	±% p.a.
1968	595	—
1975	576	−0.46%
1982	534	−1.08%
1990	576	+0.95%
1999	556	−0.39%
2007	550	−0.14%
2012	624	+2.56%
2017	624	+0.00%
2023	575	−1.35%
Source: INSEE

== See also ==
- Communes of the Pas-de-Calais department
