= Marquion =

- Commune
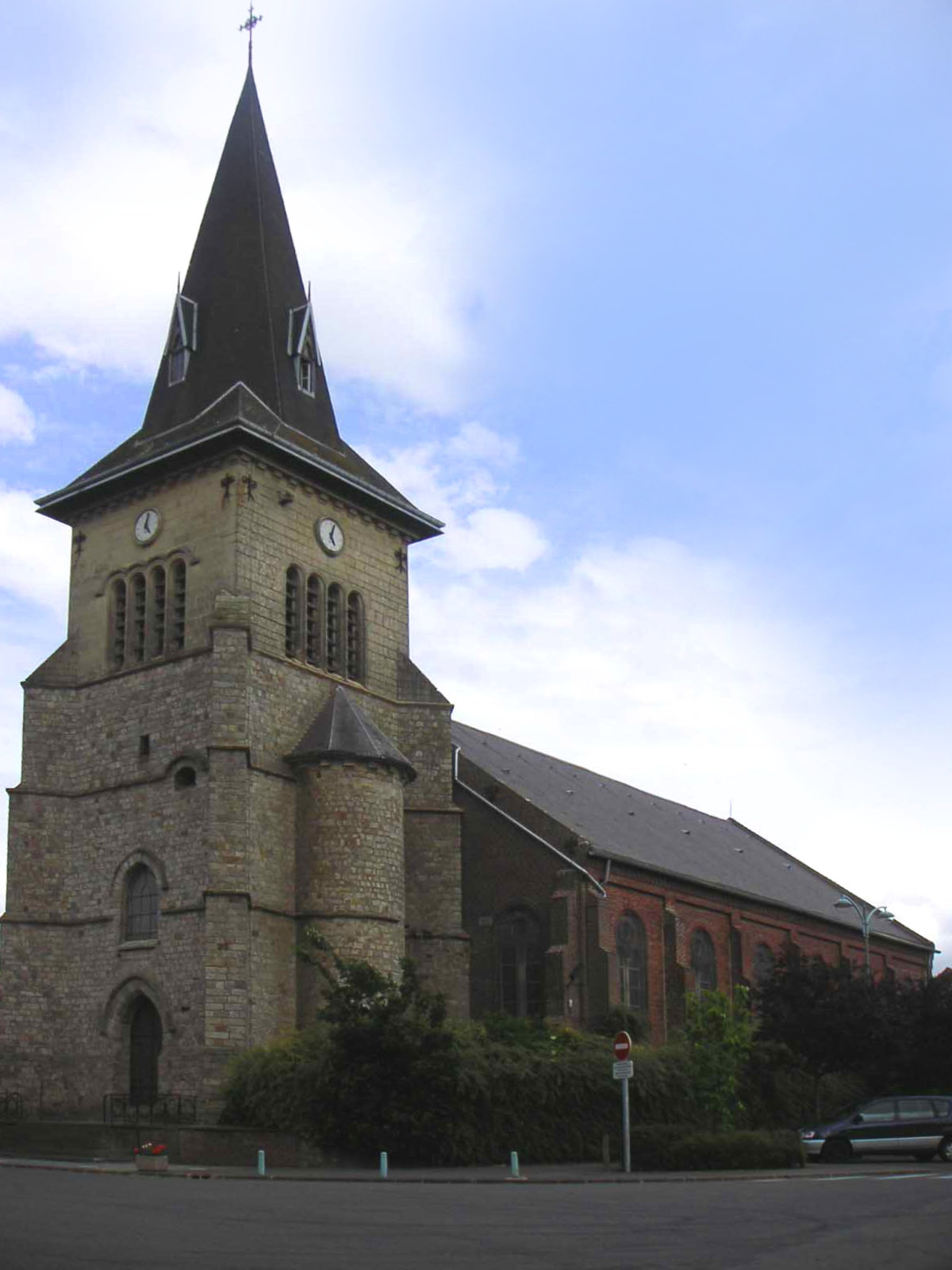
- The church of Marquion

- Coat of arms
- Location of Marquion
- Location within France Location within Hauts-de-France
- Coordinates: 50°12′42″N 3°05′12″E
- Country: France
- Region: Hauts-de-France
- Department: Pas-de-Calais
- Arrondissement: Arras
- Canton: Bapaume
- Intercommunality: CC Osartis Marquion

Government
  - Mayor (2020–2026): Jacques Petit
- Area^{1}: 8.22 km^{2} (3.17 sq mi)
- Elevation: 52 m (171 ft)
- Highest elevation: 79 m (259 ft)
- Lowest elevation: 43 m (141 ft)
- Population (2023): 1,039
  - Density: 126/km^{2} (327/sq mi)
- Time zone: UTC+01:00 (CET)
  - Summer (DST): UTC+02:00 (CEST)
- INSEE/Postal code: 62559 /62860
- ^{1} French Land Register data, which excludes lakes, ponds, glaciers > 1 km^{2} (0.386 sq mi or 247 acres) and river estuaries.

Marquion (French pronunciation: [maʁkjɔ̃]) is a commune in the Pas-de-Calais department in the Hauts-de-France region of France 18 miles (29 km) southwest of Arras.

== Population ==
Historical population
Year	Pop.	±% p.a.
1968	859	—
1975	874	+0.25%
1982	887	+0.21%
1990	947	+0.82%
1999	1,008	+0.70%
2007	953	−0.70%
2012	963	+0.21%
2017	976	+0.27%
2023	1,039	+1.05%
Source: INSEE

== See also ==
- Communes of the Pas-de-Calais department
