= Graincourt-lès-Havrincourt =

- Commune
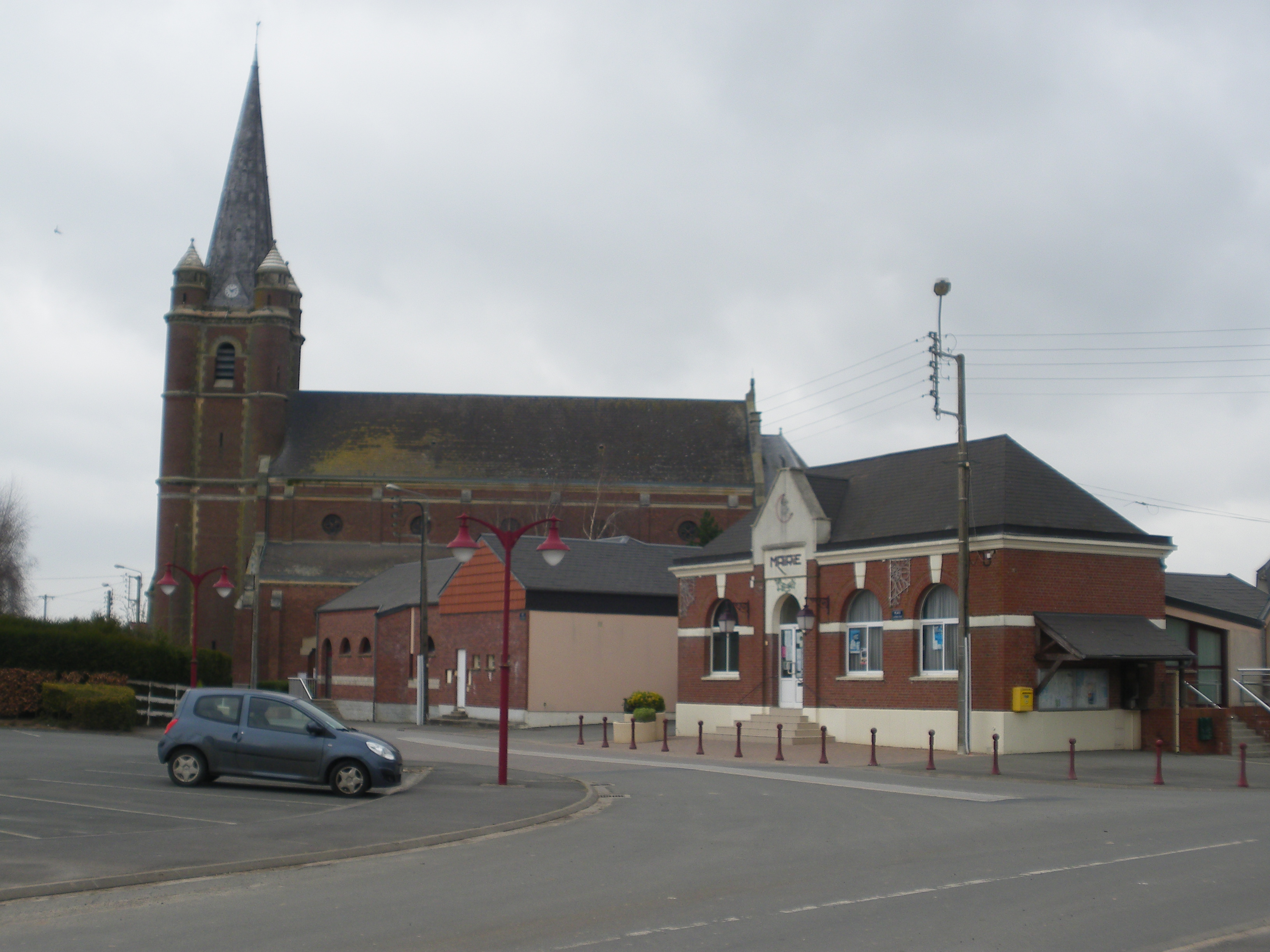
- The center of the commune

- Coat of arms
- Location of Graincourt-lès-Havrincourt
- Location within France Location within Hauts-de-France
- Coordinates: 50°08′43″N 3°06′37″E
- Country: France
- Region: Hauts-de-France
- Department: Pas-de-Calais
- Arrondissement: Arras
- Canton: Bapaume
- Intercommunality: CC Osartis Marquion

Government
  - Mayor (2020–2026): Jean-Marcel Dumont
- Area^{1}: 11.57 km^{2} (4.47 sq mi)
- Elevation: 79 m (259 ft)
- Highest elevation: 101 m (331 ft)
- Lowest elevation: 61 m (200 ft)
- Population (2023): 632
  - Density: 54.6/km^{2} (141/sq mi)
- Time zone: UTC+01:00 (CET)
  - Summer (DST): UTC+02:00 (CEST)
- INSEE/Postal code: 62384 /62147
- ^{1} French Land Register data, which excludes lakes, ponds, glaciers > 1 km^{2} (0.386 sq mi or 247 acres) and river estuaries.

Graincourt-lès-Havrincourt is a commune in the Pas-de-Calais department in the Hauts-de-France region of France.

== Geography ==
A farming village situated 22 miles (35 km) southeast of Arras, at the junction of the D15 and C5 roads. The A26 autoroute junction with the A2 autoroute is only half a mile from the commune.

== Population ==
Historical population
Year	Pop.	±% p.a.
1968	633	—
1975	605	−0.64%
1982	610	+0.12%
1990	611	+0.02%
1999	617	+0.11%
2007	615	−0.04%
2012	635	+0.64%
2017	638	+0.09%
2023	632	−0.16%
Source: INSEE

== Places of interest ==
- The church of St.Martin, rebuilt along with the rest of the village after World War I.
- The Commonwealth War Graves Commission cemetery.

== See also ==
- Communes of the Pas-de-Calais department
