= Canton of Bertincourt =

Coordinates: 50°05′26″N 2°59′27″E

Bertincourt
- Former canton
- Interactive map of Bertincourt
- Country: France
- Region: Hauts-de-France
- Department: Pas-de-Calais
- No. of communes: {{{nbcomm}}}
- Disbanded: 2015
- Area: 120.19 km^{2} (46.41 sq mi)
- Population (2012): 6,755
  - Density: 56.20/km^{2} (145.6/sq mi)

The Canton of Bertincourt is a former canton located in the Pas-de-Calais department of the Nord-Pas-de-Calais region of northern France. It was disbanded following the French canton reorganisation, which came into effect in March 2015. The canton consisted of 18 communes, which joined the canton of Bapaume in 2015. It had a total of 6,755 inhabitants (2012, without double counting).

== Geography ==
The canton is organised around Bertincourt in the arrondissement of Arras. The altitude varies from 67m (Havrincourt) to 137m (Rocquigny) for an average altitude of 118m.

The canton comprised 18 communes:

- Barastre
- Beaumetz-lès-Cambrai
- Bertincourt
- Beugny
- Bus
- Haplincourt
- Havrincourt
- Hermies
- Lebucquière
- Léchelle
- Metz-en-Couture
- Morchies
- Neuville-Bourjonval
- Rocquigny
- Ruyaulcourt
- Trescault
- Vélu
- Ytres

== Population ==
Population Evolution
1962	1968	1975	1982	1990	1999
6888	7346	6853	6363	6177	6366
Census count starting from 1962 : Population without double counting

== See also ==
- Cantons of Pas-de-Calais
- Communes of Pas-de-Calais
- Arrondissements of the Pas-de-Calais department
