= Communauté de communes de la Région de Bapaume =

Coordinates: 50.1032°N 2.8497°E

Région de Bapaume
- Former communauté de communes
- Interactive map of Région de Bapaume
- Country: France
- Region: Hauts-de-France
- Department: Pas-de-Calais
- No. of communes: {{{nbcomm}}}
- Established: 1993
- Disbanded: 2013
- Area: 145 km^{2} (56 sq mi)
- Population (2009): 13,130
  - Density: 90.6/km^{2} (235/sq mi)

The Communauté de communes de la Région de Bapaume was located in the Pas-de-Calais département, in northern France. It was created in January 1993. It was merged into the new Communauté de communes du Sud-Artois in January 2013.

== Composition ==
It comprised the following 26 communes:

1. Ablainzevelle
2. Achiet-le-Grand
3. Achiet-le-Petit
4. Avesnes-lès-Bapaume
5. Bancourt
6. Bapaume
7. Beaulencourt
8. Béhagnies
9. Beugnâtre
10. Biefvillers-lès-Bapaume
11. Bihucourt
12. Bucquoy
13. Douchy-lès-Ayette
14. Favreuil
15. Frémicourt
16. Grévillers
17. Le Sars
18. Le Transloy
19. Ligny-Thilloy
20. Martinpuich
21. Morval
22. Riencourt-lès-Bapaume
23. Sapignies
24. Vaulx-Vraucourt
25. Villers-au-Flos
26. Warlencourt-Eaucourt
