= Hamelincourt =

- Commune
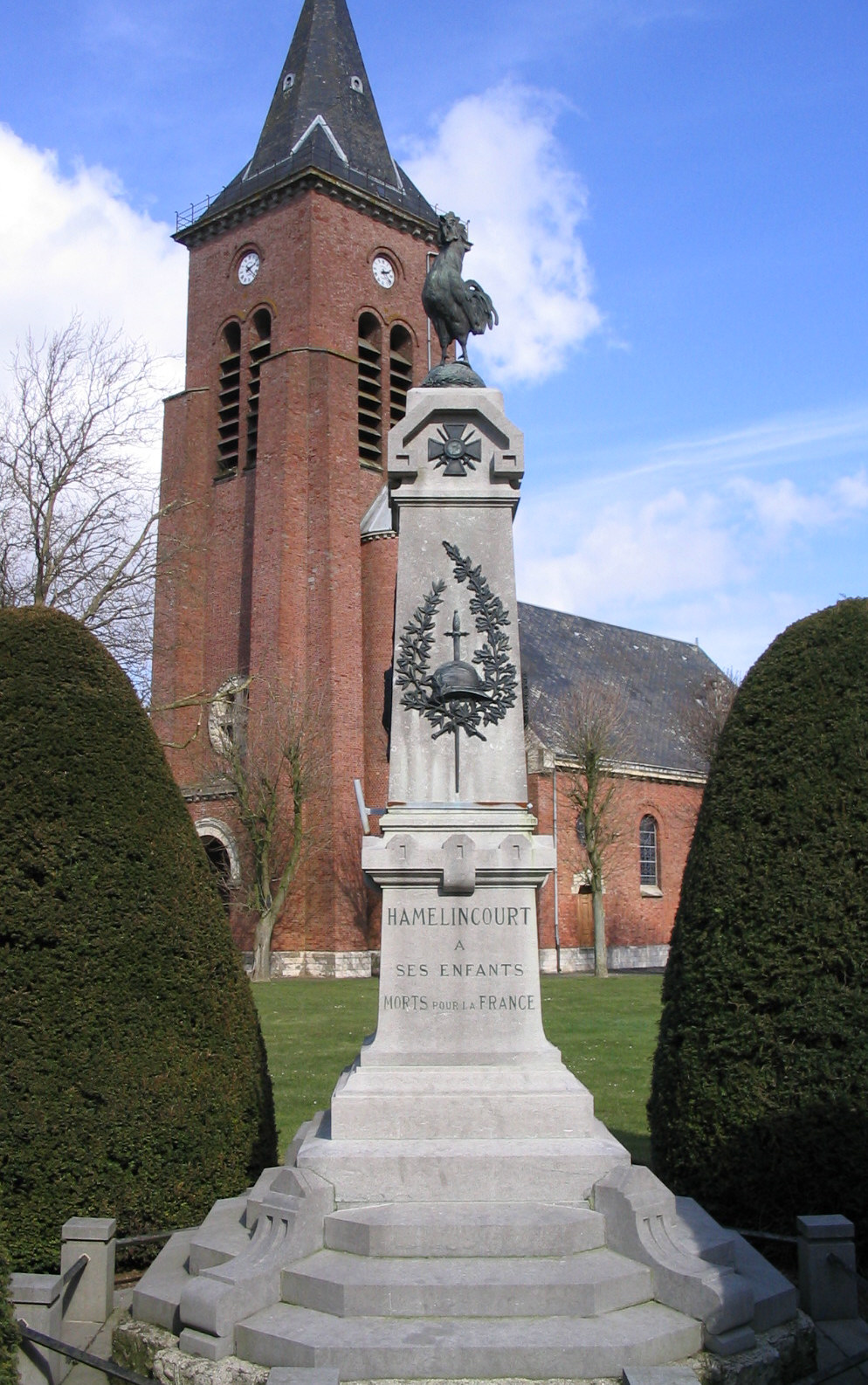
- The monument to the dead and church of Hamelincourt

- Coat of arms
- Location of Hamelincourt
- Location within France Location within Hauts-de-France
- Coordinates: 50°11′05″N 2°48′00″E
- Country: France
- Region: Hauts-de-France
- Department: Pas-de-Calais
- Arrondissement: Arras
- Canton: Bapaume
- Intercommunality: CC Sud-Artois

Government
  - Mayor (2020–2026): Denis Bizart
- Area^{1}: 6.64 km^{2} (2.56 sq mi)
- Elevation: 105 m (344 ft)
- Highest elevation: 117 m (384 ft)
- Lowest elevation: 78 m (256 ft)
- Population (2023): 260
  - Density: 39/km^{2} (100/sq mi)
- Time zone: UTC+01:00 (CET)
  - Summer (DST): UTC+02:00 (CEST)
- INSEE/Postal code: 62406 /62121
- ^{1} French Land Register data, which excludes lakes, ponds, glaciers > 1 km^{2} (0.386 sq mi or 247 acres) and river estuaries.

Hamelincourt (French pronunciation: [amlɛ̃kuʁ]) is a commune in the Pas-de-Calais department in the Hauts-de-France region of France.

== Geography ==
A farming village situated 8 miles (13 km) south of Arras, at the junction of the D36 and the D12 roads.

== Population ==
Historical population
Year	Pop.	±% p.a.
1968	251	—
1975	215	−2.19%
1982	210	−0.34%
1990	198	−0.73%
1999	249	+2.58%
2007	264	+0.73%
2012	262	−0.15%
2017	255	−0.54%
2023	260	+0.32%
Source: INSEE

== Places of interest ==
- The church of St. Vaast, rebuilt along with the entire village, after World War I.

== See also ==
- Communes of the Pas-de-Calais department
