= Souastre =

- Commune
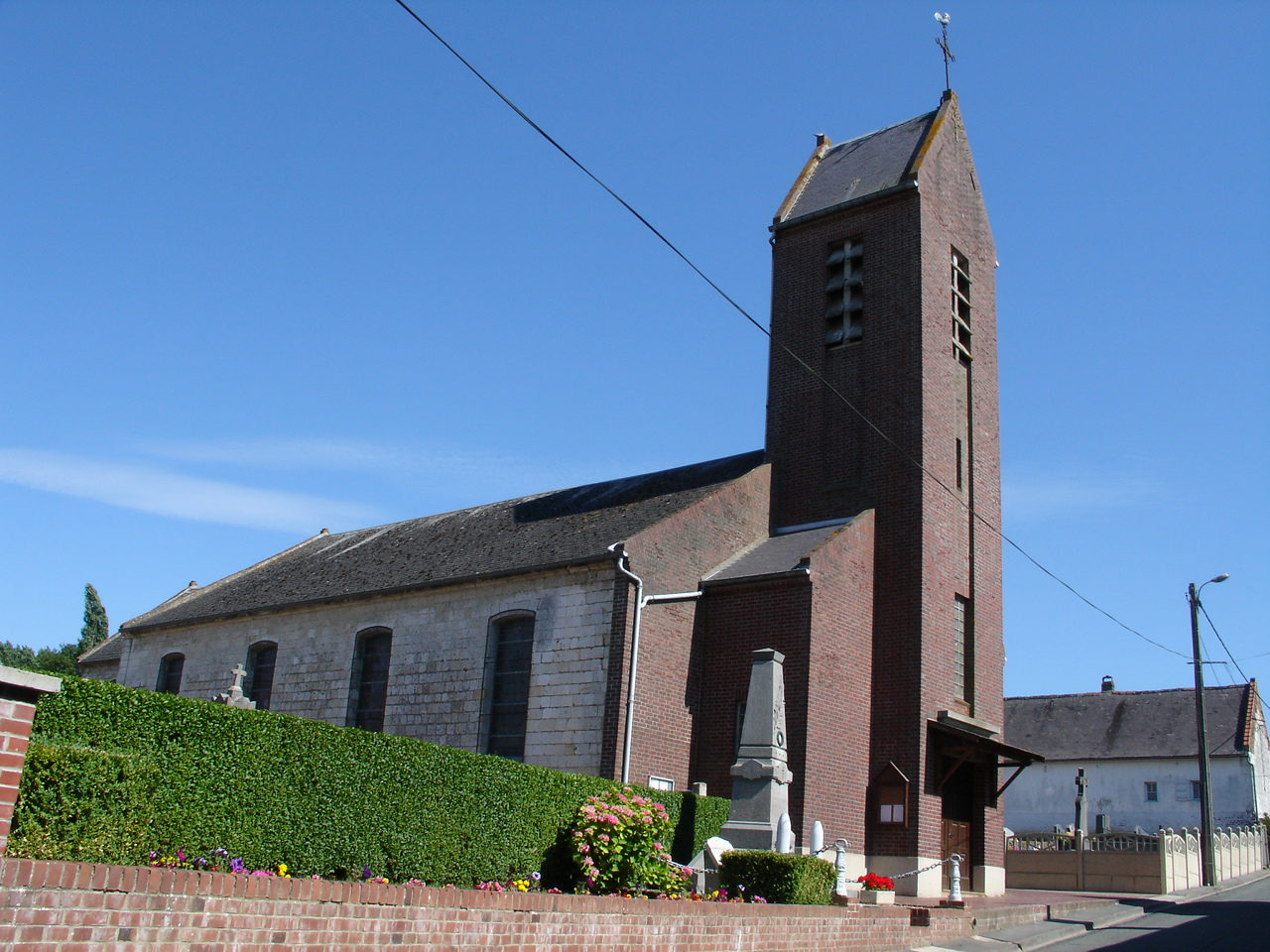
- The church of Souastre

- Coat of arms
- Location of Souastre
- Location within France Location within Hauts-de-France
- Coordinates: 50°09′11″N 2°33′54″E
- Country: France
- Region: Hauts-de-France
- Department: Pas-de-Calais
- Arrondissement: Arras
- Canton: Avesnes-le-Comte
- Intercommunality: CC Sud-Artois

Government
  - Mayor (2020–2026): Thierry Roucou
- Area^{1}: 7.24 km^{2} (2.80 sq mi)
- Elevation: 139 m (456 ft)
- Highest elevation: 165 m (541 ft)
- Lowest elevation: 119 m (390 ft)
- Population (2023): 375
  - Density: 51.8/km^{2} (134/sq mi)
- Time zone: UTC+01:00 (CET)
  - Summer (DST): UTC+02:00 (CEST)
- INSEE/Postal code: 62800 /62111
- ^{1} French Land Register data, which excludes lakes, ponds, glaciers > 1 km^{2} (0.386 sq mi or 247 acres) and river estuaries.

Souastre is a commune in the Pas-de-Calais department in the Hauts-de-France region of France 15 miles (24 km) southwest of Arras.

== Population ==
Historical population
Year	Pop.	±% p.a.
1968	442	—
1975	434	−0.26%
1982	368	−2.33%
1990	352	−0.55%
1999	324	−0.92%
2007	339	+0.57%
2012	361	+1.27%
2017	379	+0.98%
2023	375	−0.18%
Source: INSEE

== See also ==
- Communes of the Pas-de-Calais department
