= Communauté de communes du Sud-Artois =

Federation of municipalities in France

Sud-Artois
- Communauté de communes
- Interactive map of Sud-Artois
- Coordinates: 50°06′N 02°51′E
- Country: France
- Region: Hauts-de-France
- Department: Pas-de-Calais
- No. of communes: {{{nbcomm}}}
- Established: 2013
- Area: 426.1 km^{2} (164.5 sq mi)
- Population (2018): 27,349
  - Density: 64.18/km^{2} (166.2/sq mi)

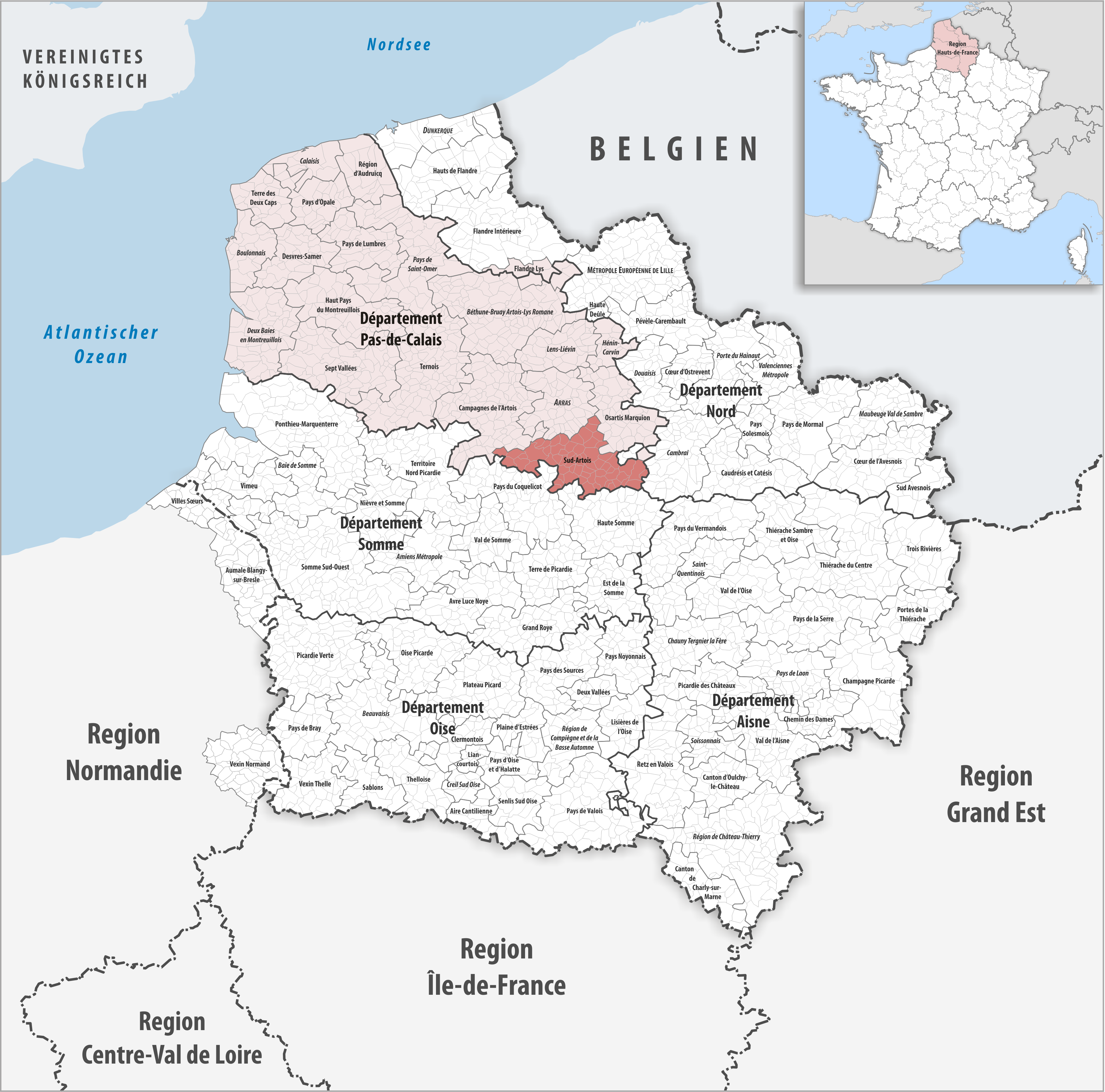
Location of the Sud-Artois municipal association

The Communauté de communes du Sud-Artois is a communauté de communes, an intercommunal structure, in the Pas-de-Calais department, in the Hauts-de-France region, northern France. It was created in January 2013 by the merger of the former communautés de communes Région de Bapaume, canton de Bertincourt and Sud Arrageois (partly). Its area is 426.1 km^{2}, and its population was 27,349 in 2018. Its seat is in Bapaume.

== Composition ==
The communauté de communes consists of the following 64 communes:

1. Ablainzevelle
2. Achiet-le-Grand
3. Achiet-le-Petit
4. Avesnes-lès-Bapaume
5. Ayette
6. Bancourt
7. Bapaume
8. Barastre
9. Beaulencourt
10. Beaumetz-lès-Cambrai
11. Béhagnies
12. Bertincourt
13. Beugnâtre
14. Beugny
15. Biefvillers-lès-Bapaume
16. Bihucourt
17. Bucquoy
18. Bullecourt
19. Bus
20. Chérisy
21. Courcelles-le-Comte
22. Croisilles
23. Douchy-lès-Ayette
24. Écoust-Saint-Mein
25. Ervillers
26. Favreuil
27. Foncquevillers
28. Fontaine-lès-Croisilles
29. Frémicourt
30. Gomiécourt
31. Gommecourt
32. Grévillers
33. Hamelincourt
34. Haplincourt
35. Havrincourt
36. Hébuterne
37. Hermies
38. Lebucquière
39. Léchelle
40. Ligny-Thilloy
41. Martinpuich
42. Metz-en-Couture
43. Morchies
44. Morval
45. Mory
46. Moyenneville
47. Neuville-Bourjonval
48. Noreuil
49. Puisieux
50. Riencourt-lès-Bapaume
51. Rocquigny
52. Ruyaulcourt
53. Sailly-au-Bois
54. Saint-Léger
55. Sapignies
56. Le Sars
57. Souastre
58. Le Transloy
59. Trescault
60. Vaulx-Vraucourt
61. Vélu
62. Villers-au-Flos
63. Warlencourt-Eaucourt
64. Ytres
