= Le Transloy =

- Commune
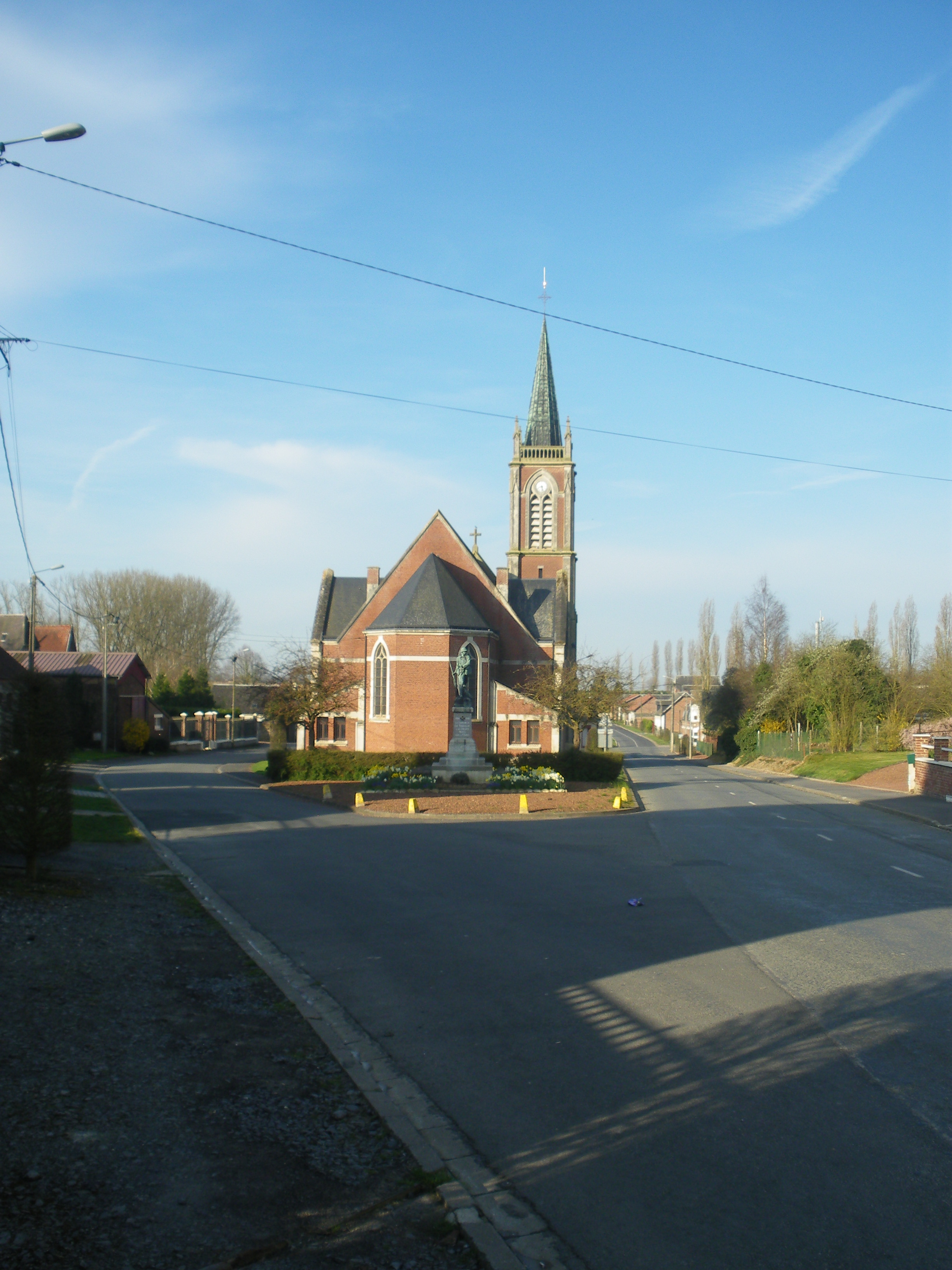
- The church of Le Transloy
- Location of Le Transloy
- Location within France Location within Hauts-de-France
- Coordinates: 50°03′36″N 2°53′39″E
- Country: France
- Region: Hauts-de-France
- Department: Pas-de-Calais
- Arrondissement: Arras
- Canton: Bapaume
- Intercommunality: CC Sud-Artois

Government
  - Mayor (2020–2026): Daniel Dhouailly
- Area^{1}: 10.41 km^{2} (4.02 sq mi)
- Elevation: 110 m (360 ft)
- Highest elevation: 151 m (495 ft)
- Lowest elevation: 108 m (354 ft)
- Population (2023): 422
  - Density: 40.5/km^{2} (105/sq mi)
- Time zone: UTC+01:00 (CET)
  - Summer (DST): UTC+02:00 (CEST)
- INSEE/Postal code: 62829 /62450
- ^{1} French Land Register data, which excludes lakes, ponds, glaciers > 1 km^{2} (0.386 sq mi or 247 acres) and river estuaries.

Le Transloy (French pronunciation: [lə tʁɑ̃lwa]) is a commune in the Pas-de-Calais department in the Hauts-de-France region of France 18 miles (29 km) south of Arras.

== Population ==
Historical population
Year	Pop.	±% p.a.
1968	447	—
1975	405	−1.40%
1982	399	−0.21%
1990	390	−0.28%
1999	371	−0.55%
2007	424	+1.68%
2012	417	−0.33%
2017	411	−0.29%
2023	422	+0.44%
Source: INSEE

== See also ==
- Communes of the Pas-de-Calais department
- Battle of Le Transloy
