= Vélu =

- Commune
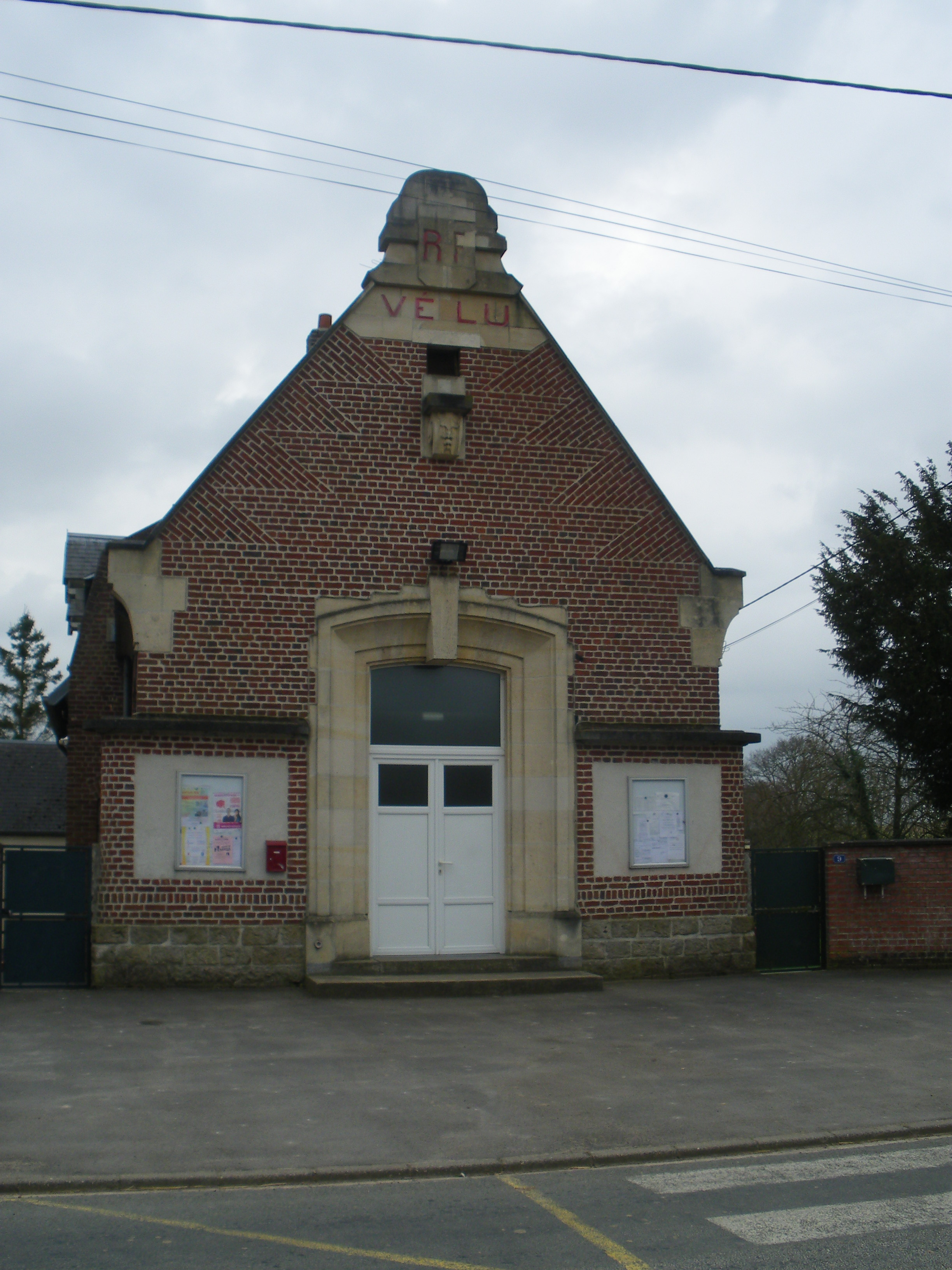
- The town hall of Vélu
- Location of Vélu
- Location within France Location within Hauts-de-France
- Coordinates: 50°06′25″N 2°58′23″E
- Country: France
- Region: Hauts-de-France
- Department: Pas-de-Calais
- Arrondissement: Arras
- Canton: Bapaume
- Intercommunality: CC Sud-Artois

Government
  - Mayor (2020–2026): Daniel Bouquillon
- Area^{1}: 3.14 km^{2} (1.21 sq mi)
- Elevation: 112 m (367 ft)
- Highest elevation: 124 m (407 ft)
- Lowest elevation: 96 m (315 ft)
- Population (2023): 130
  - Density: 41/km^{2} (110/sq mi)
- Time zone: UTC+01:00 (CET)
  - Summer (DST): UTC+02:00 (CEST)
- INSEE/Postal code: 62840 /62124
- ^{1} French Land Register data, which excludes lakes, ponds, glaciers > 1 km^{2} (0.386 sq mi or 247 acres) and river estuaries.

Vélu (French pronunciation: [vely]) is a commune in the Pas-de-Calais department in the Hauts-de-France region of France about 20 miles (32 km) southeast of Arras.

== Population ==
Historical population
Year	Pop.	±% p.a.
1968	187	—
1975	134	−4.65%
1982	138	+0.42%
1990	130	−0.74%
1999	136	+0.50%
2007	128	−0.75%
2012	133	+0.77%
2017	135	+0.30%
2023	130	−0.63%
Source: INSEE

== See also ==
- Communes of the Pas-de-Calais department
