= Barastre =

- Commune
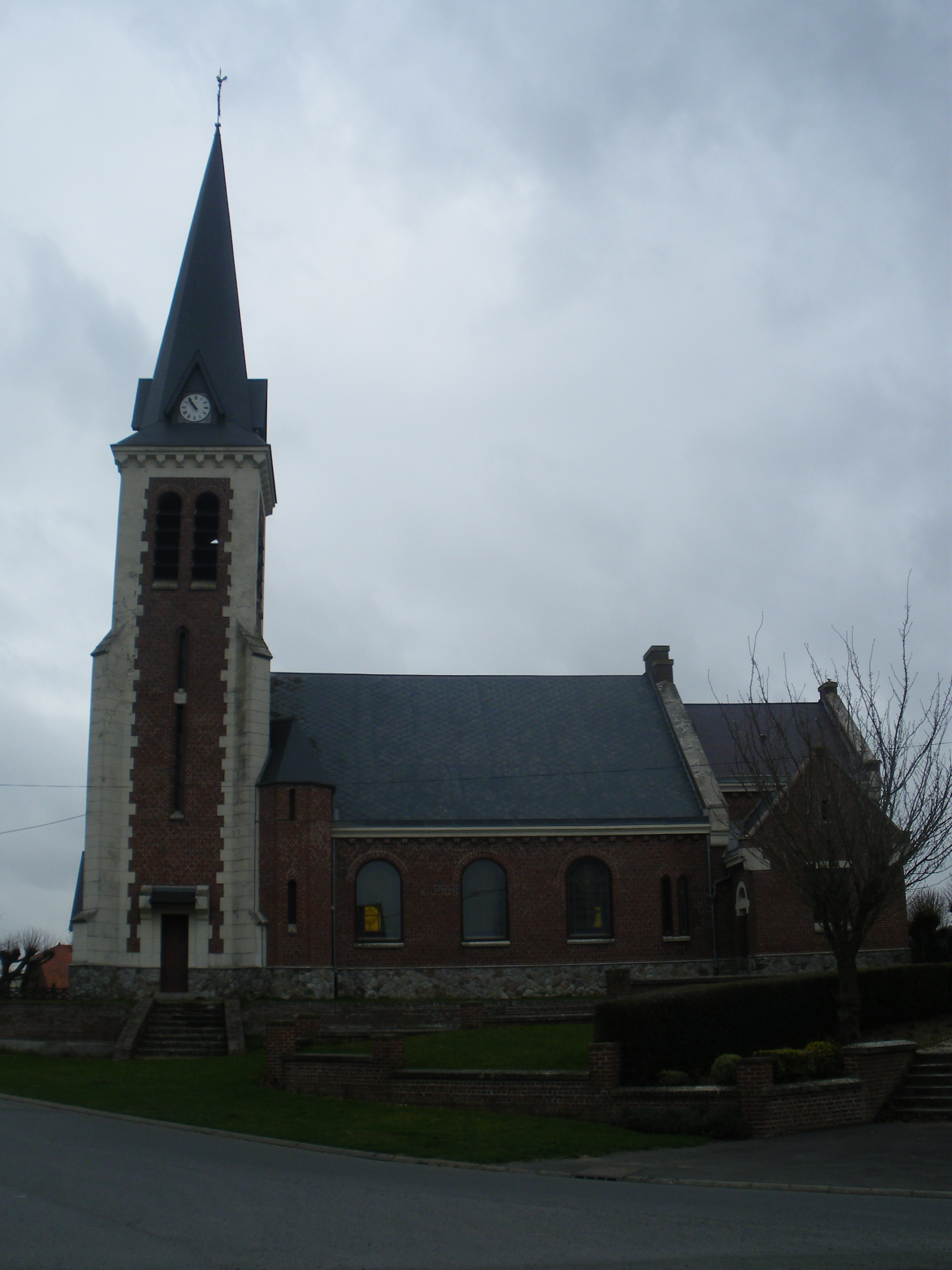
- The church of Barastre

- Coat of arms
- Location of Barastre
- Location within France Location within Hauts-de-France
- Coordinates: 50°04′39″N 2°56′00″E
- Country: France
- Region: Hauts-de-France
- Department: Pas-de-Calais
- Arrondissement: Arras
- Canton: Bapaume
- Intercommunality: CC du Sud-Artois

Government
  - Mayor (2020–2026): Gislain Boury
- Area^{1}: 7.64 km^{2} (2.95 sq mi)
- Elevation: 119 m (390 ft)
- Highest elevation: 133 m (436 ft)
- Lowest elevation: 113 m (371 ft)
- Population (2023): 308
  - Density: 40.3/km^{2} (104/sq mi)
- Time zone: UTC+01:00 (CET)
  - Summer (DST): UTC+02:00 (CEST)
- INSEE/Postal code: 62082 /62124
- ^{1} French Land Register data, which excludes lakes, ponds, glaciers > 1 km^{2} (0.386 sq mi or 247 acres) and river estuaries.

Barastre is a commune in the Pas-de-Calais department in the Hauts-de-France region in northern France.

== Geography ==
A farming village located 19 miles (30 km) southeast of Arras on the D20 road. The entire commune was destroyed during World War I.

== History ==
During World War I, the village was occupied by British troops in March 1917, before being lost a year later to the Germans. The village was retaken on 5 September, following an advance by the 42nd British division (East Lancashire). Nearly 10 British soldiers are buried in this cemetery (one of whom was buried by the Germans in 1916). In the cemetery extension are the graves of 284 German soldiers, 46 French, 39 British, four New Zealanders and one Australian. The commune was awarded the Croix de Guerre in 1920.

== Population ==
Historical population
Year	Pop.	±% p.a.
1968	334	—
1975	308	−1.15%
1982	267	−2.02%
1990	223	−2.23%
1999	232	+0.44%
2007	243	+0.58%
2012	276	+2.58%
2017	307	+2.15%
2023	308	+0.05%
Source: INSEE

== Sights ==
- The ruins of an early castle.
- The church of St. Martin, dating from the twentieth century.
- The war memorial.

== See also ==
- Communes of the Pas-de-Calais department
