= Ruyaulcourt =

- Commune
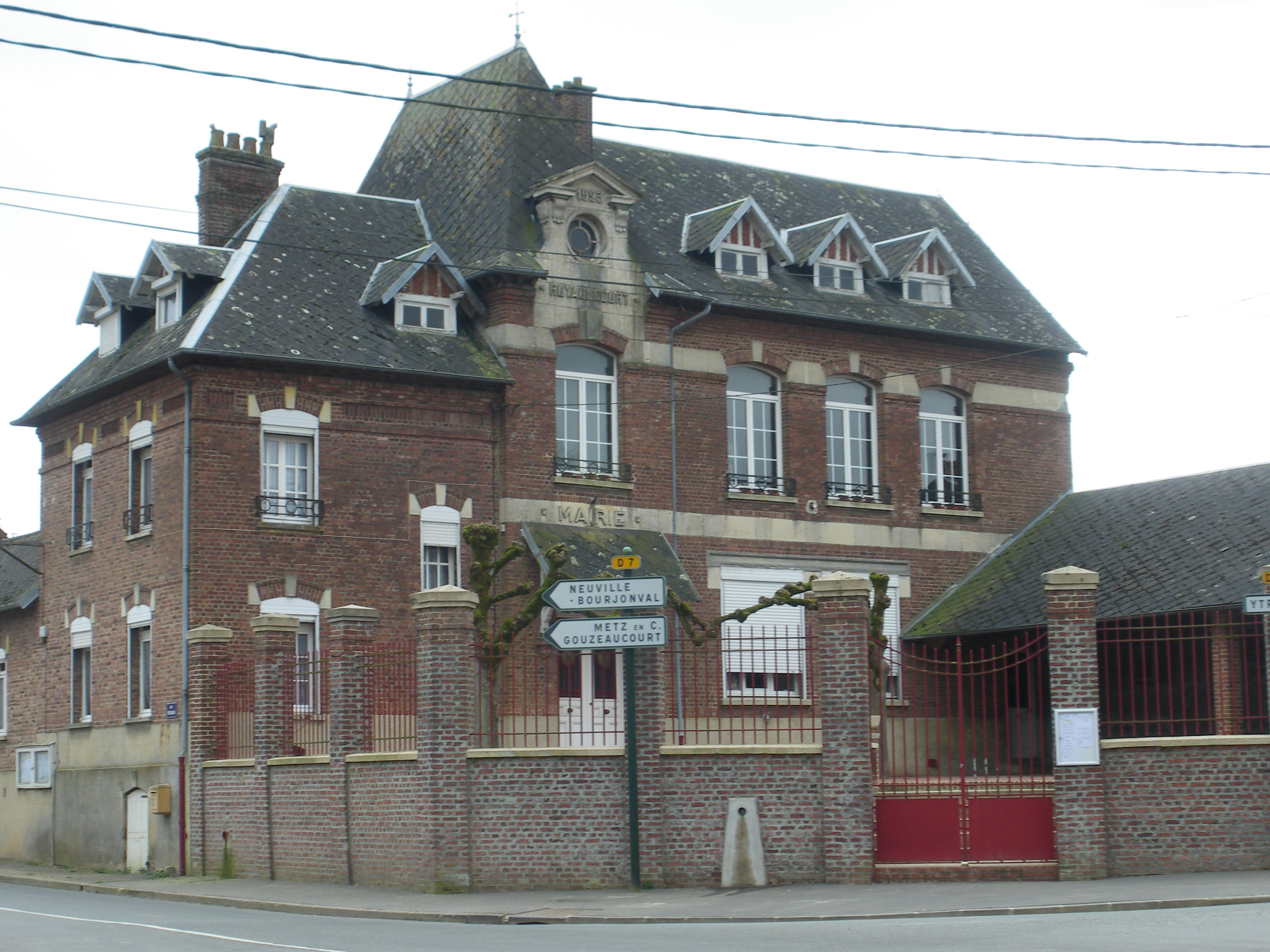
- The town hall of Ruyaulcourt

- Coat of arms
- Location of Ruyaulcourt
- Location within France Location within Hauts-de-France
- Coordinates: 50°05′01″N 3°00′50″E
- Country: France
- Region: Hauts-de-France
- Department: Pas-de-Calais
- Arrondissement: Arras
- Canton: Bapaume
- Intercommunality: CC Sud-Artois

Government
  - Mayor (2020–2026): Daniel Bédu
- Area^{1}: 6.4 km^{2} (2.5 sq mi)
- Elevation: 114 m (374 ft)
- Highest elevation: 132 m (433 ft)
- Lowest elevation: 90 m (300 ft)
- Population (2023): 285
  - Density: 45/km^{2} (120/sq mi)
- Time zone: UTC+01:00 (CET)
  - Summer (DST): UTC+02:00 (CEST)
- INSEE/Postal code: 62731 /62124
- ^{1} French Land Register data, which excludes lakes, ponds, glaciers > 1 km^{2} (0.386 sq mi or 247 acres) and river estuaries.

Ruyaulcourt (French pronunciation: [ʁɥijolkuʁ]; Picard: Riaucourt) is a commune in the Pas-de-Calais department in the Hauts-de-France region of France between the A2 motorway and the Canal du Nord, about 19 miles (31 km) southeast of Arras.

== Population ==
Historical population
Year	Pop.	±% p.a.
1968	376	—
1975	353	−0.90%
1982	323	−1.26%
1990	304	−0.75%
1999	295	−0.33%
2007	267	−1.24%
2012	301	+2.43%
2017	294	−0.47%
2023	285	−0.52%
Source: INSEE

== See also ==
- Communes of the Pas-de-Calais department
