= Beaulencourt =

- Commune
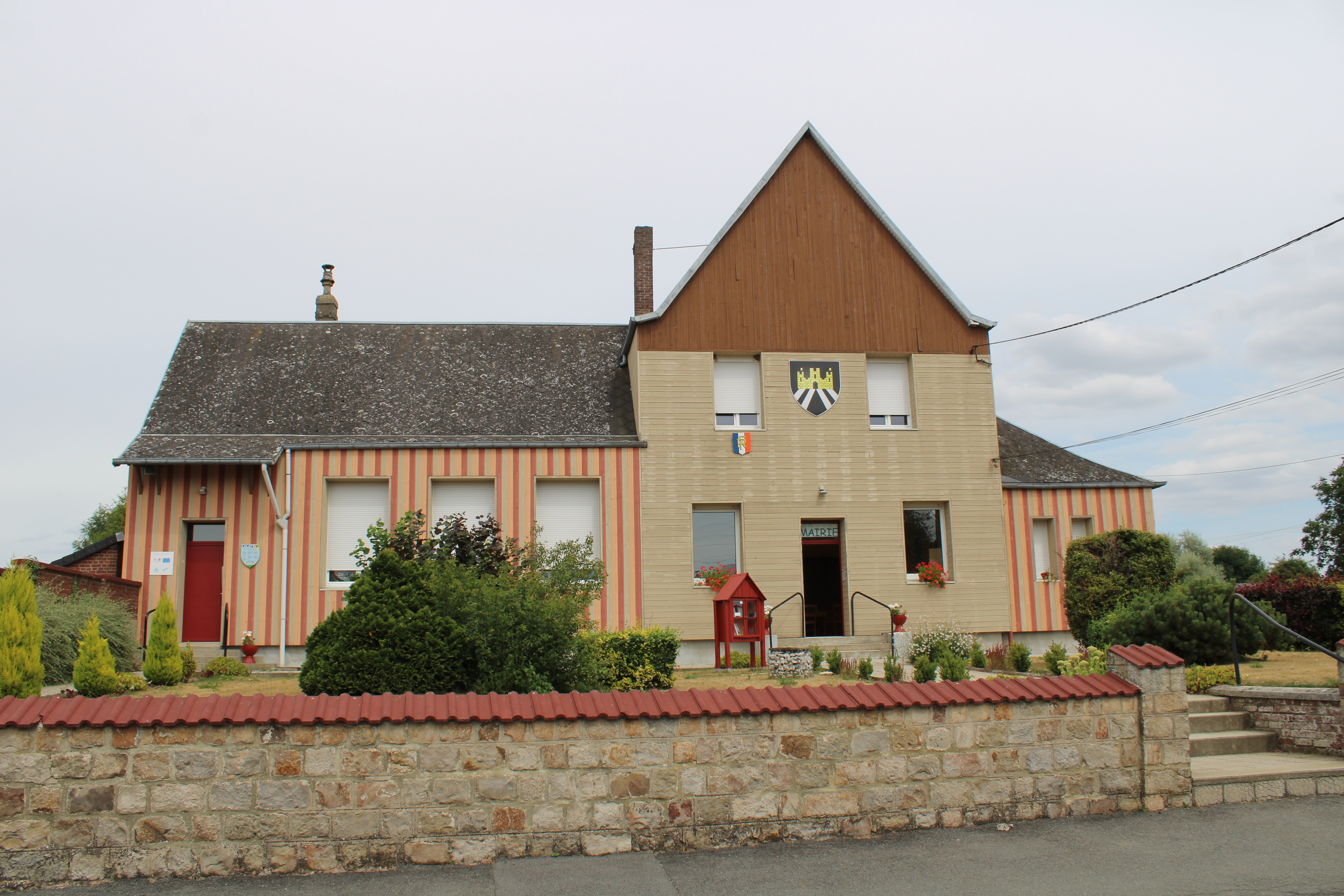
- The town hall of Beaulencourt

- Coat of arms
- Location of Beaulencourt
- Location within France Location within Hauts-de-France
- Coordinates: 50°04′36″N 2°52′46″E
- Country: France
- Region: Hauts-de-France
- Department: Pas-de-Calais
- Arrondissement: Arras
- Canton: Bapaume
- Intercommunality: CC du Sud-Artois

Government
  - Mayor (2020–2026): Édith Cottel
- Area^{1}: 4.9 km^{2} (1.9 sq mi)
- Elevation: 120 m (390 ft)
- Highest elevation: 131 m (430 ft)
- Lowest elevation: 107 m (351 ft)
- Population (2023): 241
  - Density: 49/km^{2} (130/sq mi)
- Time zone: UTC+01:00 (CET)
  - Summer (DST): UTC+02:00 (CEST)
- INSEE/Postal code: 62093 /62450
- ^{1} French Land Register data, which excludes lakes, ponds, glaciers > 1 km^{2} (0.386 sq mi or 247 acres) and river estuaries.

Beaulencourt (French pronunciation: [bolɑ̃kuʁ]) is a commune in the Pas-de-Calais department in the Hauts-de-France region in northern France.

== Geography ==
A small farming village located 20 miles (32 km) south of Arras on the N17 road, at the junction with the D11. The A1 autoroute passes by just yards from the commune.

== Population ==
Historical population
Year	Pop.	±% p.a.
1968	192	—
1975	175	−1.32%
1982	159	−1.36%
1990	175	+1.21%
1999	190	+0.92%
2007	202	+0.77%
2012	238	+3.33%
2017	235	−0.25%
2023	241	+0.42%
Source: INSEE

== Sights ==
- The church of Notre-Dame, dating from the twentieth century
- The Commonwealth War Graves Commission cemetery.

== See also ==
- Communes of the Pas-de-Calais department
