= Ligny-Thilloy =

- Commune
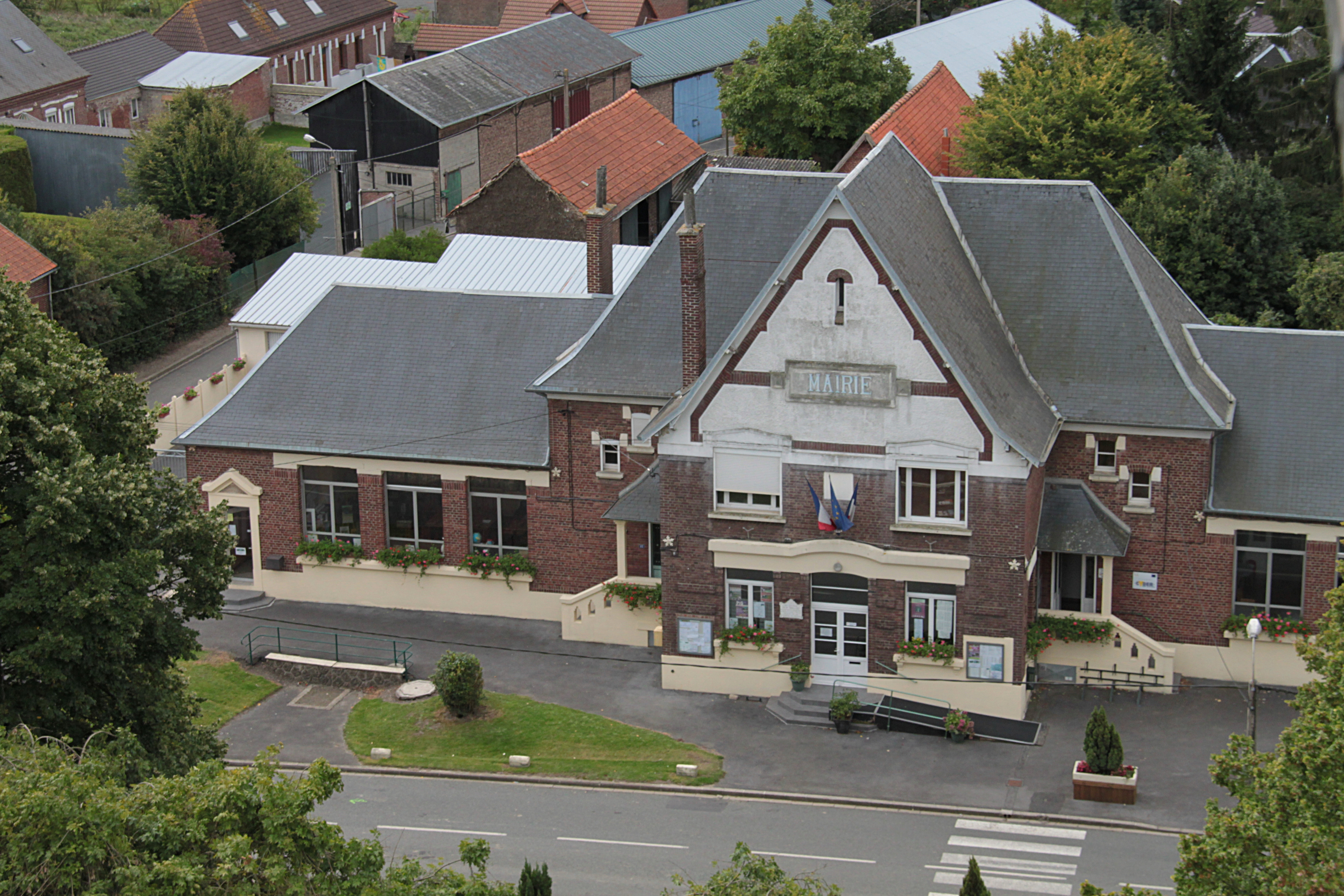
- The town hall of Ligny-Thilloy

- Coat of arms
- Location of Ligny-Thilloy
- Location within France Location within Hauts-de-France
- Coordinates: 50°05′06″N 2°49′34″E
- Country: France
- Region: Hauts-de-France
- Department: Pas-de-Calais
- Arrondissement: Arras
- Canton: Bapaume
- Intercommunality: Sud-Artois

Government
  - Mayor (2020–2026): Daniel Poret
- Area^{1}: 10.29 km^{2} (3.97 sq mi)
- Elevation: 111 m (364 ft)
- Highest elevation: 135 m (443 ft)
- Lowest elevation: 97 m (318 ft)
- Population (2023): 514
  - Density: 50.0/km^{2} (129/sq mi)
- Time zone: UTC+01:00 (CET)
  - Summer (DST): UTC+02:00 (CEST)
- INSEE/Postal code: 62515 /62450
- ^{1} French Land Register data, which excludes lakes, ponds, glaciers > 1 km^{2} (0.386 sq mi or 247 acres) and river estuaries.

Ligny-Thilloy (French pronunciation: [liɲi tilwa]; Picard: Ligny-Tiloé) is a commune in the Pas-de-Calais department in the Hauts-de-France region of France just southwest of Bapaume and 18 miles (29 km) south of Arras.

== Population ==
Historical population
| Year | Pop. | ±% p.a. |
|---|---|---|
| 1968 | 408 | — |
| 1975 | 374 | −1.24% |
| 1982 | 437 | +2.25% |
| 1990 | 518 | +2.15% |
| 1999 | 512 | −0.13% |
| 2007 | 548 | +0.85% |
| 2012 | 565 | +0.61% |
| 2017 | 532 | −1.20% |
| 2023 | 514 | −0.57% |
Source: INSEE

== See also ==
- Communes of the Pas-de-Calais department
