= Favreuil =

- Commune
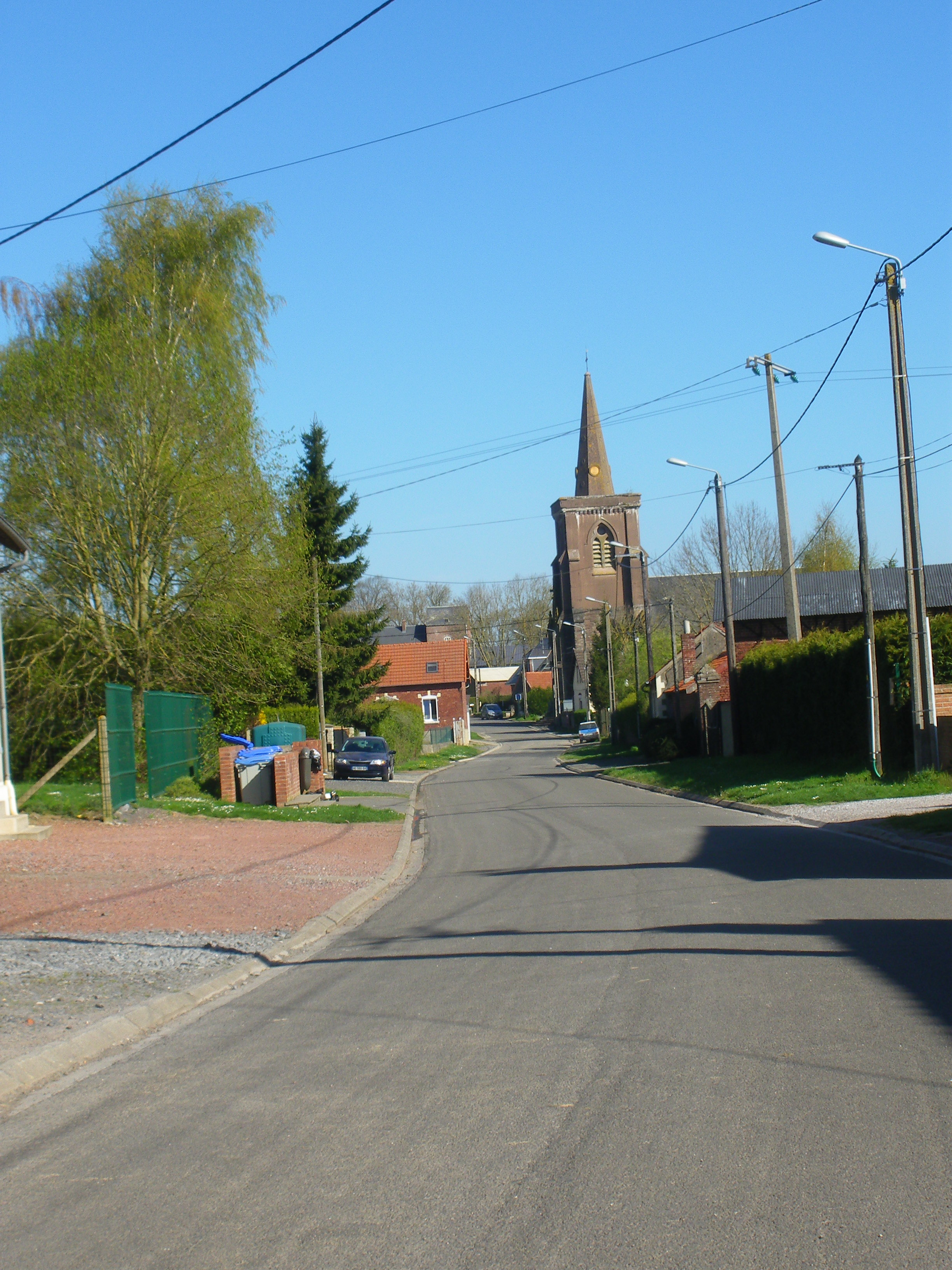
- A road in Favreuil

- Coat of arms
- Location of Favreuil
- Location within France Location within Hauts-de-France
- Coordinates: 50°07′30″N 2°51′28″E
- Country: France
- Region: Hauts-de-France
- Department: Pas-de-Calais
- Arrondissement: Arras
- Canton: Bapaume
- Intercommunality: CC Sud-Artois

Government
  - Mayor (2020–2026): Dorothée Legrand
- Area^{1}: 4.93 km^{2} (1.90 sq mi)
- Elevation: 110 m (360 ft)
- Highest elevation: 124 m (407 ft)
- Lowest elevation: 98 m (322 ft)
- Population (2023): 228
  - Density: 46.2/km^{2} (120/sq mi)
- Time zone: UTC+01:00 (CET)
  - Summer (DST): UTC+02:00 (CEST)
- INSEE/Postal code: 62326 /62450
- ^{1} French Land Register data, which excludes lakes, ponds, glaciers > 1 km^{2} (0.386 sq mi or 247 acres) and river estuaries.

Favreuil (French pronunciation: [favʁœj]) is a commune in the Pas-de-Calais department in the Hauts-de-France region of France 14 miles (23 km) south of Arras.

== Population ==
Historical population
Year	Pop.	±% p.a.
1968	162	—
1975	138	−2.26%
1982	180	+3.87%
1990	190	+0.68%
1999	242	+2.72%
2007	250	+0.41%
2012	241	−0.73%
2017	237	−0.33%
2023	228	−0.64%
Source: INSEE

== See also ==
- Communes of the Pas-de-Calais department
