= Haplincourt =

- Commune
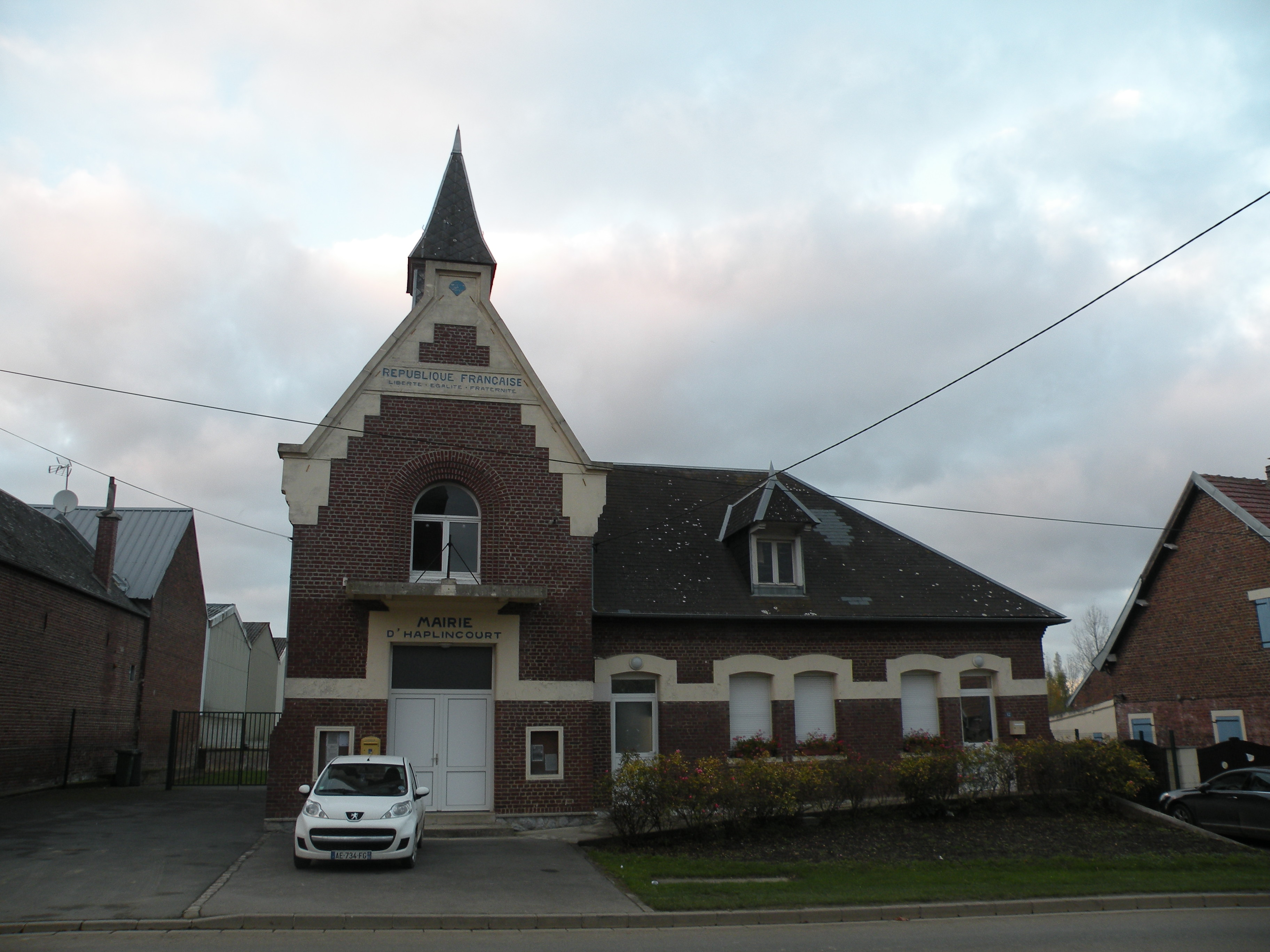
- The town hall of Haplincourt

- Coat of arms
- Location of Haplincourt
- Location within France Location within Hauts-de-France
- Coordinates: 50°05′27″N 2°55′56″E
- Country: France
- Region: Hauts-de-France
- Department: Pas-de-Calais
- Arrondissement: Arras
- Canton: Bapaume
- Intercommunality: CC Sud-Artois

Government
  - Mayor (2020–2026): Michel Flahaut
- Area^{1}: 5.11 km^{2} (1.97 sq mi)
- Elevation: 115 m (377 ft)
- Highest elevation: 128 m (420 ft)
- Lowest elevation: 103 m (338 ft)
- Population (2023): 191
  - Density: 37.4/km^{2} (96.8/sq mi)
- Time zone: UTC+01:00 (CET)
  - Summer (DST): UTC+02:00 (CEST)
- INSEE/Postal code: 62410 /62124
- ^{1} French Land Register data, which excludes lakes, ponds, glaciers > 1 km^{2} (0.386 sq mi or 247 acres) and river estuaries.

Haplincourt (French pronunciation: [aplɛ̃kuʁ]) is a commune in the Pas-de-Calais department in the Hauts-de-France region of France.

== Geography ==
A farming village situated 18 miles (29 km) southwest of Arras, at the junction of the D7 and the D20 roads.

== Population ==
Historical population
Year	Pop.	±% p.a.
1968	227	—
1975	187	−2.73%
1982	184	−0.23%
1990	180	−0.27%
1999	210	+1.73%
2007	197	−0.80%
2012	187	−1.04%
2017	184	−0.32%
2023	191	+0.62%
Source: INSEE

== Places of interest ==
- The church of St.Nicholas, rebuilt along with much of the village, after World War I.

== See also ==
- Communes of the Pas-de-Calais department
