= Riencourt-lès-Bapaume =

- Commune
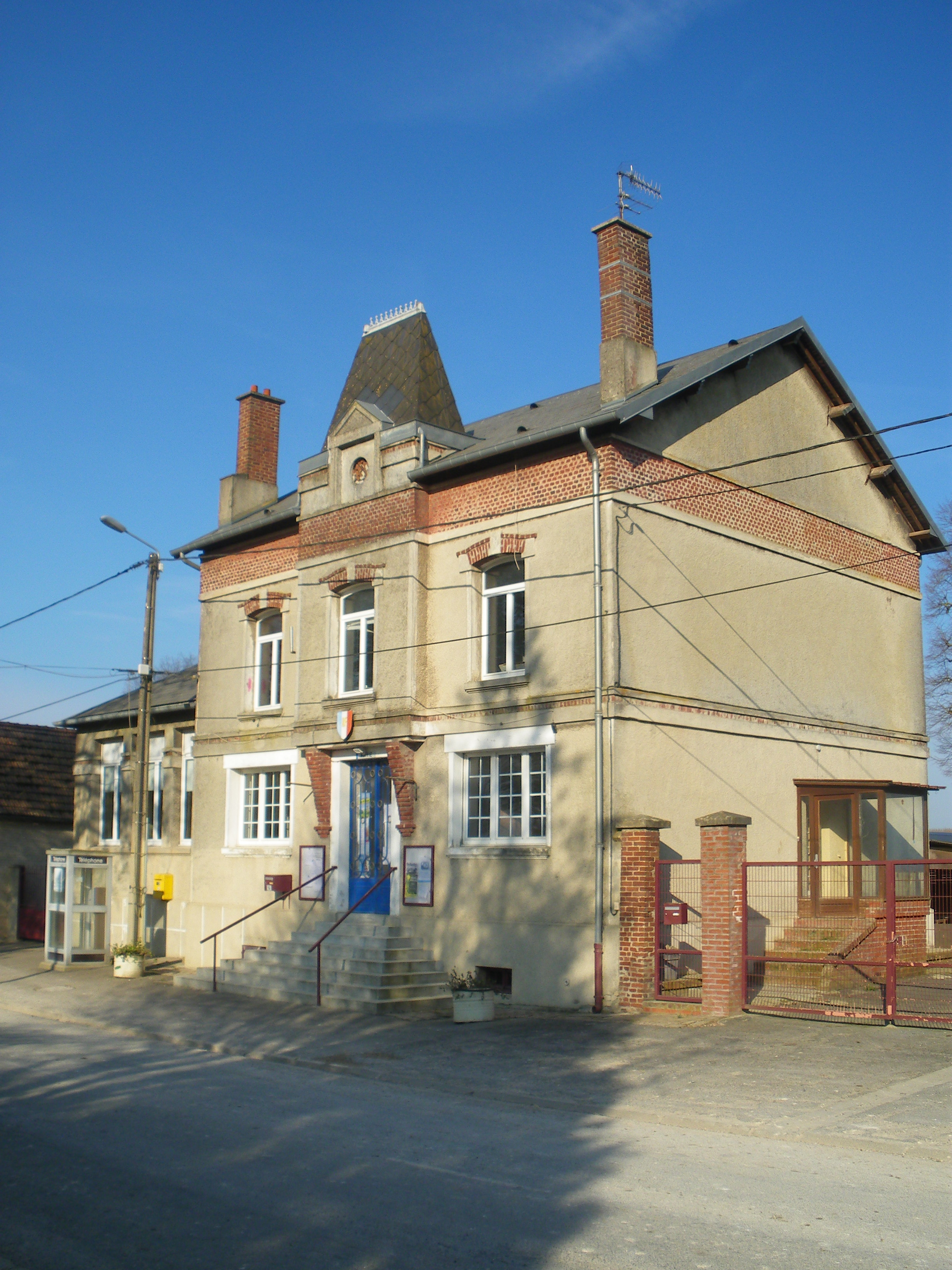
- The town hall of Riencourt-lès-Bapaume

- Coat of arms
- Location of Riencourt-lès-Bapaume
- Location within France Location within Hauts-de-France
- Coordinates: 50°05′21″N 2°52′57″E
- Country: France
- Region: Hauts-de-France
- Department: Pas-de-Calais
- Arrondissement: Arras
- Canton: Bapaume
- Intercommunality: CC Sud-Artois

Government
  - Mayor (2020–2026): Jean-Luc Descamps
- Area^{1}: 3.41 km^{2} (1.32 sq mi)
- Elevation: 135 m (443 ft)
- Highest elevation: 132 m (433 ft)
- Lowest elevation: 113 m (371 ft)
- Population (2023): 33
  - Density: 9.7/km^{2} (25/sq mi)
- Time zone: UTC+01:00 (CET)
  - Summer (DST): UTC+02:00 (CEST)
- INSEE/Postal code: 62708 /62450
- ^{1} French Land Register data, which excludes lakes, ponds, glaciers > 1 km^{2} (0.386 sq mi or 247 acres) and river estuaries.

Riencourt-lès-Bapaume (French pronunciation: [ʁjɛ̃kuʁ lɛ bapom], literally Riencourt near Bapaume) is a commune in the Pas-de-Calais department in the Hauts-de-France region of France 19 miles (31 km) south of Arras.

== Population ==
Historical population
| Year | Pop. | ±% p.a. |
|---|---|---|
| 1968 | 42 | — |
| 1975 | 39 | −1.05% |
| 1982 | 43 | +1.40% |
| 1990 | 29 | −4.80% |
| 1999 | 25 | −1.64% |
| 2007 | 33 | +3.53% |
| 2012 | 38 | +2.86% |
| 2017 | 35 | −1.63% |
| 2023 | 33 | −0.98% |
Source: INSEE

== See also ==
- Communes of the Pas-de-Calais department
