= Ytres =

- Commune
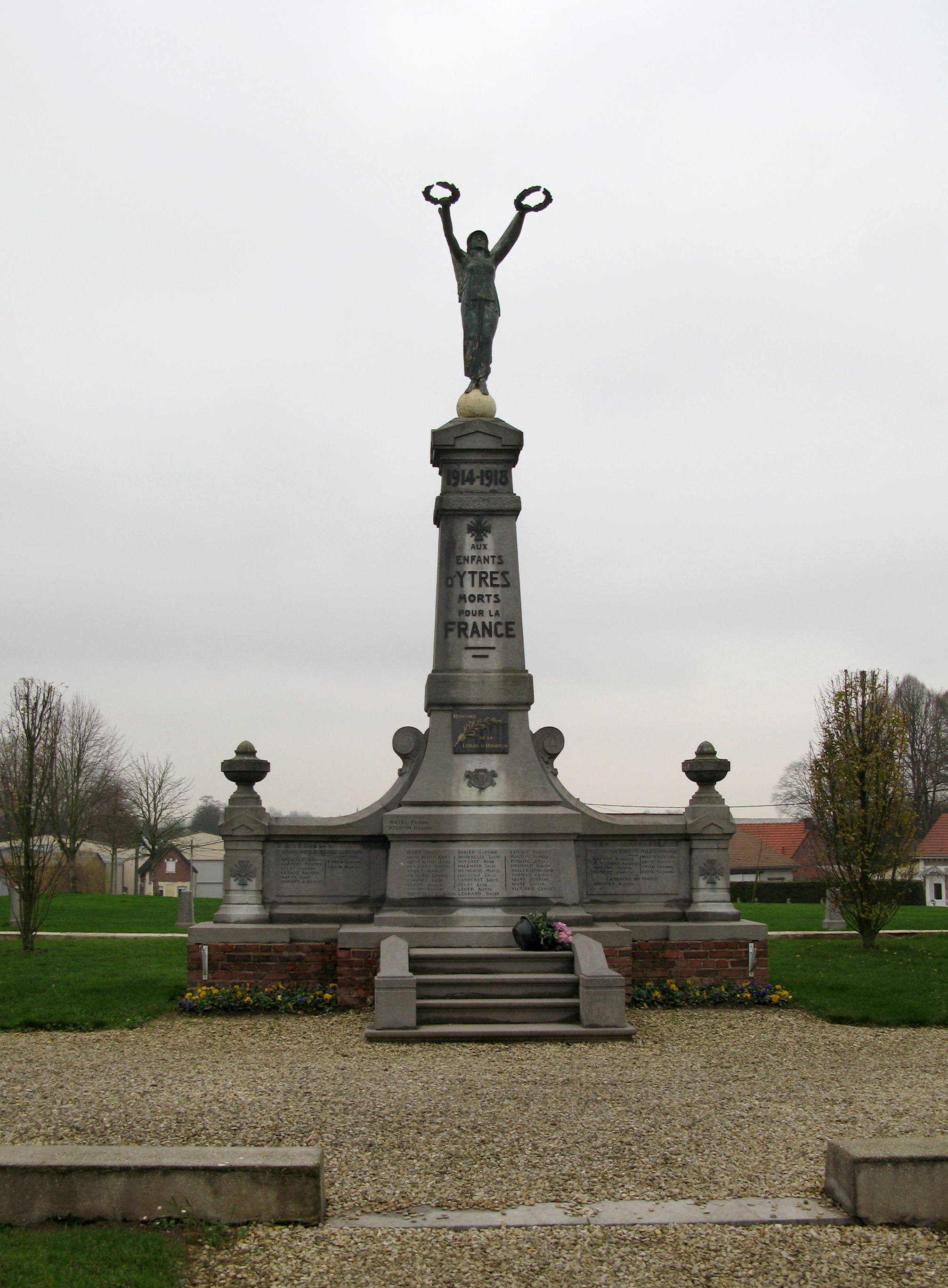
- The monument to the dead of Ytres
- Location of Ytres
- Location within France Location within Hauts-de-France
- Coordinates: 50°03′56″N 2°59′37″E
- Country: France
- Region: Hauts-de-France
- Department: Pas-de-Calais
- Arrondissement: Arras
- Canton: Bapaume
- Intercommunality: Sud-Artois

Government
  - Mayor (2020–2026): André-Marie Lecat
- Area^{1}: 4.26 km^{2} (1.64 sq mi)
- Elevation: 120 m (390 ft)
- Highest elevation: 133 m (436 ft)
- Lowest elevation: 94 m (308 ft)
- Population (2023): 425
  - Density: 99.8/km^{2} (258/sq mi)
- Time zone: UTC+01:00 (CET)
  - Summer (DST): UTC+02:00 (CEST)
- INSEE/Postal code: 62909 /62124
- ^{1} French Land Register data, which excludes lakes, ponds, glaciers > 1 km^{2} (0.386 sq mi or 247 acres) and river estuaries.

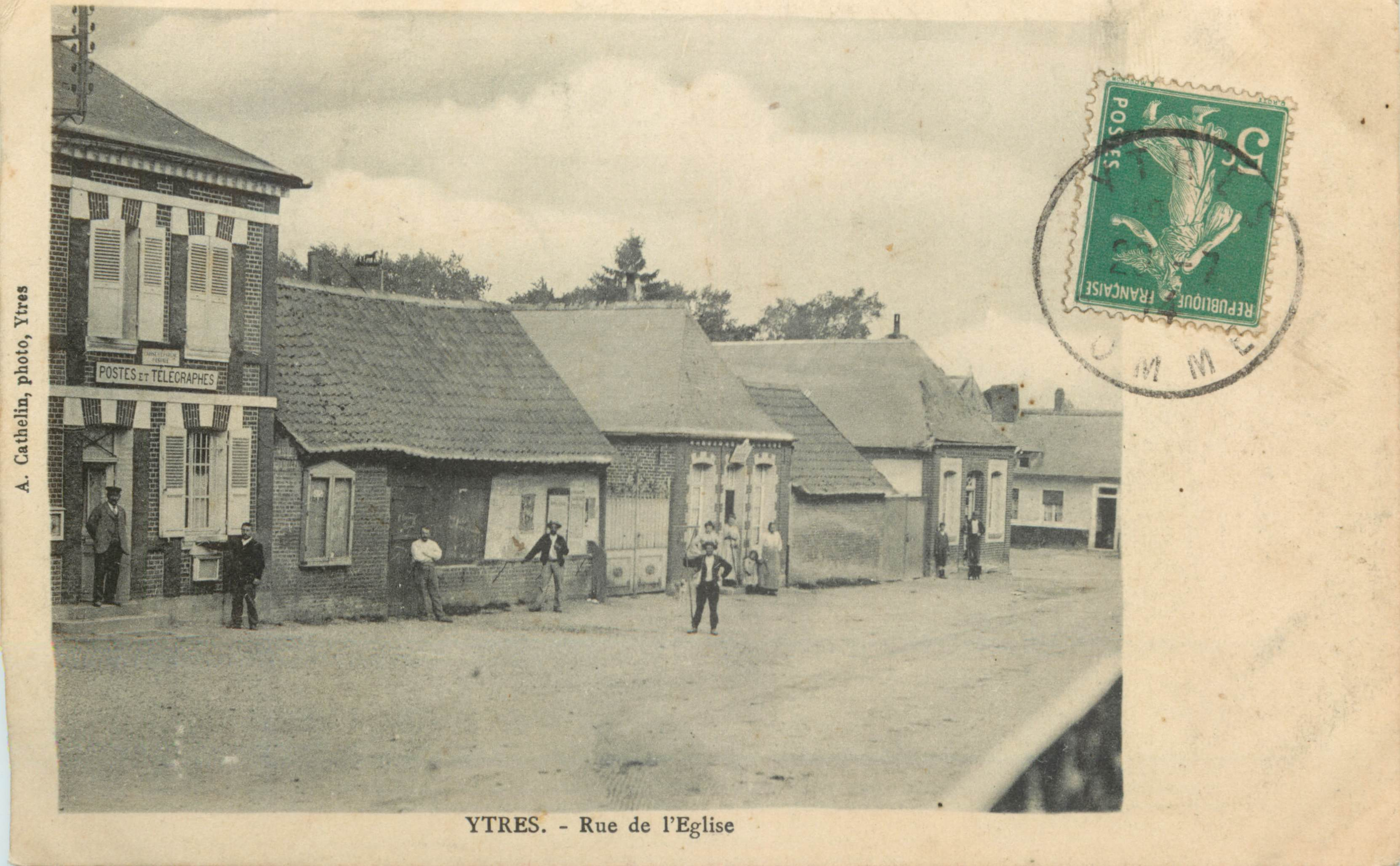
Rue de l’Eglise, Ytres, France (1914 postcard)

Ytres (French pronunciation: [itʁ]; Picard: Ite) is a commune in the Pas-de-Calais department in the Hauts-de-France region of France.

== Geography and History ==
Ytres is a farming village situated in the heart of the Pas-de-Calais department in northern France. Located 20 miles (32 km) southeast of Arras, the village is a popular tourist destination. The village is located at the junction of three main roads, namely the D7, D19, and D18E roads, which provide access to nearby towns and villages.

Ytres has a rich history that dates back to the early 14th century. During the Hundred Years' War, the village was an important stronghold for the French army, and it played a crucial role in the Battle of Crecy in 1346. However, Ytres is known for its role in World War I, when it was completely destroyed during the Battle of the Somme in 1916.

Despite the devastation wrought upon the village during the war, Ytres was rebuilt and restored in the years that followed. Many of its buildings date back to the 18th and 19th centuries.

Ytres is located near the A2 autoroute, which passes by to the north of the commune. This major highway provides access to the village from nearby cities like Lille and Paris.

Another notable feature of Ytres is its location along the Canal du Nord, a major shipping canal that was built between 1911 and 1914. The canal passes by to the south of the village, and it is a popular spot for boating and fishing enthusiasts.

The village's museum, located in the town hall, houses a collection of artifacts and documents related to the village's history.

Ytres is also home to several churches and chapels. The Église Saint-Martin, located in the heart of the village, is an example of Gothic architecture and features intricate stained glass windows and a bell tower. The Chapelle Sainte-Barbe, located just outside the village, is a smaller chapel that dates back to the 16th century and is known for its ornate carvings and frescoes.

== Population ==
Historical population
Year	Pop.	±% p.a.
1968	442	—
1975	396	−1.56%
1982	354	−1.59%
1990	361	+0.25%
1999	393	+0.95%
2007	417	+0.74%
2012	437	+0.94%
2017	435	−0.09%
2023	425	−0.39%
Source: INSEE

== See also ==
- Communes of the Pas-de-Calais department
