= Metz-en-Couture =

- Commune
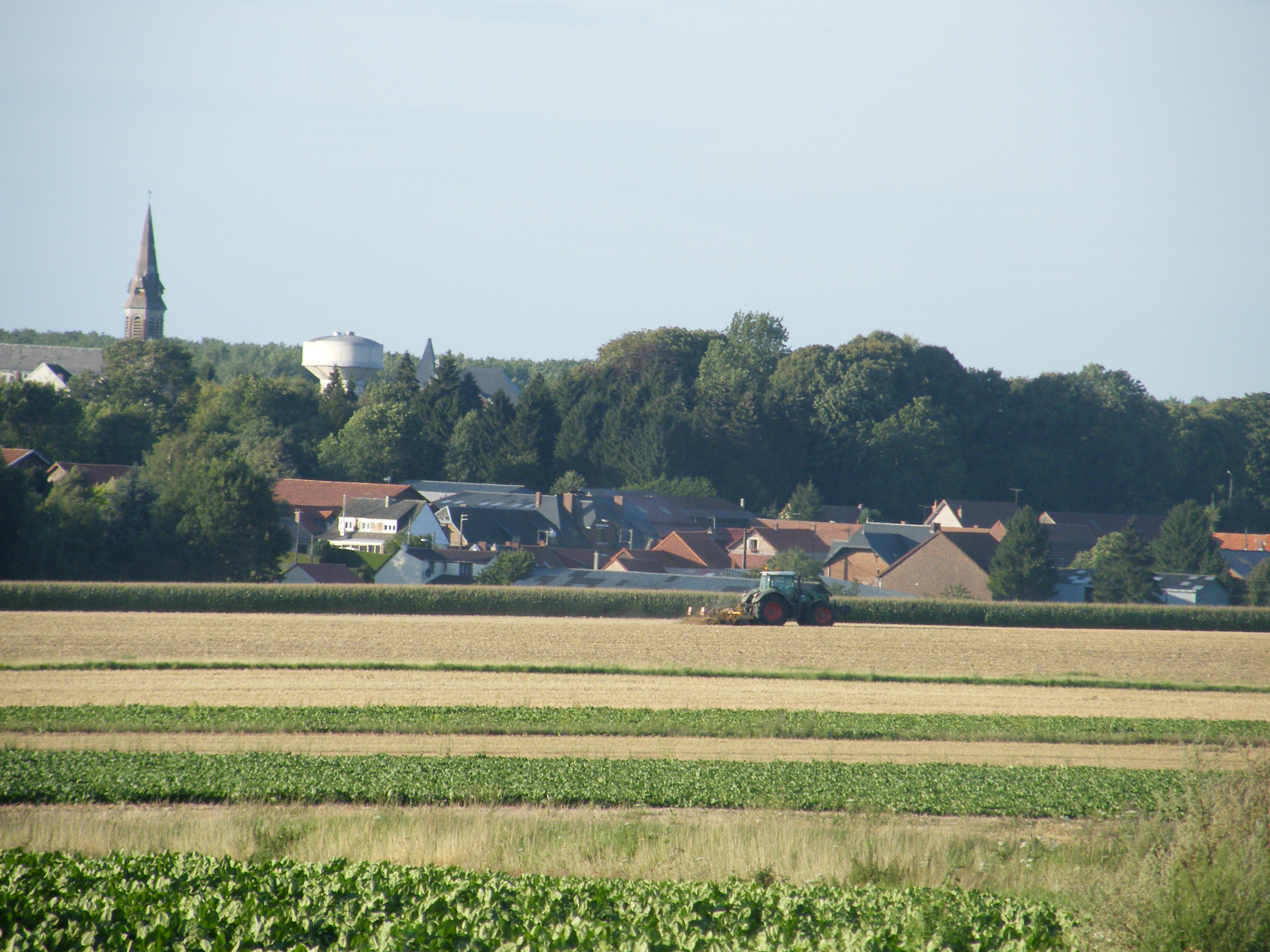
- View of Metz-en-Couture from the fields

- Coat of arms
- Location of Metz-en-Couture
- Location within France Location within Hauts-de-France
- Coordinates: 50°04′06″N 3°03′52″E
- Country: France
- Region: Hauts-de-France
- Department: Pas-de-Calais
- Arrondissement: Arras
- Canton: Bapaume
- Intercommunality: CC Sud-Artois

Government
  - Mayor (2020–2026): Michel Lalisse
- Area^{1}: 10.73 km^{2} (4.14 sq mi)
- Elevation: 136 m (446 ft)
- Highest elevation: 134 m (440 ft)
- Lowest elevation: 90 m (300 ft)
- Population (2023): 620
  - Density: 58/km^{2} (150/sq mi)
- Time zone: UTC+01:00 (CET)
  - Summer (DST): UTC+02:00 (CEST)
- INSEE/Postal code: 62572 /62124
- ^{1} French Land Register data, which excludes lakes, ponds, glaciers > 1 km^{2} (0.386 sq mi or 247 acres) and river estuaries.

Metz-en-Couture is a commune in the Pas-de-Calais department in the Hauts-de-France region of France 25 miles (40 km) southeast of Arras.

== Population ==
Historical population
Year	Pop.	±% p.a.
1968	714	—
1975	647	−1.40%
1982	575	−1.67%
1990	605	+0.64%
1999	602	−0.06%
2007	628	+0.53%
2012	655	+0.85%
2017	664	+0.27%
2023	620	−1.14%
Source: INSEE

== See also ==
- Communes of the Pas-de-Calais department
