= Beugnâtre =

- Commune
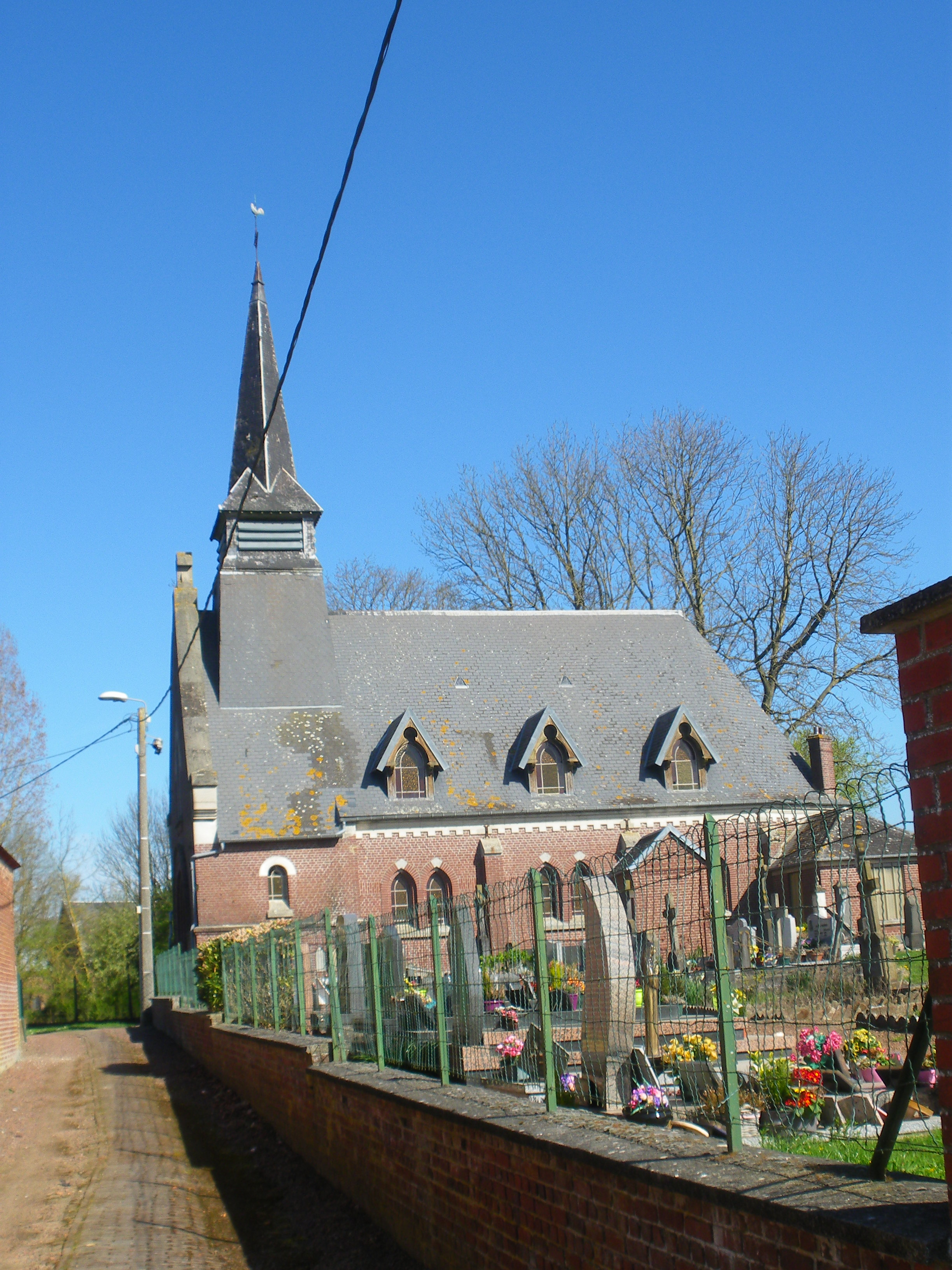
- The church of Beugnâtre

- Coat of arms
- Location of Beugnâtre
- Location within France Location within Hauts-de-France
- Coordinates: 50°07′49″N 2°52′35″E
- Country: France
- Region: Hauts-de-France
- Department: Pas-de-Calais
- Arrondissement: Arras
- Canton: Bapaume
- Intercommunality: CC du Sud-Artois

Government
  - Mayor (2020–2026): Jacques Weexsteen
- Area^{1}: 3.97 km^{2} (1.53 sq mi)
- Elevation: 119 m (390 ft)
- Highest elevation: 117 m (384 ft)
- Lowest elevation: 98 m (322 ft)
- Population (2023): 180
  - Density: 45/km^{2} (120/sq mi)
- Time zone: UTC+01:00 (CET)
  - Summer (DST): UTC+02:00 (CEST)
- INSEE/Postal code: 62121 /62450
- ^{1} French Land Register data, which excludes lakes, ponds, glaciers > 1 km^{2} (0.386 sq mi or 247 acres) and river estuaries.

Beugnâtre (French pronunciation: [bœɲatʁ]) is a commune in the Pas-de-Calais department in the Hauts-de-France region in northern France.

== Geography ==
A small farming village located 15 miles (24 km) southeast of Arras at the junction of the D956 and D10E roads. The A1 autoroute passes by just yards from the commune.

Beugnâtre is a rural commune in the Pas-de-Calais department of the Hauts-de-France region in northern France. It forms part of the Arras arrondissement and belongs to the intercommunality of the Communauté de communes du Sud-Artois. The commune is situated in an agricultural landscape characteristic of the Artois plateau, with predominantly open-field farming. During the First World War, Beugnâtre was heavily damaged due to its proximity to the Western Front, and much of the village was reconstructed in the interwar period. Today, it remains a small residential and farming community with local governance typical of French rural communes.

== Population ==
Historical population
Year	Pop.	±% p.a.
1968	109	—
1975	103	−0.81%
1982	97	−0.85%
1990	101	+0.51%
1999	123	+2.21%
2007	129	+0.60%
2012	148	+2.79%
2017	170	+2.81%
2023	180	+0.96%
Source: INSEE

== Sights ==
- The church of St. Leger, rebuilt, like most of the village, after the ravages of World War I.

== See also ==
- Communes of the Pas-de-Calais department
