= Biefvillers-lès-Bapaume =

- Commune
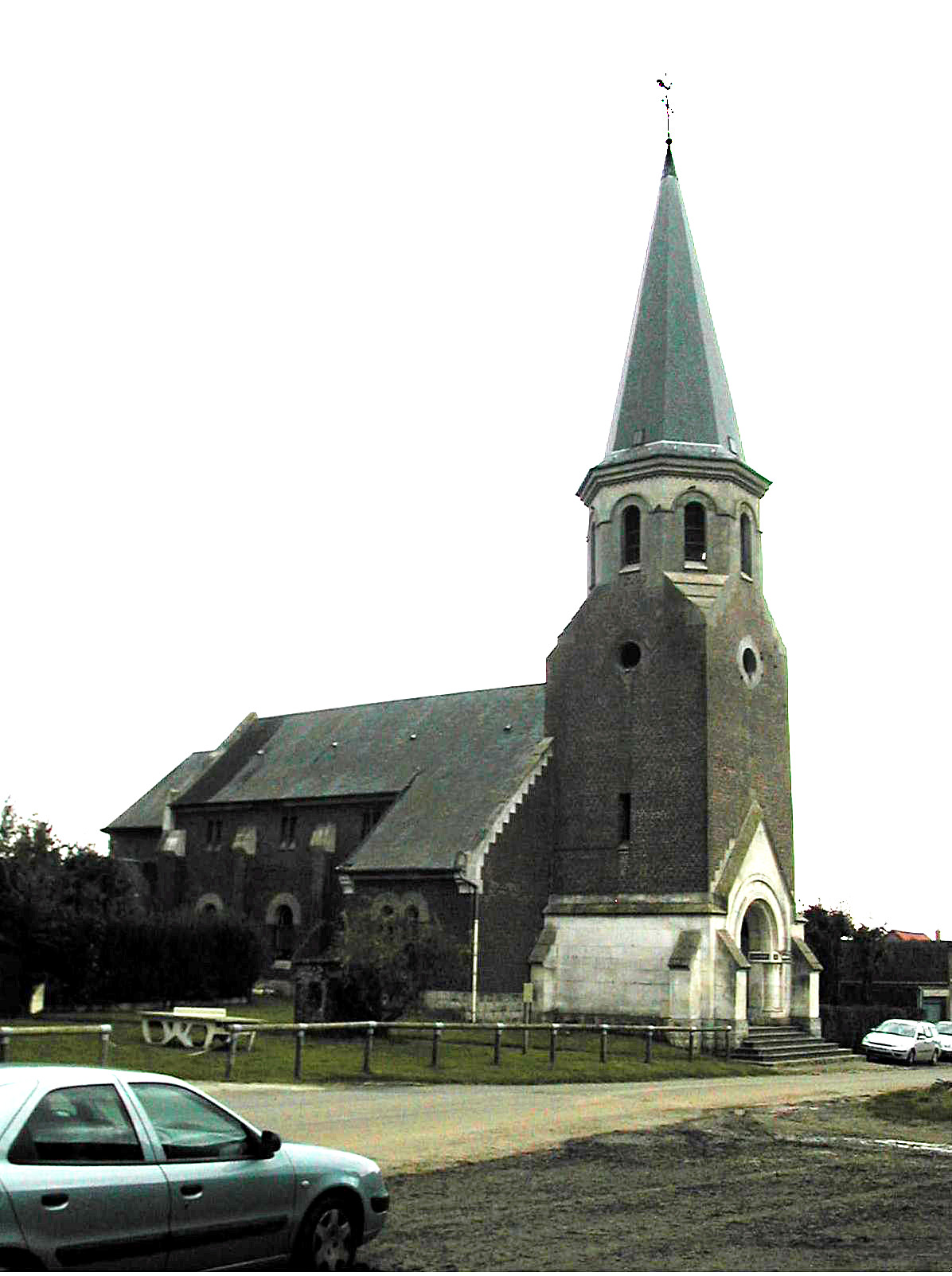
- The church of Biefvillers-lès-Bapaume

- Coat of arms
- Location of Biefvillers-lès-Bapaume
- Location within France Location within Hauts-de-France
- Coordinates: 50°06′57″N 2°49′28″E
- Country: France
- Region: Hauts-de-France
- Department: Pas-de-Calais
- Arrondissement: Arras
- Canton: Bapaume
- Intercommunality: CC du Sud-Artois

Government
  - Mayor (2020–2026): Véronique Thiébaut
- Area^{1}: 4.04 km^{2} (1.56 sq mi)
- Elevation: 122 m (400 ft)
- Highest elevation: 128 m (420 ft)
- Lowest elevation: 102 m (335 ft)
- Population (2023): 93
  - Density: 23/km^{2} (60/sq mi)
- Time zone: UTC+01:00 (CET)
  - Summer (DST): UTC+02:00 (CEST)
- INSEE/Postal code: 62129 /62450
- ^{1} French Land Register data, which excludes lakes, ponds, glaciers > 1 km^{2} (0.386 sq mi or 247 acres) and river estuaries.

Biefvillers-lès-Bapaume is a commune in the Pas-de-Calais department in the Hauts-de-France region in northern France.

== Geography ==
Biefvillers-lès-Bapaume is a small farming village located just outside Bapaume and 12 miles (19 km) south of Arras. It was within the theatre of operations of the Battle of Bapaume, during the Franco-Prussian War.

== Population ==
Historical population
Year	Pop.	±% p.a.
1968	113	—
1975	88	−3.51%
1982	90	+0.32%
1990	86	−0.57%
1999	82	−0.53%
2007	100	+2.51%
2012	100	+0.00%
2017	94	−1.23%
2023	93	−0.18%
Source: INSEE

== Sights ==
- The church of St. Vaast, rebuilt, as was much of the village, after the ravages of World War I.

== See also ==
- Communes of the Pas-de-Calais department
