= Sapignies =

- Commune
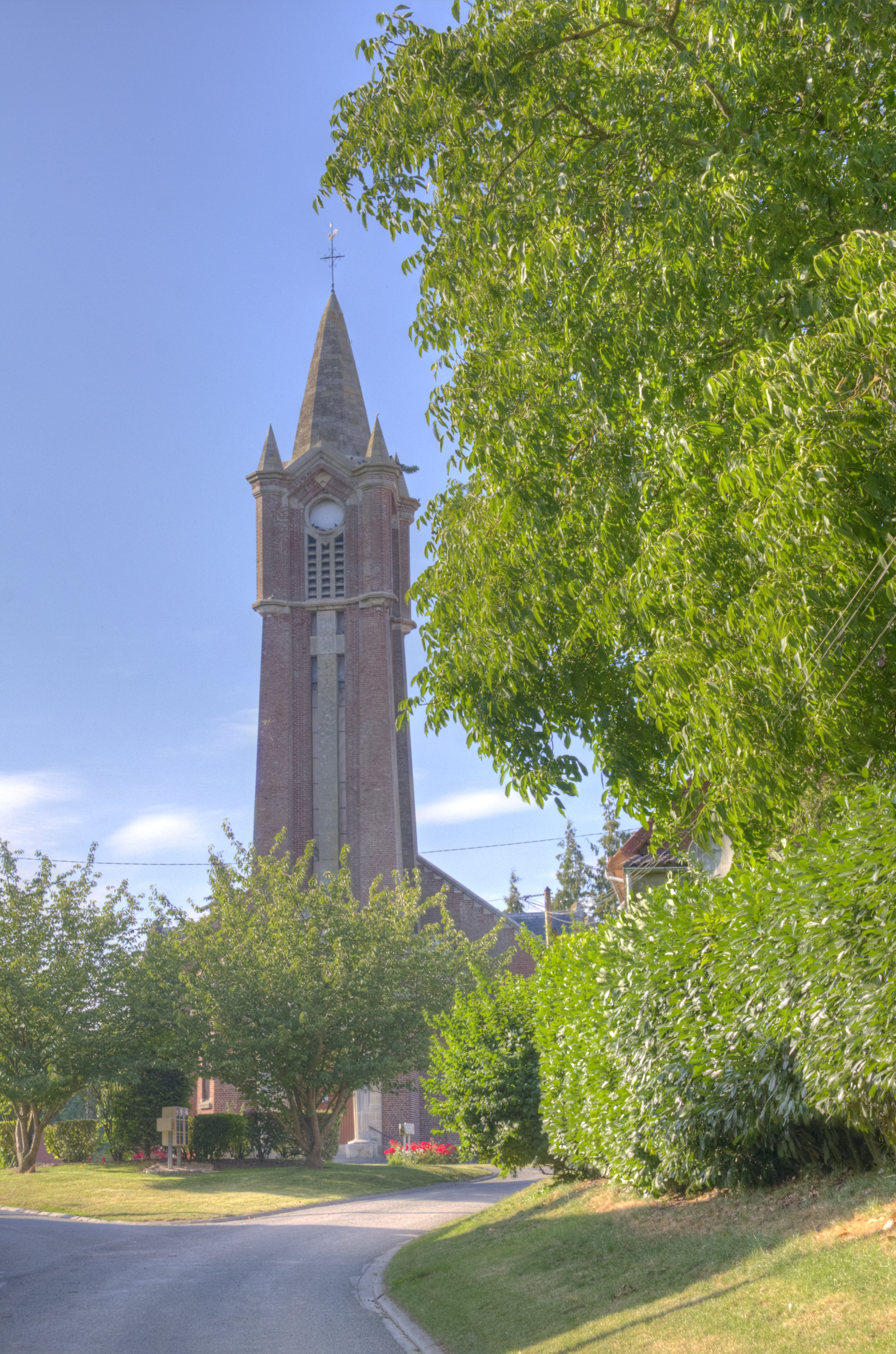
- The church of Sapignies

- Coat of arms
- Location of Sapignies
- Location within France Location within Hauts-de-France
- Coordinates: 50°08′05″N 2°50′09″E
- Country: France
- Region: Hauts-de-France
- Department: Pas-de-Calais
- Arrondissement: Arras
- Canton: Bapaume
- Intercommunality: CC Sud-Artois

Government
  - Mayor (2020–2026): Anne-Sophie Delauttre
- Area^{1}: 3.33 km^{2} (1.29 sq mi)
- Elevation: 121 m (397 ft)
- Highest elevation: 123 m (404 ft)
- Lowest elevation: 100 m (330 ft)
- Population (2023): 198
  - Density: 59.5/km^{2} (154/sq mi)
- Time zone: UTC+01:00 (CET)
  - Summer (DST): UTC+02:00 (CEST)
- INSEE/Postal code: 62776 /62121
- ^{1} French Land Register data, which excludes lakes, ponds, glaciers > 1 km^{2} (0.386 sq mi or 247 acres) and river estuaries.

Sapignies (French pronunciation: [sapiɲi]) is a commune in the Pas-de-Calais department in the Hauts-de-France region of France 14 miles (23 km) south of Arras.

== Population ==
Historical population
Year	Pop.	±% p.a.
1968	147	—
1975	140	−0.69%
1982	113	−3.01%
1990	137	+2.44%
1999	140	+0.24%
2007	196	+4.30%
2012	180	−1.69%
2017	196	+1.72%
2023	198	+0.17%
Source: INSEE

== See also ==
- Communes of the Pas-de-Calais department
