= Trescault =

- Commune
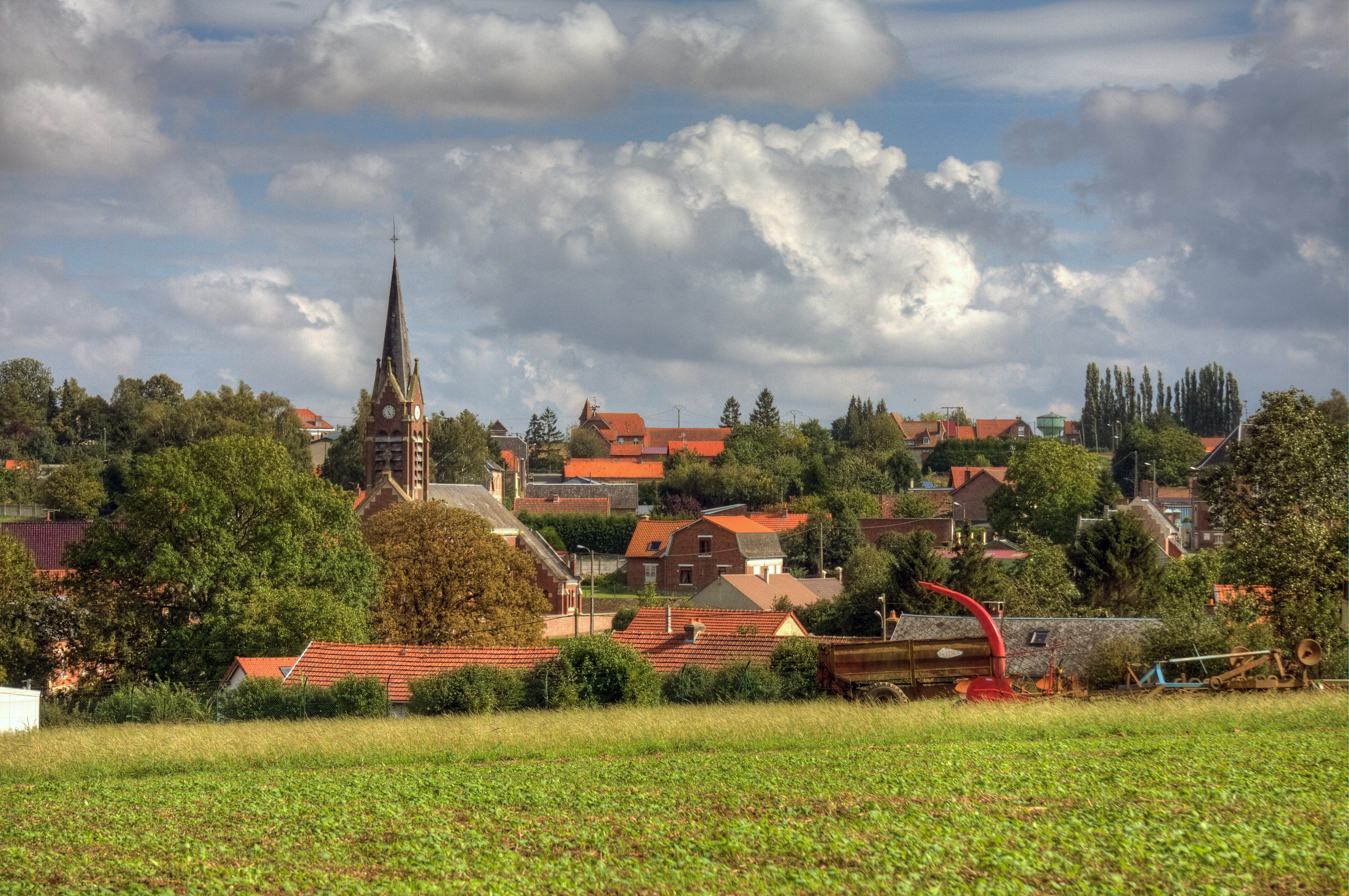
- A general view of Trescault

- Coat of arms
- Location of Trescault
- Location within France Location within Hauts-de-France
- Coordinates: 50°05′27″N 3°05′35″E
- Country: France
- Region: Hauts-de-France
- Department: Pas-de-Calais
- Arrondissement: Arras
- Canton: Bapaume
- Intercommunality: CC Sud-Artois

Government
  - Mayor (2020–2026): Christophe Dambrine
- Area^{1}: 4.67 km^{2} (1.80 sq mi)
- Elevation: 103 m (338 ft)
- Highest elevation: 127 m (417 ft)
- Lowest elevation: 70 m (230 ft)
- Population (2023): 204
  - Density: 43.7/km^{2} (113/sq mi)
- Time zone: UTC+01:00 (CET)
  - Summer (DST): UTC+02:00 (CEST)
- INSEE/Postal code: 62830 /62147
- ^{1} French Land Register data, which excludes lakes, ponds, glaciers > 1 km^{2} (0.386 sq mi or 247 acres) and river estuaries.

Trescault is a commune in the Pas-de-Calais department in the Hauts-de-France region of France.

== Geography ==
Trescault is surrounded by the forest of Havrincourt, 24 miles (39 km) southeast of Arras, at the junction of the D17 and D15 roads and on the border with the department of Nord.

== Population ==
Historical population
Year	Pop.	±% p.a.
1968	244	—
1975	234	−0.60%
1982	208	−1.67%
1990	198	−0.61%
1999	188	−0.57%
2007	185	−0.20%
2012	190	+0.53%
2017	178	−1.30%
2023	204	+2.30%
Source: INSEE

== Places of interest ==
- The church of St. Martin, rebuilt, as with much of the village, after the First World War.
- The Commonwealth War Graves Commission cemeteries.

== See also ==
- Communes of the Pas-de-Calais department
