= Beaumetz-lès-Cambrai =

- Commune
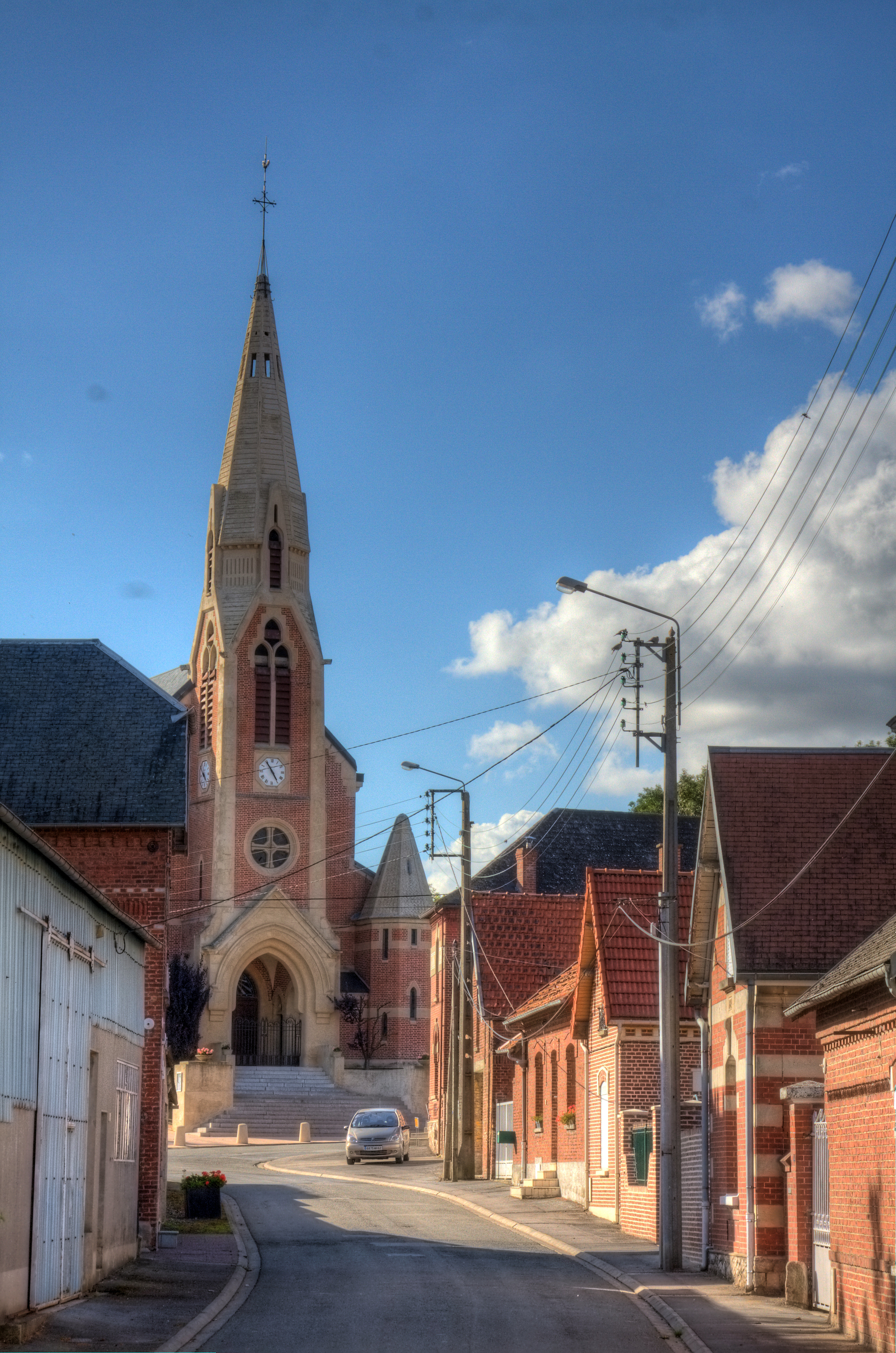
- The church of Beaumetz-lès-Cambrai

- Coat of arms
- Location of Beaumetz-lès-Cambrai
- Location within France Location within Hauts-de-France
- Coordinates: 50°07′21″N 2°59′05″E
- Country: France
- Region: Hauts-de-France
- Department: Pas-de-Calais
- Arrondissement: Arras
- Canton: Bapaume
- Intercommunality: CC du Sud-Artois

Government
  - Mayor (2020–2026): Yannick Membre
- Area^{1}: 9.91 km^{2} (3.83 sq mi)
- Elevation: 121 m (397 ft)
- Highest elevation: 123 m (404 ft)
- Lowest elevation: 79 m (259 ft)
- Population (2023): 528
  - Density: 53.3/km^{2} (138/sq mi)
- Time zone: UTC+01:00 (CET)
  - Summer (DST): UTC+02:00 (CEST)
- INSEE/Postal code: 62096 /62124
- ^{1} French Land Register data, which excludes lakes, ponds, glaciers > 1 km^{2} (0.386 sq mi or 247 acres) and river estuaries.

Beaumetz-lès-Cambrai (French pronunciation: [bome lɛ kɑ̃bʁɛ], literally Beaumetz near Cambrai; Picard: Biaumés-lès-Kimbré) is a commune in the Pas-de-Calais department in the Hauts-de-France region in northern France.

== Geography ==
A farming village located 24 km (15 mi) southeast of Arras and 19 km (12 mi) southwest of Cambrai on the D18E road.

== Population ==
Historical population
Year	Pop.	±% p.a.
1968	566	—
1975	536	−0.77%
1982	482	−1.51%
1990	516	+0.86%
1999	541	+0.53%
2007	525	−0.37%
2012	610	+3.05%
2017	581	−0.97%
2023	528	−1.58%
Source: INSEE

== Sights ==
- The church of St. Géri, rebuilt, like most of the village, after 1918.
- Vestiges of an old castle.
- Two World War I cemeteries.

== See also ==
- Communes of the Pas-de-Calais department
