= Lebucquière =

- Commune
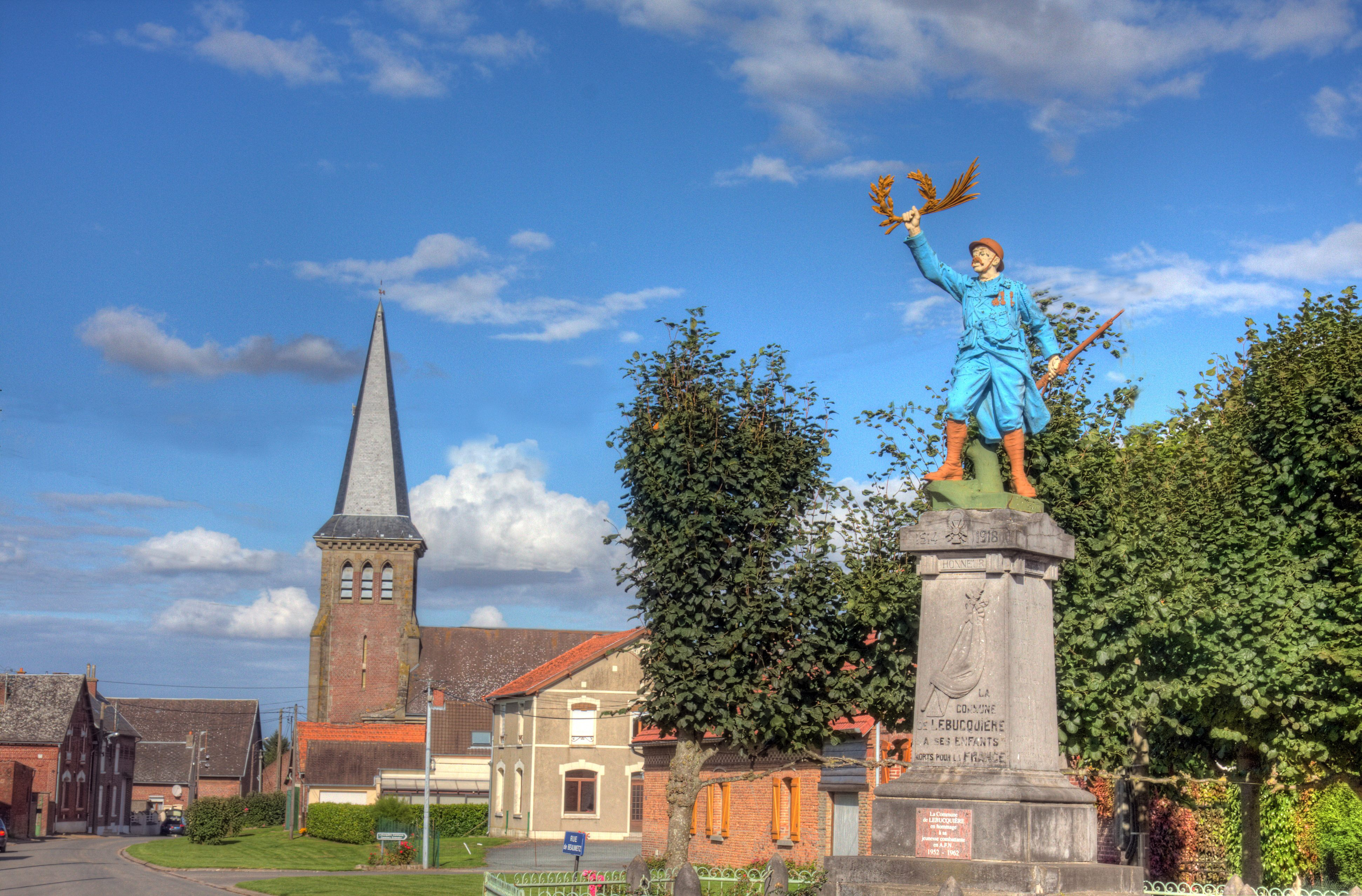
- The church and monument to the dead of Lebucquière

- Coat of arms
- Location of Lebucquière
- Location within France Location within Hauts-de-France
- Coordinates: 50°06′47″N 2°58′01″E
- Country: France
- Region: Hauts-de-France
- Department: Pas-de-Calais
- Arrondissement: Arras
- Canton: Bapaume
- Intercommunality: CC Sud-Artois

Government
  - Mayor (2020–2026): Bruno Hiez
- Area^{1}: 4.75 km^{2} (1.83 sq mi)
- Elevation: 112 m (367 ft)
- Highest elevation: 127 m (417 ft)
- Lowest elevation: 101 m (331 ft)
- Population (2023): 232
  - Density: 48.8/km^{2} (127/sq mi)
- Time zone: UTC+01:00 (CET)
  - Summer (DST): UTC+02:00 (CEST)
- INSEE/Postal code: 62493 /62124
- ^{1} French Land Register data, which excludes lakes, ponds, glaciers > 1 km^{2} (0.386 sq mi or 247 acres) and river estuaries.

Lebucquière (French pronunciation: [ləbykjɛʁ]; Picard: L’Bucquère) is a commune in the Pas-de-Calais department in the Hauts-de-France region of France. 18 miles (29 km) southeast of Arras.

== Population ==
Historical population
| Year | Pop. | ±% p.a. |
|---|---|---|
| 1968 | 303 | — |
| 1975 | 282 | −1.02% |
| 1982 | 253 | −1.54% |
| 1990 | 251 | −0.10% |
| 1999 | 231 | −0.92% |
| 2007 | 231 | +0.00% |
| 2012 | 254 | +1.92% |
| 2017 | 234 | −1.63% |
| 2023 | 232 | −0.14% |
Source: INSEE

== Notable resident ==
- Christian Carion, French director.

== See also ==
- Communes of the Pas-de-Calais department
