= Bus, Pas-de-Calais =

Bus
- Commune
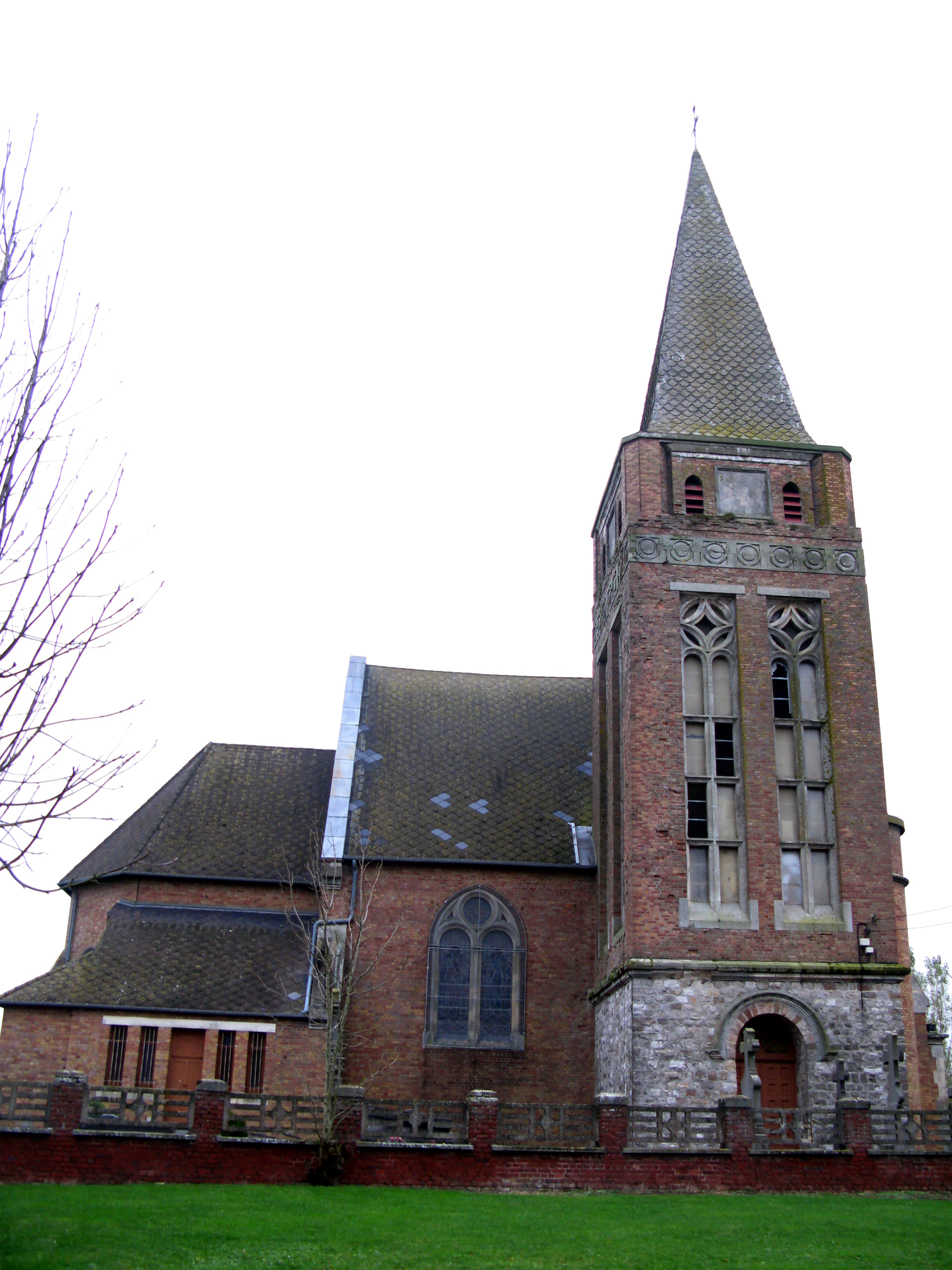
- The church of Bus

- Coat of arms
- Location of Bus
- Location within France Location within Hauts-de-France
- Coordinates: 50°03′58″N 2°57′56″E
- Country: France
- Region: Hauts-de-France
- Department: Pas-de-Calais
- Arrondissement: Arras
- Canton: Bapaume
- Intercommunality: CC Sud-Artois

Government
  - Mayor (2020–2026): Guy Alexandre
- Area^{1}: 3.24 km^{2} (1.25 sq mi)
- Elevation: 134 m (440 ft)
- Highest elevation: 132 m (433 ft)
- Lowest elevation: 113 m (371 ft)
- Population (2023): 132
  - Density: 40.7/km^{2} (106/sq mi)
- Time zone: UTC+01:00 (CET)
  - Summer (DST): UTC+02:00 (CEST)
- INSEE/Postal code: 62189 /62124
- ^{1} French Land Register data, which excludes lakes, ponds, glaciers > 1 km^{2} (0.386 sq mi or 247 acres) and river estuaries.

Bus (/by/) is a commune in the Pas-de-Calais department in the Hauts-de-France region in northern France.

== Geography ==
A small farming village located 22 miles (35 km) southeast of Arras on the D19 road, at the junction with the D7E. The A2 autoroute passes by just yards from the commune.

== Demographics ==
Historical population
Year	Pop.	±% p.a.
1968	118	—
1975	103	−1.92%
1982	96	−1.00%
1990	90	−0.80%
1999	105	+1.73%
2007	111	+0.70%
2012	132	+3.53%
2017	126	−0.93%
2023	132	+0.78%
Source: INSEE

== Sights ==
- The church of Notre-Dame, dating from the twentieth century.

== See also ==
- Communes of the Pas-de-Calais department
