= Hermies =

- Commune
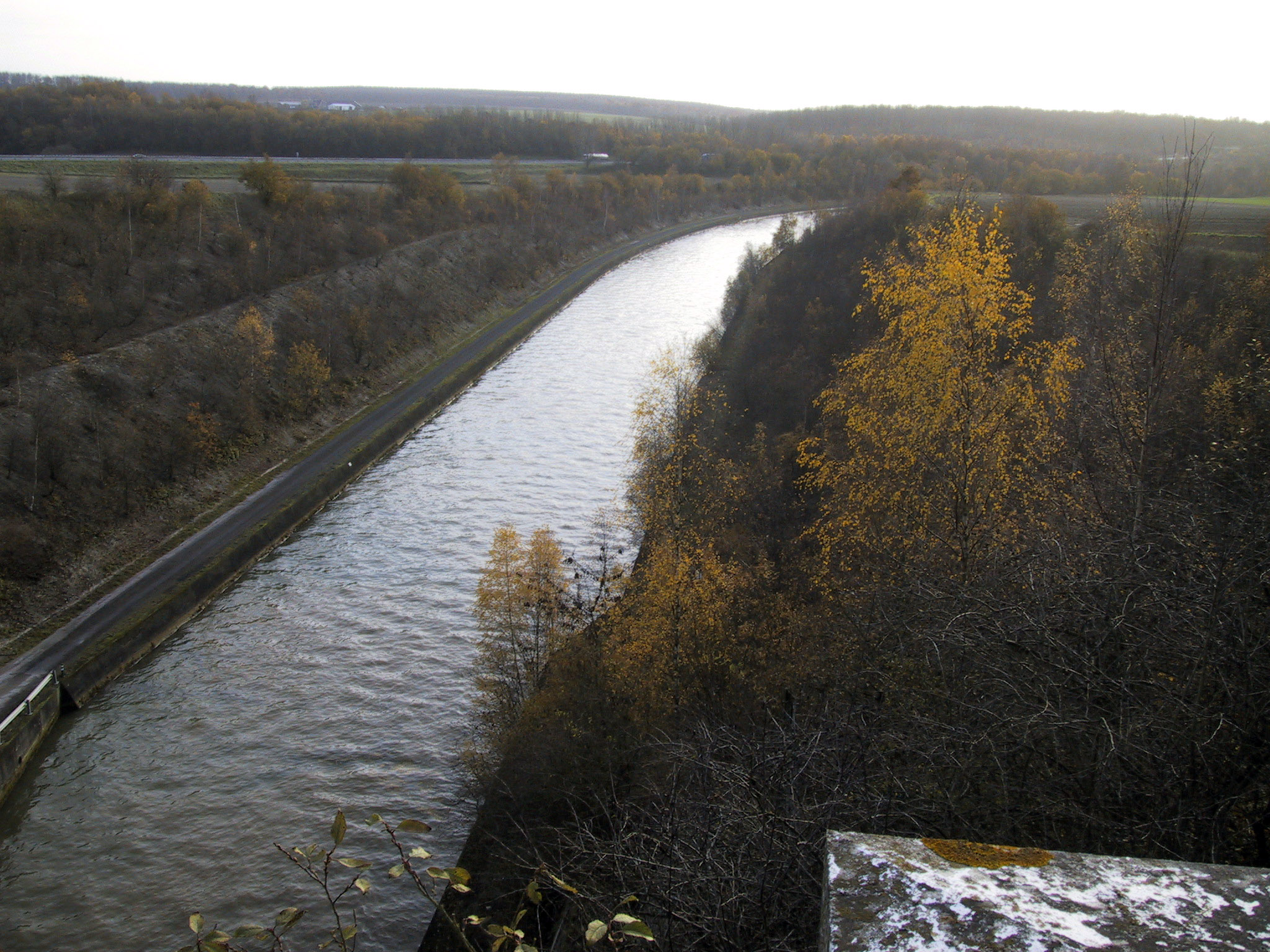
- The Canal du Nord
- Location of Hermies
- Location within France Location within Hauts-de-France
- Coordinates: 50°06′45″N 3°02′19″E
- Country: France
- Region: Hauts-de-France
- Department: Pas-de-Calais
- Arrondissement: Arras
- Canton: Bapaume
- Intercommunality: CC Sud-Artois

Government
  - Mayor (2020–2026): Françoise Leturcq
- Area^{1}: 13.05 km^{2} (5.04 sq mi)
- Elevation: 121 m (397 ft)
- Highest elevation: 127 m (417 ft)
- Lowest elevation: 77 m (253 ft)
- Population (2023): 1,062
  - Density: 81.38/km^{2} (210.8/sq mi)
- Time zone: UTC+01:00 (CET)
  - Summer (DST): UTC+02:00 (CEST)
- INSEE/Postal code: 62440 /62147
- ^{1} French Land Register data, which excludes lakes, ponds, glaciers > 1 km^{2} (0.386 sq mi or 247 acres) and river estuaries.

Hermies (French pronunciation: [ɛʁmi]) is a commune in the Pas-de-Calais department in the Hauts-de-France region of France 10 miles (16 km) southeast of Arras.

== Population ==
Historical population
Year	Pop.	±% p.a.
1968	1,287	—
1975	1,263	−0.27%
1982	1,189	−0.86%
1990	1,138	−0.55%
1999	1,130	−0.08%
2007	1,156	+0.28%
2012	1,179	+0.39%
2017	1,180	+0.02%
2023	1,062	−1.74%
Source: INSEE

== See also ==
- Communes of the Pas-de-Calais department
