= Neuville-Bourjonval =

- Commune
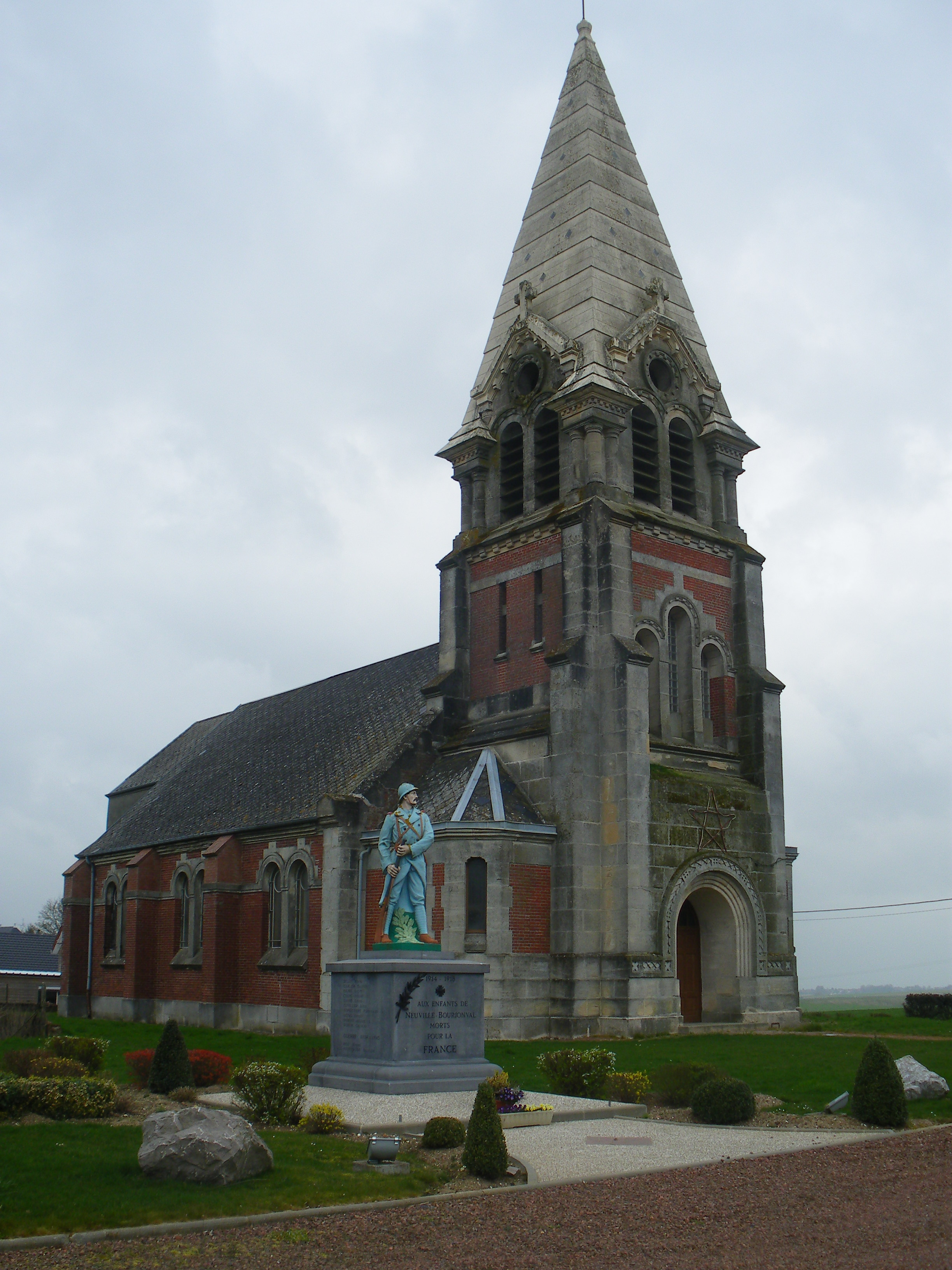
- The church of Neuville-Bourjonval

- Coat of arms
- Location of Neuville-Bourjonval
- Location within France Location within Hauts-de-France
- Coordinates: 50°04′09″N 3°01′20″E
- Country: France
- Region: Hauts-de-France
- Department: Pas-de-Calais
- Arrondissement: Arras
- Canton: Bapaume
- Intercommunality: CC Sud-Artois

Government
  - Mayor (2020–2026): Michel Pouillaude
- Area^{1}: 3.15 km^{2} (1.22 sq mi)
- Elevation: 129 m (423 ft)
- Highest elevation: 131 m (430 ft)
- Lowest elevation: 114 m (374 ft)
- Population (2023): 171
  - Density: 54.3/km^{2} (141/sq mi)
- Time zone: UTC+01:00 (CET)
  - Summer (DST): UTC+02:00 (CEST)
- INSEE/Postal code: 62608 /62124
- ^{1} French Land Register data, which excludes lakes, ponds, glaciers > 1 km^{2} (0.386 sq mi or 247 acres) and river estuaries.

Neuville-Bourjonval (French pronunciation: [nøvil buʁʒɔ̃val]) is a commune in the Pas-de-Calais department in the Hauts-de-France region of France.

== Geography ==
Neuville-Bourjonval is situated 23 miles (37 km) southeast of Arras, on the D7E road. The A2 autoroute passes through the commune.

== Population ==
Historical population
Year	Pop.	±% p.a.
1968	262	—
1975	223	−2.28%
1982	215	−0.52%
1990	191	−1.47%
1999	194	+0.17%
2007	170	−1.64%
2012	175	+0.58%
2017	168	−0.81%
2023	171	+0.30%
Source: INSEE

== Places of interest ==
- The church of St.Pierre, rebuilt, as was all of the village, after World War I.
- The Commonwealth War Graves Commission cemetery.

== See also ==
- Communes of the Pas-de-Calais department
