= Bertincourt =

- Commune
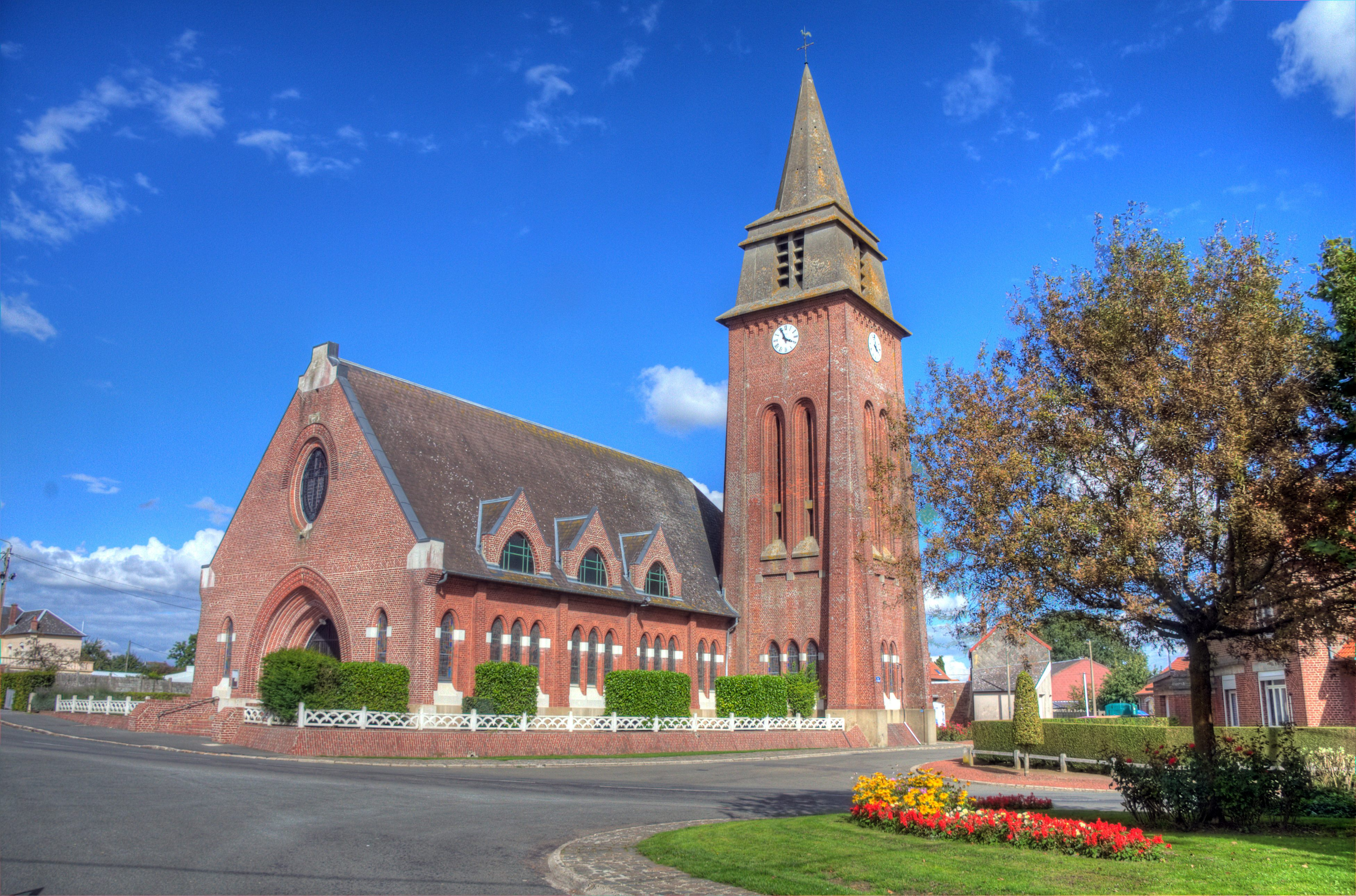
- The church of Bertincourt

- Coat of arms
- Location of Bertincourt
- Location within France Location within Hauts-de-France
- Coordinates: 50°05′11″N 2°58′52″E
- Country: France
- Region: Hauts-de-France
- Department: Pas-de-Calais
- Arrondissement: Arras
- Canton: Bapaume
- Intercommunality: CC du Sud-Artois

Government
  - Mayor (2020–2026): Bernard Bronniart
- Area^{1}: 7.58 km^{2} (2.93 sq mi)
- Elevation: 126 m (413 ft)
- Highest elevation: 133 m (436 ft)
- Lowest elevation: 92 m (302 ft)
- Population (2023): 920
  - Density: 120/km^{2} (310/sq mi)
- Time zone: UTC+01:00 (CET)
  - Summer (DST): UTC+02:00 (CEST)
- INSEE/Postal code: 62117 /62124
- ^{1} French Land Register data, which excludes lakes, ponds, glaciers > 1 km^{2} (0.386 sq mi or 247 acres) and river estuaries.

Bertincourt (French pronunciation: [bɛʁtɛ̃kuʁ]) is a commune in the Pas-de-Calais department in the Hauts-de-France region in northern France.

== Geography ==
Bertincourt is a farming village located 36 km (22 miles) southeast of Arras at the junction of the D7, D18 and D19 roads.

== Population ==
Historical population
Year	Pop.	±% p.a.
1968	836	—
1975	841	+0.09%
1982	856	+0.25%
1990	821	−0.52%
1999	886	+0.85%
2007	932	+0.63%
2012	914	−0.39%
2017	918	+0.09%
2023	920	+0.04%
Source: INSEE

== Sights ==
- The church of Notre-Dame, rebuilt, like most of the village, after the ravages of World War I.
- The World War I cemetery.

== See also ==
- Communes of the Pas-de-Calais department
