= Vaulx-Vraucourt =

- Commune
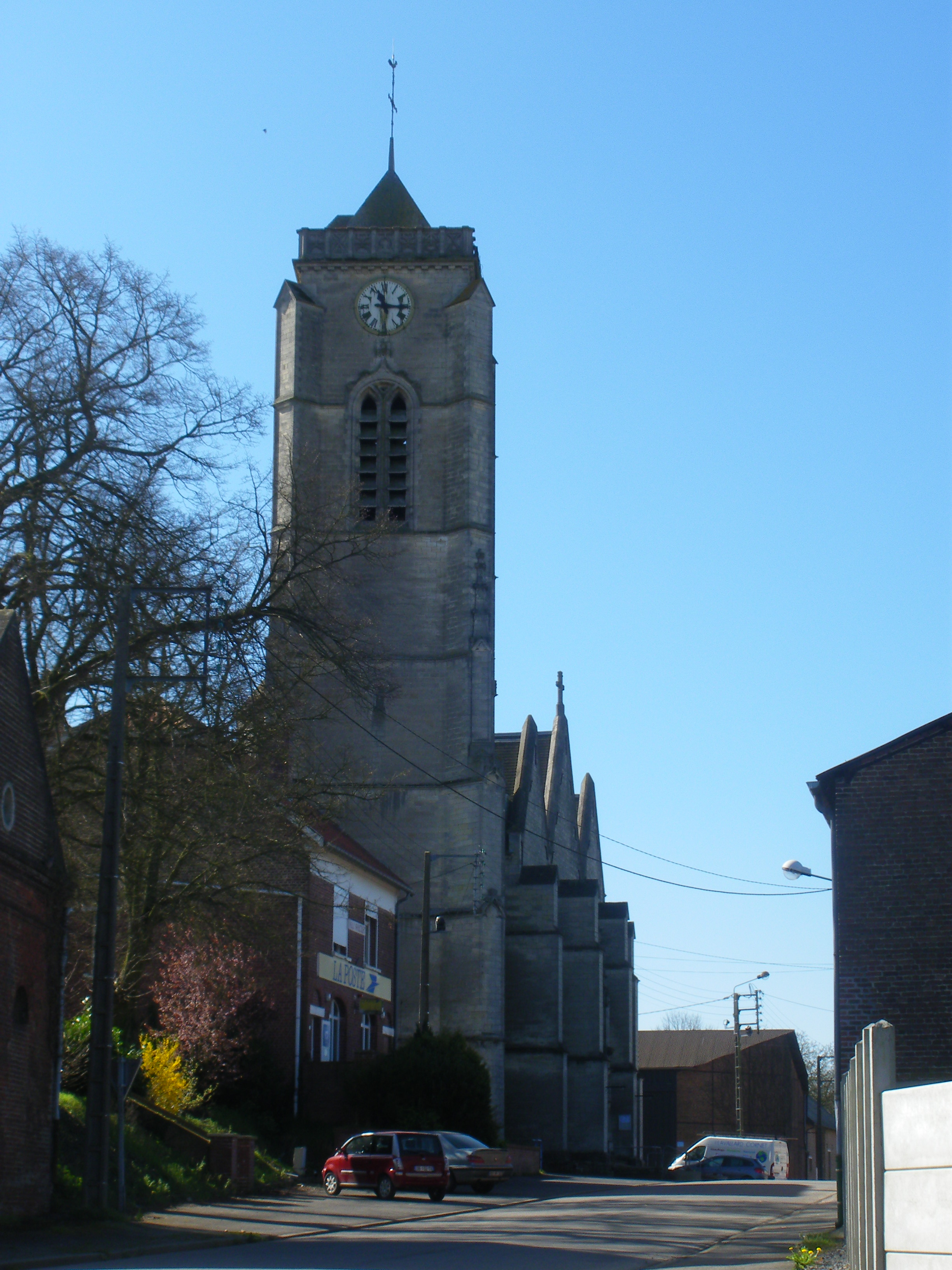
- The church of Vaulx-Vraucourt

- Coat of arms
- Location of Vaulx-Vraucourt
- Location within France Location within Hauts-de-France
- Coordinates: 50°08′50″N 2°54′34″E
- Country: France
- Region: Hauts-de-France
- Department: Pas-de-Calais
- Arrondissement: Arras
- Canton: Bapaume
- Intercommunality: CC Sud-Artois

Government
  - Mayor (2020–2026): Freddy Fournier
- Area^{1}: 14.11 km^{2} (5.45 sq mi)
- Elevation: 112 m (367 ft)
- Highest elevation: 122 m (400 ft)
- Lowest elevation: 83 m (272 ft)
- Population (2023): 1,099
  - Density: 77.89/km^{2} (201.7/sq mi)
- Time zone: UTC+01:00 (CET)
  - Summer (DST): UTC+02:00 (CEST)
- INSEE/Postal code: 62839 /62159
- ^{1} French Land Register data, which excludes lakes, ponds, glaciers > 1 km^{2} (0.386 sq mi or 247 acres) and river estuaries.

Vaulx-Vraucourt (French pronunciation: [voː vʁokˈuʁ]) is a commune in the Pas-de-Calais department in the Hauts-de-France region of France 15 miles (24 km) southeast of Arras and about 4 miles (6.4 km) northeast of Bapaume.

== History ==
The commune name comes from the two hamlets that were combined into one commune in 1821.

== Population ==
Historical population
Year	Pop.	±% p.a.
1968	1,047	—
1975	1,021	−0.36%
1982	1,075	+0.74%
1990	1,133	+0.66%
1999	1,110	−0.23%
2007	1,062	−0.55%
2012	1,061	−0.02%
2017	1,018	−0.82%
2023	1,099	+1.28%
Source: INSEE

== See also ==
- Communes of the Pas-de-Calais department
