= Ablainzevelle =

- Commune
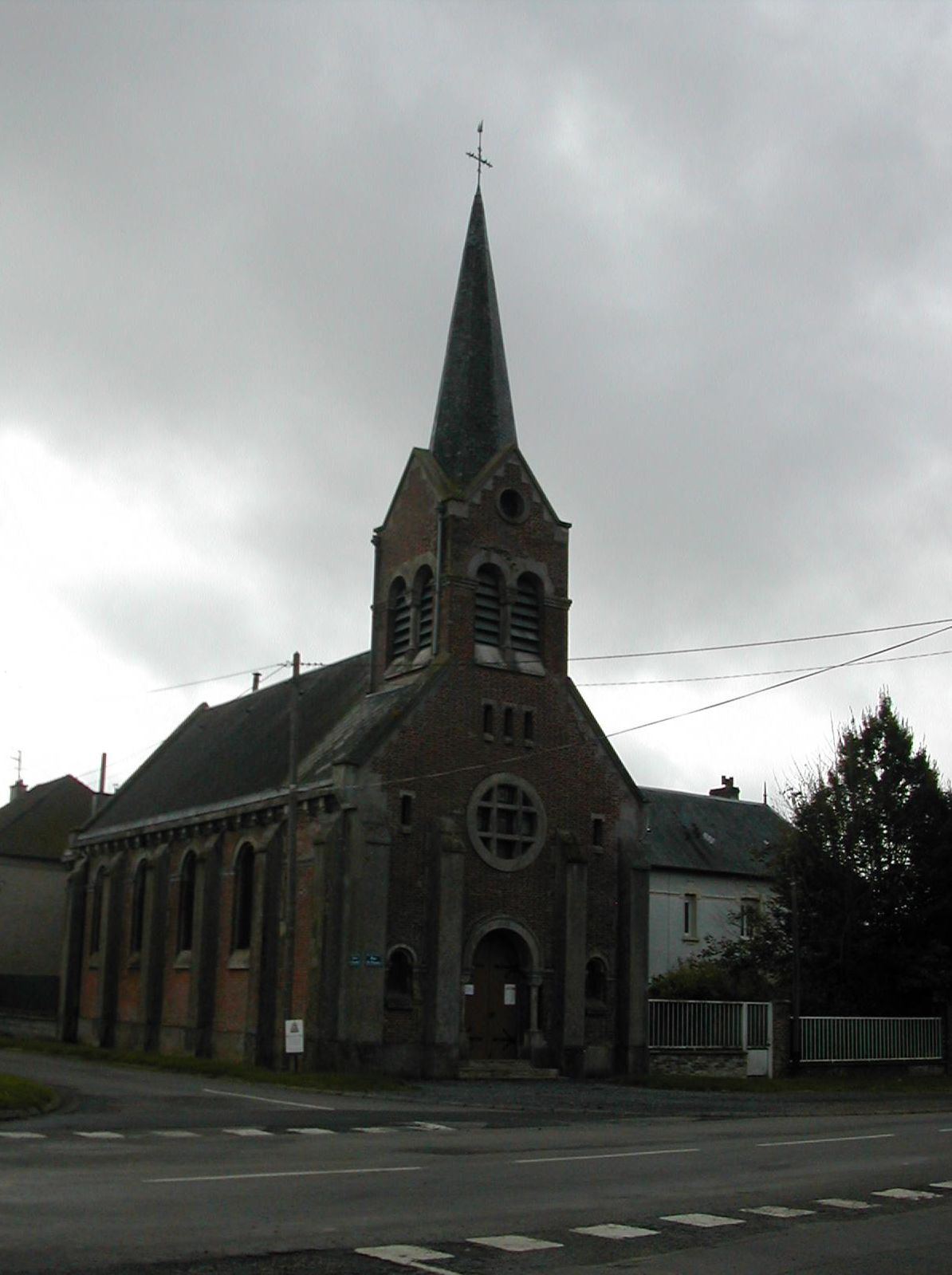
- The church of Ablainzevelle

- Coat of arms
- Location of Ablainzevelle
- Location within France Location within Hauts-de-France
- Coordinates: 50°09′10″N 2°43′56″E
- Country: France
- Region: Hauts-de-France
- Department: Pas-de-Calais
- Arrondissement: Arras
- Canton: Bapaume
- Intercommunality: Sud-Artois

Government
  - Mayor (2020–2026): Jean-François Laly
- Area^{1}: 4.32 km^{2} (1.67 sq mi)
- Elevation: 139 m (456 ft)
- Highest elevation: 144 m (472 ft)
- Lowest elevation: 116 m (381 ft)
- Population (2023): 208
  - Density: 48.1/km^{2} (125/sq mi)
- Demonym(s): Ablainzevellois, Ablainzevelloises
- Time zone: UTC+01:00 (CET)
  - Summer (DST): UTC+02:00 (CEST)
- INSEE/Postal code: 62002 /62116
- ^{1} French Land Register data, which excludes lakes, ponds, glaciers > 1 km^{2} (0.386 sq mi or 247 acres) and river estuaries.

Ablainzevelle (French pronunciation: [ablɛ̃zvɛl]) is a commune in the Pas-de-Calais department in northern France.

== Geography ==
A small farming village located 11 miles (18 km) south of Arras, at the D7 and D12 road junction. It was rebuilt after being destroyed during World War I.

== Population ==
Historical population

Year	Pop.	±% p.a.
1793	257	—
1821	276	+0.26%
1846	331	+0.73%
1872	306	−0.30%
1901	283	−0.27%
1926	198	−1.42%
1946	196	−0.05%
1962	168	−0.96%
1968	156	−1.23%

Year	Pop.	±% p.a.
1975	151	−0.46%
1982	141	−0.97%
1990	163	+1.83%
1999	172	+0.60%
2007	191	+1.32%
2012	206	+1.52%
2017	222	+1.51%
2023	208	−1.08%

Source: EHESS (1793-1999) and INSEE

== Sights ==
- The church of Notre-Dame, dating from the twentieth century.

== See also ==
- Communes of the Pas-de-Calais department
