= Grimston, Norfolk =

Village in Norfolk, England

Coordinates: 52.77195°N 0.54993°E

Grimston
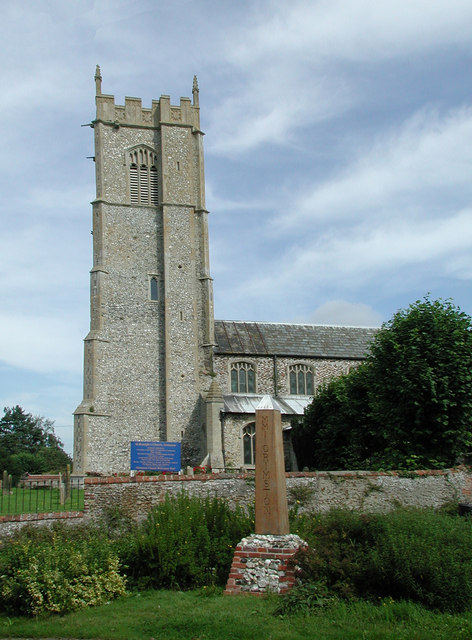
- St Botolph's Church

- Location within Norfolk
- Area: 6.98 sq mi (18.1 km^{2})
- Population: 2,020 (2021 census)
  - Density: 289/sq mi (112/km^{2})
- OS grid reference: TF721224
- Civil parish: Grimston
- District: King's Lynn and West Norfolk
- Shire county: Norfolk
- Region: East
- Country: England
- Sovereign state: United Kingdom
- Post town: KING'S LYNN
- Postcode district: PE32
- Dialling code: 01485
- Police: Norfolk
- Fire: Norfolk
- Ambulance: East of England
- UK Parliament: North West Norfolk

Grimston is a village and civil parish in the English county of Norfolk.

Grimston is located 5.7 miles (9.2 km) east of King's Lynn and 33 miles (53 km) north-west of Norwich.

== History ==
In 1860, a substantial Roman villa was discovered in Grimston, which was excavated in 1905.

Grimston's name is of mixed Anglo-Saxon and Viking origin and derives from an amalgamation of the Old English and Old Norse for Grimr's farm or settlement.

In the Domesday Book, Grimston is recorded as a settlement of 142 households in the hundred of Freebridge. In 1086, the village was divided between the estates of Bishop Odo of Bayeux, William de Warenne, Roger Bigod of Norfolk and Berner the Bowman.

Grimston, and the nearby hamlet of Pott Row, were significant centres of pottery production from the 11th to 16th centuries, and important suppliers of this to Scandinavia. Grimstonware has been found as far afield as Italy and Spain. Pots often had faces carved just under the rim. Some of these can be seen in local museums including the Castle Museum, Norwich.

The parish also includes the deserted medieval settlement of Wyveling, which was probably abandoned due to the ravages of the Black Death.

== Geography ==
According to the 2021 census, Grimston has a population of 2,020 people which shows an increase from the 1,980 people listed in the 2011 census.

The B1153, between Narborough and Brancaster, passes through the village.

Grimston Warren Pit is a Site of Special Scientific Interest due to the abundance of fossils from the Lower Cretaceous Period.

== St. Botolph's Church ==
Grimston's parish church is dedicated to Saint Botolph and dates from the Thirteenth Century. St. Botolph's is located within the village on Gayton Road and has been Grade I listed since 1960. The church no longer holds Sunday services but is part of the Gayton, Grimston & Great Massingham Benefice.

St. Botolph's has an impressive collection of medieval bench-ends and a stained-glass window installed in 1851 by the workshop of Michael O'Connor depicting Saint Paul before Herod Agrippa.

== Notable residents ==
- Adam Thoroughgood- (1604-1640) Virginia settler, born in Grimston.

== Governance ==
Grimston is part of the electoral ward of Gayton & Grimston for local elections and is part of the district of King's Lynn and West Norfolk.

The village's national constituency is North West Norfolk which has been represented by the Conservative's James Wild MP since 2010.

== War Memorial ==
Grimston War Memorial is a tall stone wheel cross in St. Botolph's Churchyard which was restored in 1990. The memorial lists the following names for the First World War:

Rank	Name	Unit	Date of death	Burial/Commemoration
St1C	Alfred Rumbles	HMS Pathfinder	5 Sep. 1914	Queensferry Cemetery
Cpl.	Fred H. Cobb	6th Bn., Durham Light Infantry	1 Nov. 1918	Niederzwehren Cemetery
Cpl.	Walter W. Hammond	8th Bn., Norfolk Regiment	22 Oct. 1917	Tyne Cot
Cpl.	Arthur W. Todd MM	9th Bn., Norfolk Regt.	15 Apr. 1918	Tyne Cot
ASn.	William H. Boldero	Hood Bn., Royal Naval Division	24 Mar. 1918	Arras Memorial
Dvr.	Reg V. Sheppard MM	Royal Army Service Corps	13 Feb. 1919	St Clement's Churchyard, Terrington St Clement
Gnr.	Arthur Padgett	191st Bty., Royal Garrison Artillery	30 Oct. 1917	Étaples Military Cemetery
Gnr.	Thomas E. Turvey	277th Bty., R.G.A.	3 May 1918	St. Botolph's Churchyard
Gnr.	Jonathan W. Twite	R.G.A.	12 Apr. 1917	Fosse No.10 Cemetery
Pte.	Albert Sayer	1st Bn., Border Regiment	27 Jan. 1917	Thiepval Memorial
Pte.	George H. Hardy	1st Bn., Cambridgeshire Regt.	26 Sep. 1917	Tyne Cot
Pte.	Ernest E. Mayes	1st Bn., Cambridgeshire Regt.	16 Jan. 1917	Lijssenthoek Cemetery
Pte.	Stanley C. Blake	53rd Bn., Devonshire Regiment	6 Nov. 1918	St. Botolph's Churchyard
Pte.	William H. Bird	13th Bn., East Surrey Regiment	14 Jul. 1917	Fins British Cemetery
Pte.	James T. Smith	1st Bn., Essex Regiment	28 Nov. 1915	Helles Memorial
Pte.	Robert S. Smith	10th Bn., Essex Regt.	21 Sep. 1918	Unicorn Cemetery
Pte.	Frederick Brinkley MM	7th Bn., Royal Fusiliers	30 Oct. 1917	Tyne Cot
Pte.	William H. Hooks	2/5th Bn., Lancashire Fusiliers	4 Nov. 1918	St. Botolph's Churchyard
Pte.	Frederick Spooner	8th Bn., Middlesex Regiment	17 Aug. 1917	Tyne Cot
Pte.	Cecil A. Ellaby	Wellington Regt., NZEF	8 Aug. 1915	Chunuk Bair Cemetery
Pte.	Lloyd F. Francklin	1st Bn., Norfolk Regiment	21 Apr. 1915	Menin Gate
Pte.	George W. Mayes	1st Bn., Norfolk Regt.	12 Jul. 1915	Perth Cemetery
Pte.	Stephen Rudd	2nd Bn., Norfolk Regt.	27 Apr. 1916	Amara War Cemetery
Pte.	John Blake	5th Bn., Norfolk Regt.	19 Apr. 1917	Gaza War Cemetery
Pte.	Charlie Bunting	5th Bn., Norfolk Regt.	3 Aug. 1917	Hadra War Cemetery
Pte.	William Padgett	7th Bn., Norfolk Regt.	13 Oct. 1915	Loos Memorial
Pte.	Alfred E. Barnes	8th Bn., Norfolk Regt.	16 Aug. 1917	Brandhoek Cemetery
Pte.	Edward Bunting	9th Bn., Norfolk Regt.	7 Feb. 1919	St. Botolph's Churchyard
Pte.	Samuel Smith	9th Bn., Norfolk Regt.	15 Apr. 1918	Tyne Cot
Pte.	Arthur Matsell	9th Bn., Sherwood Foresters	3 Oct. 1918	Quéant Road Cemetery
Pte.	Reginald W. King	5th Bn., Shropshire Light Inf.	5 May 1917	St. Sever Cemetery
Pte.	William Rudd	2nd Bn., South Wales Borderers	4 Dec. 1915	Helles Memorial
Pte.	Fred C. Cooper	7th Bn., Suffolk Regiment	13 Oct. 1915	Loos Memorial
Pte.	William Stebbings	11th Bn., Royal Sussex Regiment	15 Mar. 1917	Railway Dugouts Cem.
Rfn.	Walter M. G. Humphrey	13th Bn., K.R.R.C.	23 Oct. 1918	Beaurain Cemetery
Rfn.	Albert Seaman	11th Bn., Rifle Brigade	20 Mar. 1918	Thiepval Memorial

The following names were added after the Second World War:

Rank	Name	Unit	Date of death	Burial/Commemoration
Dvr.	Paul E. Hammond	284 Assault Sqdn., Royal Engineers	20 Oct. 1944	Adegem Cemetery
Pte.	Robert H. Rumbles	1st Bn., Royal Norfolk Regiment	23 Nov. 1944	Venray War Cemetery
