= Pott Row =

Village in Norfolk, England

Coordinates: 52.767391°N 0.526325°E

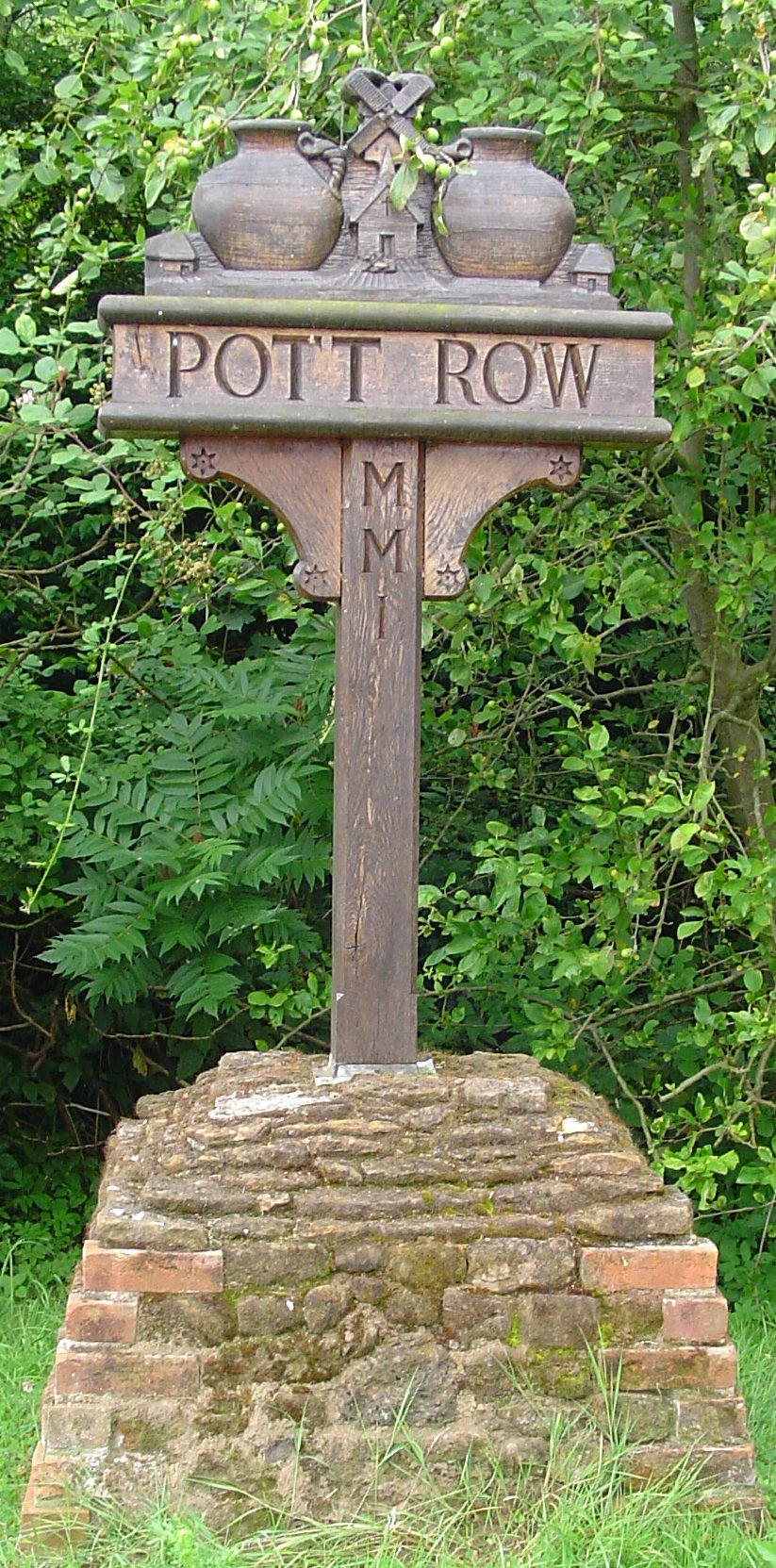
- Signpost in Pott Row

- Location within Norfolk
- Population: 1,000
- OS grid reference: TF705218
  - London: 108
- Civil parish: Grimston
- District: King's Lynn and West Norfolk
- Shire county: Norfolk
- Region: East
- Country: England
- Sovereign state: United Kingdom
- Post town: King's Lynn
- Postcode district: PE32
- Dialling code: 01485
- UK Parliament: North West Norfolk

Pott Row is an expanding village near King's Lynn, Norfolk. It is the western part of the civil and ecclesiastical Parish of Grimston.

Pott Row and neighbouring Grimston were quite significant centres of pottery production from the 11th to 16th centuries and important suppliers of this to Scandinavia. Pots often had faces carved just under the rim. Some of these can be seen in local Museums including the Castle Museum, Norwich.
