= Grimston Warren Pit =

Protected area in Norfolk, England

Coordinates: 52.771°N 0.479°E

- Site of Special Scientific Interest
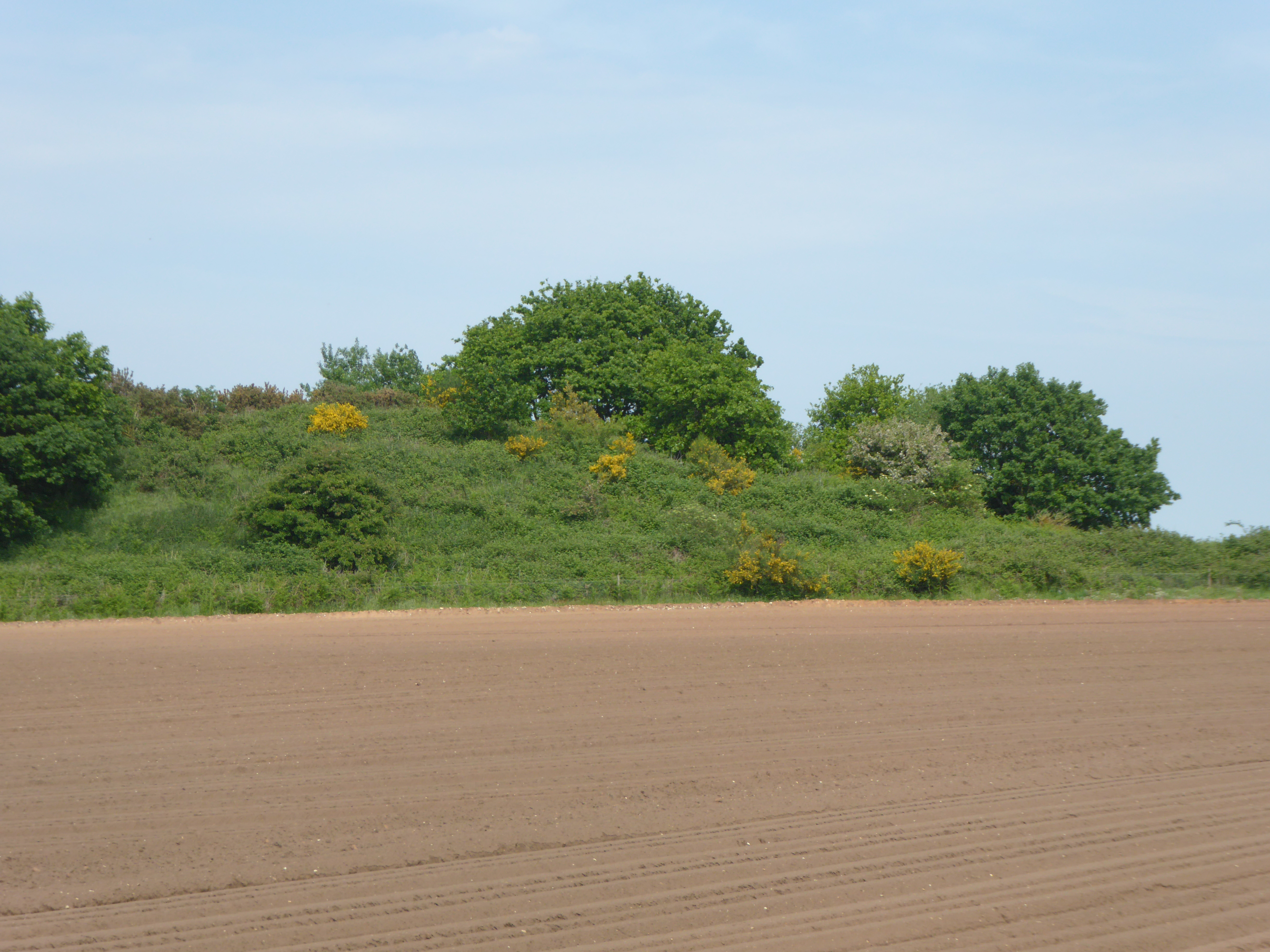
- Location of Grimston Warren Pit.
- Area of search: Norfolk, England
- Grid reference: TF 673 222
- Interest: Geological
- Area: 6.6 hectares (16 acres)
- Notification date: 1996
- Location map: Magic Map

Grimston Warren Pit is a 6.6-hectare (16-acre) geological Site of Special Scientific Interest east of King's Lynn in Norfolk, England. It is a Geological Conservation Review site.

This former quarry is described by Natural England as "a nationally important site for dating the constituent facies of the Lower Cretaceous in north Norfolk". It has yielded ammonites which date to the Hauterivian age around 130 million years ago.

The site is private land with no public access.
