= Quéant Road Cemetery =

WWI CWGC cemetery in Pas-de-Calais, France

Quéant Road Cemetery, Buissy
- Commonwealth War Graves Commission
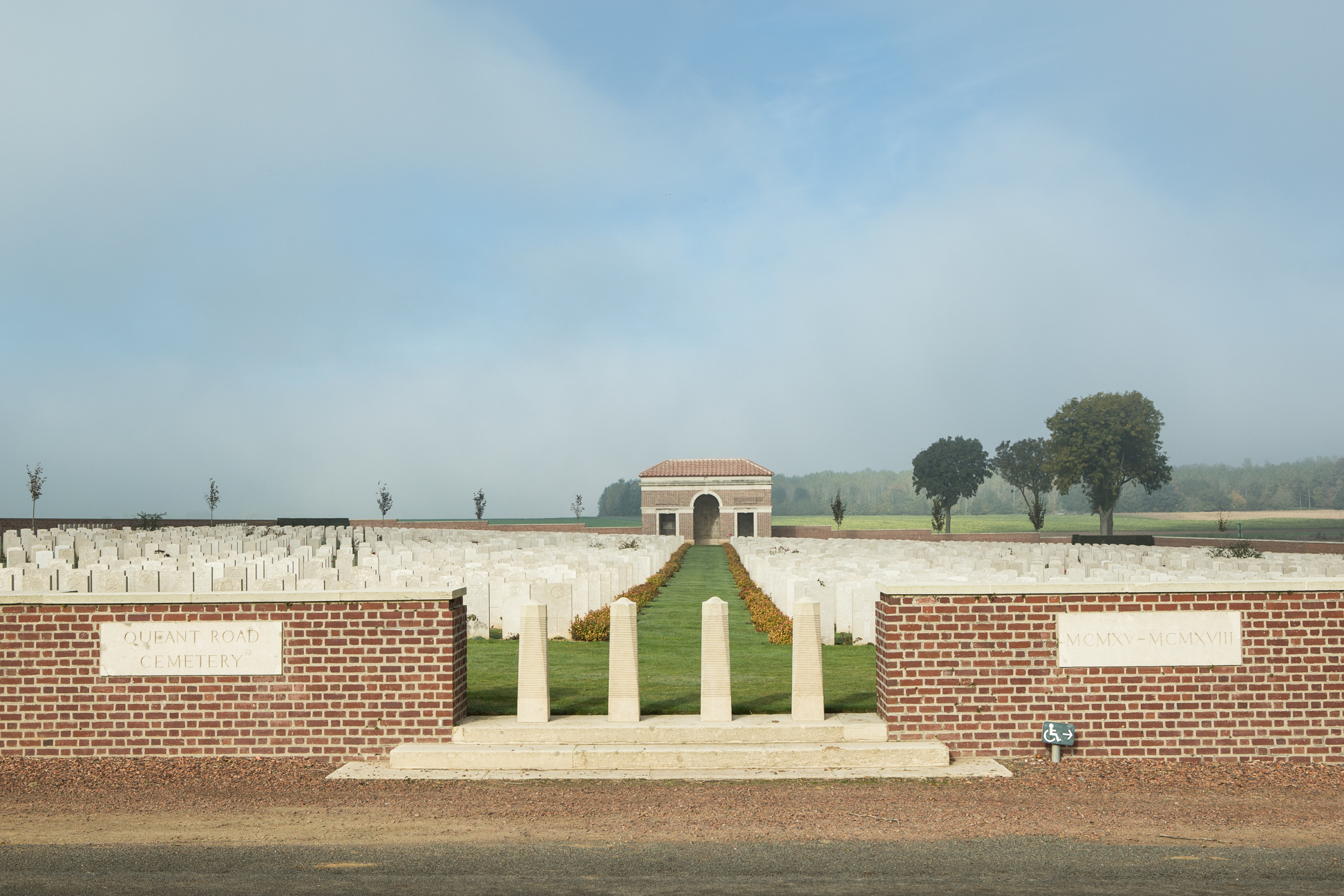
- For the dead of various battles of World War I
- Established: October 1918
- Location: 50°11′39″N 3°0′51″E near Buissy, Northern France
- Designed by: Sir Edwin Lutyens
- Total burials: 2,377
- Unknowns: 1,441

Quéant Road Cemetery is a World War I cemetery located between the villages of Buissy and Quéant in the Nord-Pas de Calais region of France. Situated on the north side of the D14 road, about three kilometres (two miles) from Buissy, it contains 2,377 burials and commemorations of Commonwealth soldiers who died in the era of 1917 and 1918. The first burials were of soldiers who died in the period from September to November 1918. Following the Armistice the cemetery was enlarged to accommodate over 2,200 burials moved from surrounding battlefields and cemeteries.

== Historical Information ==
Buissy was reached by the Third Army on 2 September 1918, after the storming of the Drocourt-Quéant line, and was evacuated by the Germans on the following day.

Quéant Road Cemetery was created by the 2nd and 57th Casualty Clearing Stations in October and November 1918. It then consisted of 71 graves (now Plot I, Rows A and B), but was greatly enlarged after the Armistice when 2,200 graves were brought in from the battlefields of 1917–1918 between Arras and Bapaume, and from the following smaller burial grounds in the area:

- Baralle Communal Cemetery British Extension, which was made in September 1918, contained the graves of 25 soldiers from the United Kingdom.
- Baralle Communal Cemetery German Extension, from which two graves were brought.
- Cagnicourt Communal Cemetery, contained the grave of one soldier from the United Kingdom who fell in September 1918.
- Cagnicourt (6th Jaeger Regiment) German Cemetery, East of the village, contained 137 German graves and one British.
- Noreuil British Cemeteries No. 1 and No. 2. These were close together, about 400 metres North of Noreuil village. They were made in April–August 1917, and they contained the graves of 50 soldiers from Australia and 16 from the United Kingdom. Some of these were re-buried in H.A.C. Cemetery, Ecoust-St. Mein.
- Noreuil German Cemetery No. 1, next to Noreuil Australian Cemetery, contained 78 German graves and ten British.
- Pronville German Cemetery "near the Cave", on the Western outskirts of Pronville, contained 17 British graves.
- Pronville German Cemetery No. 4, South of Pronville on the road to Beaumetz, contained 83 German and 83 British graves. 52 of the British graves were those of soldiers of the Black Watch.
- Pronville Churchyard, contained two British graves.

There are 2,377 Commonwealth servicemen of the First World War buried or commemorated in Quéant Road Cemetery. 1,441 of the burials are unidentified, and there are special memorials to 56 casualties known or believed to be buried among them. Other special memorials commemorate 26 casualties buried in German cemeteries in the neighbourhood, whose graves could not be found on concentration.
