= Quéant =

- Commune
- Hirondelle Park

- Coat of arms
- Location of Quéant
- Location within France Location within Hauts-de-France
- Coordinates: 50°10′48″N 2°59′03″E
- Country: France
- Region: Hauts-de-France
- Department: Pas-de-Calais
- Arrondissement: Arras
- Canton: Bapaume
- Intercommunality: Osartis Marquion

Government
  - Mayor (2020–2026): Jérôme Dartus
- Area^{1}: 9.02 km^{2} (3.48 sq mi)
- Elevation: 75 m (246 ft)
- Highest elevation: 102 m (335 ft)
- Lowest elevation: 62 m (203 ft)
- Population (2023): 631
  - Density: 70.0/km^{2} (181/sq mi)
- Time zone: UTC+01:00 (CET)
  - Summer (DST): UTC+02:00 (CEST)
- INSEE/Postal code: 62673 /62860
- ^{1} French Land Register data, which excludes lakes, ponds, glaciers > 1 km^{2} (0.386 sq mi or 247 acres) and river estuaries.

Quéant (French pronunciation: [keɑ̃]) is a commune in the Pas-de-Calais department in the Hauts-de-France region of France 15 miles (24 km) southeast of Arras.

== Population ==
Historical population
Year	Pop.	±% p.a.
1968	632	—
1975	561	−1.69%
1982	548	−0.33%
1990	506	−0.99%
1999	549	+0.91%
2007	583	+0.75%
2012	653	+2.29%
2017	657	+0.12%
2023	631	−0.67%
Source: INSEE

== Places of interest ==
- The Quéant Road Cemetery, overseen by the Commonwealth War Graves Commission.

== See also ==
- Communes of the Pas-de-Calais department
- Battle of Drocourt-Quéant Line (1918)
