= Étreillers =

- Commune
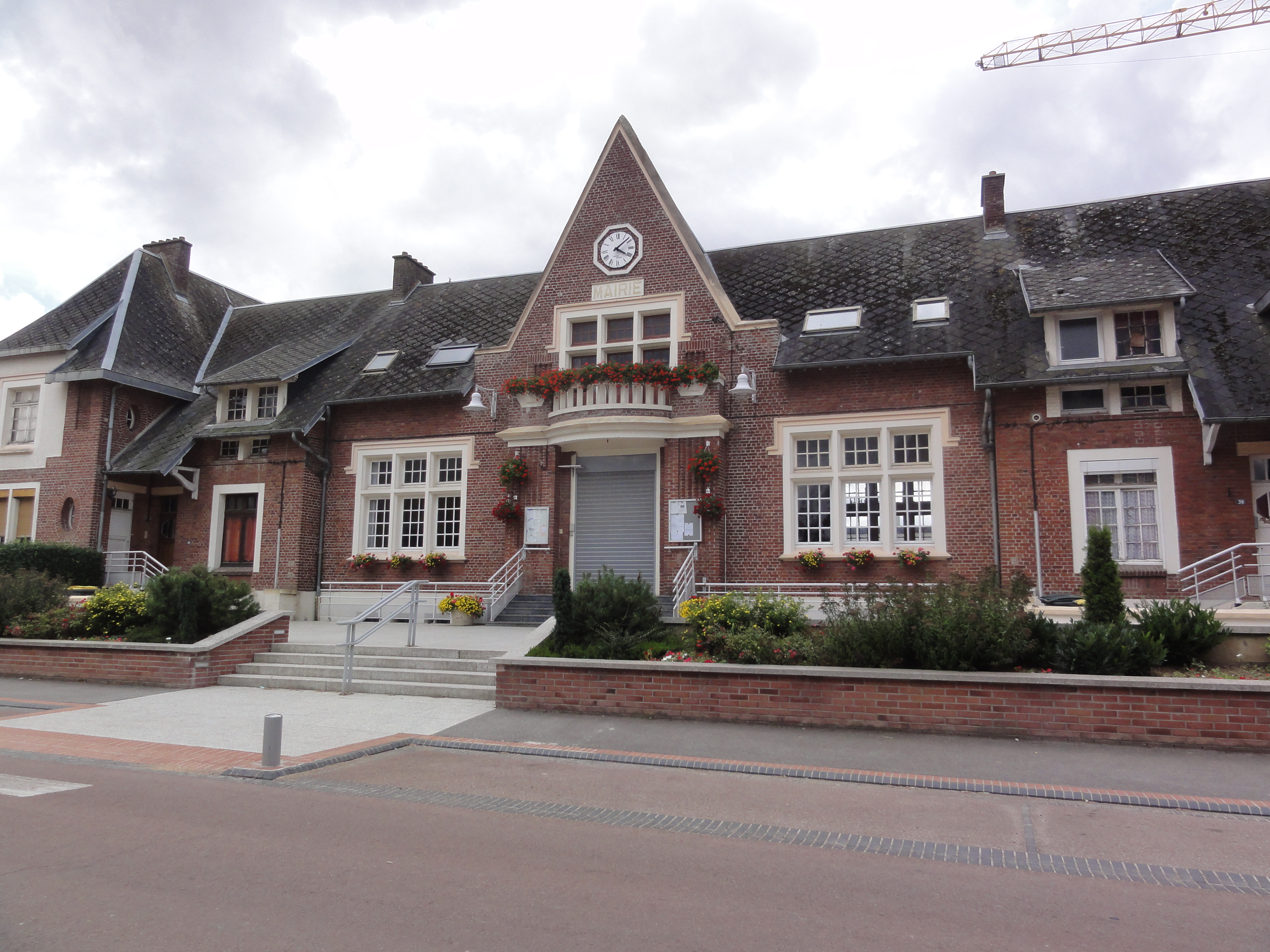
- The town hall of Étreillers

- Coat of arms
- Location of Étreillers
- Location within France Location within Hauts-de-France
- Coordinates: 49°49′47″N 3°09′40″E
- Country: France
- Region: Hauts-de-France
- Department: Aisne
- Arrondissement: Saint-Quentin
- Canton: Saint-Quentin-1
- Intercommunality: Pays du Vermandois

Government
  - Mayor (2026–32): Jean-Marie Remy
- Area^{1}: 8.69 km^{2} (3.36 sq mi)
- Elevation: 100 m (330 ft)
- Highest elevation: 125 m (410 ft)
- Lowest elevation: 81 m (266 ft)
- Population (2023): 1,157
  - Density: 133/km^{2} (345/sq mi)
- Time zone: UTC+01:00 (CET)
  - Summer (DST): UTC+02:00 (CEST)
- INSEE/Postal code: 02296 /02590
- ^{1} French Land Register data, which excludes lakes, ponds, glaciers > 1 km^{2} (0.386 sq mi or 247 acres) and river estuaries.

Étreillers (French pronunciation: [etʁɛje]) is a commune in the Aisne department in Hauts-de-France in northern France.

== Population ==
Historical population
Year	Pop.	±% p.a.
1968	974	—
1975	1,025	+0.73%
1982	1,053	+0.39%
1990	1,115	+0.72%
1999	1,105	−0.10%
2007	1,120	+0.17%
2012	1,202	+1.42%
2017	1,208	+0.10%
2023	1,157	−0.72%
Source: INSEE

== See also ==
- Communes of the Aisne department
