= Bapaume Communal Cemetery =

CWGC cemetery in Pas-de-Calais, France

- Interactive map of Bapaume Communal Cemetery

Details
- Established: 1914
- Location: Bapaume, Pas-de-Calais
- Country: France
- Coordinates: 50°6′40″N 2°50′50″E
- Type: Municipal cemetery/Military cemetery
- No. of graves: 27 (military)
- Website: cwgc.org
- Find a Grave: Bapaume Communal Cemetery

The Bapaume Communal Cemetery (French: Cimetière communal de Bapaume) is a cemetery located in the French commune of Bapaume (Pas-de-Calais). It is in part a military cemetery, one of several in the area maintained by the Commonwealth War Graves Commission. The CWGC graves are in small plots scattered in different parts of the cemetery and commemorate British and Commonwealth soldiers who fought in World War I and World War II.

== Location ==
The cemetery is located north of Bapaume, which is itself located on the D917 road between the cities of Arras and Paris.

== History ==
First World War

Bapaume was conquered by the Germans on 26 September 1914 and was retaken by the British on 17 March 1917. The Germans took the village again on 24 March 1918 during their spring offensive, but the Allied New Zealand Division was able to take it back on 29 August. Two battles, occurring on 24–25 March 1918 and 31 August – 3 September 1918, respectively, are named after the village.

Second World War

Bapaume was occupied by Nazi Germany in May 1940 as German forces pursued the British Expeditionary Force in the Battle of France.

== Burials ==
The soldiers honoured mostly died fighting near the village of Bapaume between September 1914 and September 1918.

The site includes 25 identified British and Commonwealth graves, of which 24 are from World War I and one is from World War II. The site also contains 2 unidentified Commonwealth graves.

== Related sites ==
Bapaume is also the site of Bapaume Australian Cemetery. Another similarly-named cemetery is Bapaume Post Military Cemetery, which is not in the village but on the Route nationale 29 near Albert.
