= Michèle Bellon =

French engineer and business leader

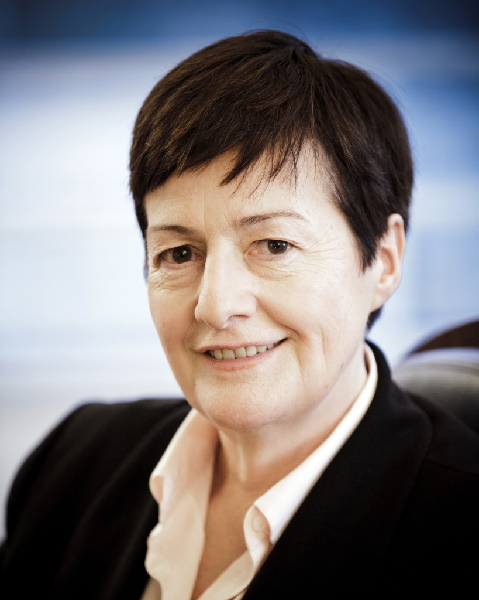
- Occupation: President of the ERDF Board of Directors until January 24, 2014 (Électricité Réseau Distribution France)

Michèle Bellon, born Carlier on January 22, 1949 in Bapaume, Pas-de-Calais, is a French business leader. Since March 2010, she served as President of the Directorate ERDF (Électricité Réseau Distribution France). She was the woman at the head of the largest French company in terms of number of employees (35,000), until 2014.

== Biography ==
=== Early life and family ===
She is the daughter of Jeanine Carlier, a nursery school principal, and André Carlier, agricultural equipment trader, Michèle Bellon grew up in the town of Bapaume. She studied at the Gambetta School in Arras in 1961, then completed her final year at the Fénelon School in Lille in 1965.

She has been married since July 29, 1972. She has two children and is a grandmother.

=== Education ===
Bellon trained at École Centrale Paris, now CentraleSupélec. She continued her studies in the United States where she obtained a Master of Science in Nuclear Engineering from Northwestern University.

=== Career at EDF ===
In 1974, Michèle Bellon joined EDF as Principal Engineer and then deputy to the Head of Service in the Equipment Department during the seventeen years she spent there.

In 1991, she became the first woman appointed deputy director, responsible for the Engineering Studies Department of the National Center for Thermal Equipment. She then developed several international power plant projects.

In 1995, Michèle Bellon joined the Personnel and Social Relations Department of EDF-GDF (180,000 employees) as Project Director and then Deputy Director. In these functions, she was responsible for social negotiations within EDF (employment, working time, training, salaries, integration of the handicap, etc.) in the context of the 1995 strikes.

From 1999 to 2000, she was Deputy Director, in the clientele division of the Presidency and General Management of EDF. She then participated in the international development of the company (EDF Energy, EnBW, and EDF Trading). In mid-2000, Michèle Bellon was appointed Director of the Fuel Division of EDF Pôle Industrie.

=== Managing Dalkia ===
As part of her functions within the clientele division, Michèle Bellon ensured EDF's acquisition of capital of the energy division of Veolia: Dalkia.

In 2001, she joined the Veolia Group, at the request of EDF, as Deputy Director-General of Veolia Energy (Dalkia) and Director General of Dalkia International. As the main contact for local authorities, she is also responsible for negotiating with industrial partners.

=== Director of ERDF ===
In March 2010, she was appointed Chairman of the Board of ERDF after the departure of Michel Francony. She sees ERDF as "a company that rests on two feet: Men and women, skills, with real expertise, real dedication, a real commitment to public service. And the technologies, the technologies of cables and transformers, but also the tomorrow of smart meters."

Another project she is working on is improving relations with the FNCCR, the national federation of authorities granting electricity distribution networks. For this, the regional organization of ERDF was reviewed under her supervision in order to facilitate contacts between ERDF managers and local elected officials. Michèle Bellon has also undertaken dialogue directly with the granting authorities, to sign several charters with representatives of local authorities (FNCCR, AMRF ...). Involved in the field of disability integration, the ERDF manager also signed with Éric Besson, Minister of Industry, a cooperation agreement in September 2011, to reduce the “digital divide” suffered by the most vulnerable people. On the place of women in the business world, Michèle Bellon admits that "we are not very numerous as business owners" and that within ERDF its objective is to reach 20% of women in the company by 2015 (18% mid-2012).

In order to modernize the electricity distribution network, Michèle Bellon is involved in the development of smart electricity networks, in particular through the smart meter "Linky," to ensure the integration into the network of renewable energy and the development of the electric car. At the onset of the Grid4EU project, the director of ERDF works to coordinate the different European initiatives in the field of smart grids. At the national level, this desire is reflected in the multiplication of experiments with these new types of networks (NiceGrid, GreenLys...). In November 2012, the chairman of the ERDF management board accompanied Delphine Batho, Minister of Ecology, on a visit to the Landis+Gyr plant in Montluçon where the Linky smart meters produced by this company are assembled.

Since the arrival of Michèle Bellon, the average power outage time has fallen by 39% between 2010 and 2011. This improvement is explained by much more favorable weather than the previous year. The increase in ERDF investments to nearly 3 billion euros per year could have a stabilizing effect in the long term, while improving the financial situation of the company. During Cyclone Joachim, Michèle Bellon intervened in the management of the crisis unit and the rapid intervention force for electricity mobilized by ERDF in the event of large-scale power cuts.

Her first term ended in December 2012, Michèle Bellon was re-elected on January 11, 2013 as the head of ERDF.

On January 24, 2014, she left the position of chairman of the ERDF management board to Philippe Monloubou, as she turned 65 and reached the age limit set in ERDF's statutes.

=== Other career ===
Since 2014, Michèle Bellon has been a member of the Board of Directors of the Danish company Athena Investments and RATP. She has also been a member of the Board of HF Company since 2016. She was a director of l’Institut Pasteur de Shanghai.

== Decorations ==
- Officer in the French Order of Merit (13 September 2000)
- Knight of the French Legion of Honour (14 July 20210)
- Officer of the National Order of Merit (15 May 2014)
