= Bapaume =

- Commune
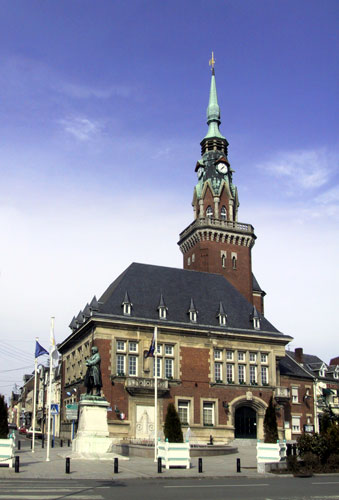
- The Town Hall

- Coat of arms
- Location of Bapaume
- Location within France Location within Hauts-de-France
- Coordinates: 50°06′16″N 2°51′07″E
- Country: France
- Region: Hauts-de-France
- Department: Pas-de-Calais
- Arrondissement: Arras
- Canton: Bapaume
- Intercommunality: CC du Sud-Artois

Government
  - Mayor (2020–2026): Jean-Jacques Cottel
- Area^{1}: 5.76 km^{2} (2.22 sq mi)
- Elevation: 122 m (400 ft)
- Highest elevation: 137 m (449 ft)
- Lowest elevation: 108 m (354 ft)
- Population (2023): 3,779
  - Density: 656/km^{2} (1,700/sq mi)
- Time zone: UTC+01:00 (CET)
  - Summer (DST): UTC+02:00 (CEST)
- INSEE/Postal code: 62080 /62450
- ^{1} French Land Register data, which excludes lakes, ponds, glaciers > 1 km^{2} (0.386 sq mi or 247 acres) and river estuaries.

Bapaume (French pronunciation: [bapom]; original Dutch name Batpalmen) is a commune in the Pas-de-Calais department in the Hauts-de-France region of northern France.

== Geography ==
Bapaume is a farming and light industrial town located some 23 km south by south-east of Arras and 50 km north-east of Amiens. Access to the commune is by the D 917 road from Ervillers in the north which passes through the commune in a zig-zag then continues south-east to Beaulencourt. The D 930 goes east by north-east to Frémicourt. The D 929 branches off the D 917 at the edge of the commune and goes south-west to Warlencourt-Eaucourt. The A1 autoroute passes south down the eastern edge of the commune and serves the city by the exit 14.

=== The Bapaume threshold ===
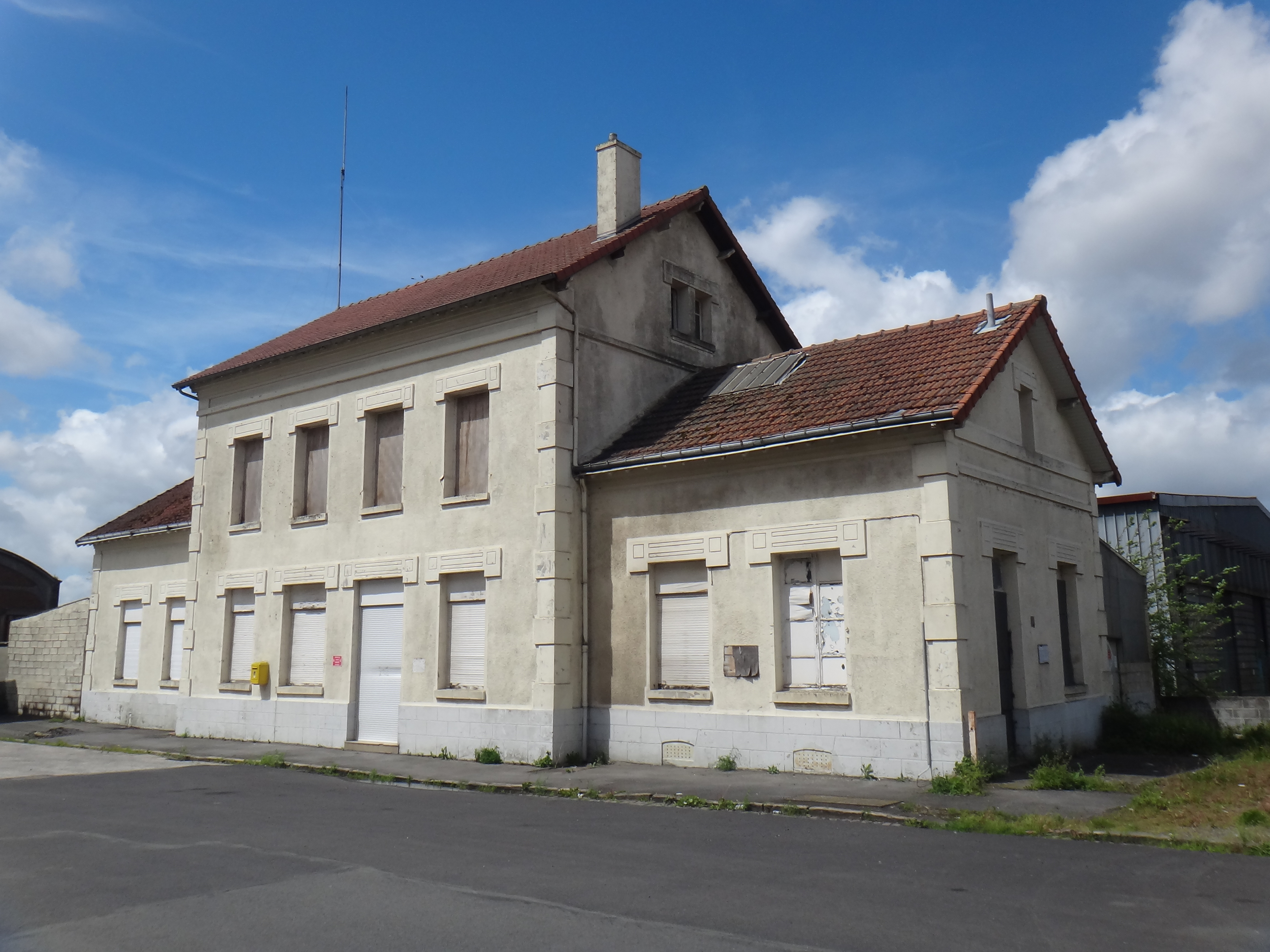
The old railway station

Bapaume has been called the Seuil de Bapaume (Bapaume threshold) due to its position as a crossing point between Artois and the Flanders plain on one side, and the Somme valley and the Paris Basin on the other. From the mid-11th century there was a Bapaume toll which was revised in 1202 and again in 1442.

Many roads pass through Bapaume, both old roads between the two regions, as well as the freeway since 1965 and the TGV since 1993. In the 19th century, however, the city council opposed the passage through its territory of the Paris–Lille railway.

This position was regretted by 1859 when the municipality called for the construction of a railway linking Achiet-le-Grand (on the Paris-Lille route) to Bapaume with animal traction. The first section of the Achiet–Marcoing railway linked the two communes and was commissioned in 1871, with steam traction. The line was later extended to Marcoing.

== Toponymy ==
Bapaume (Batpalmen or Bapalmen in Flemish) means "beat your palms" in the sense of "suffering" because of the poverty of the land or some past devastation.

== History ==
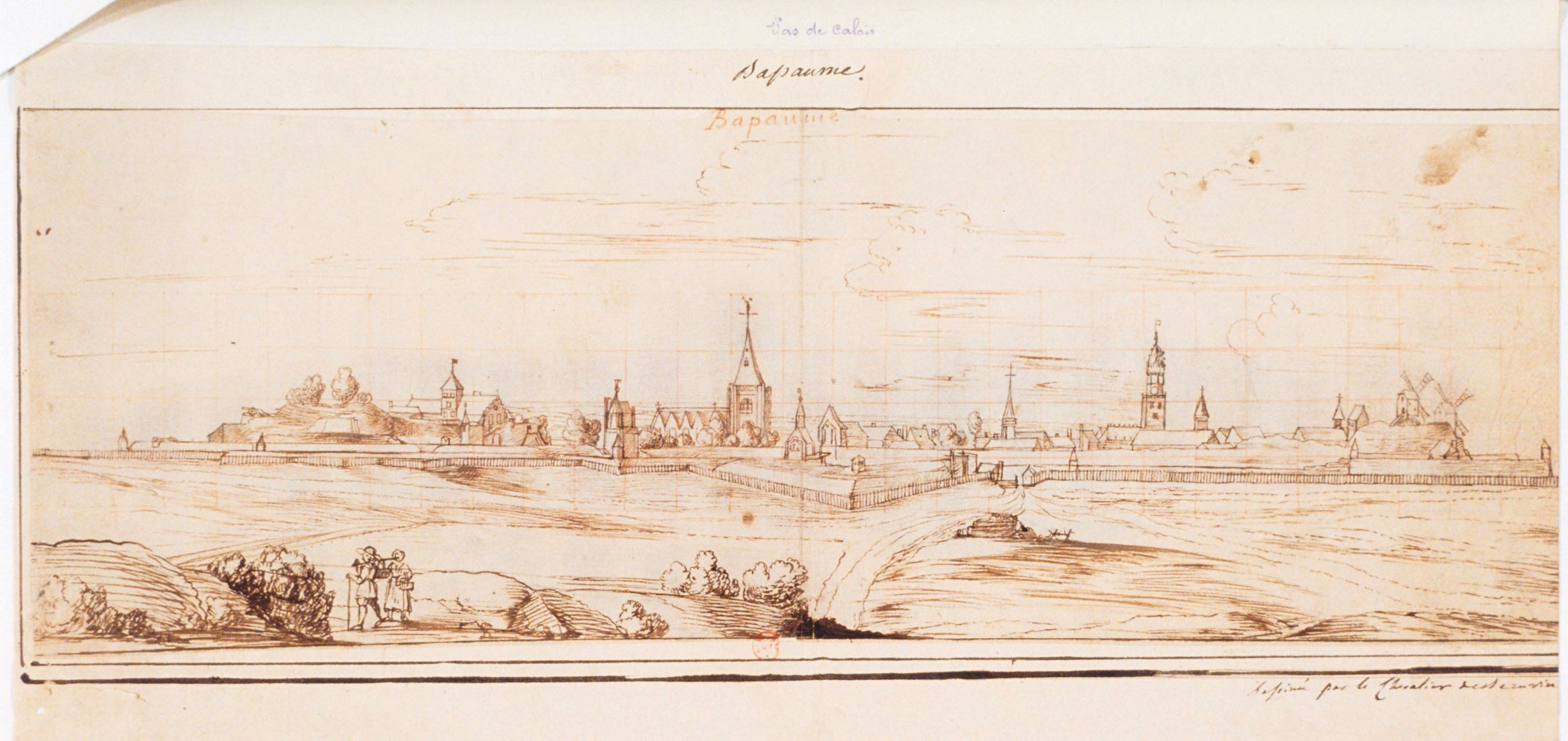
General View at the Péronne gate (17th century)

=== Early Bapaume ===
The current city is not in its original location. During the Gallic period the town was located some 1500 m to the west near an abundant source: the source of the Sensée river. During the Roman Empire the town prospered as it was next to the road linking Bavay to Amiens. This period lasted about three centuries.

The barbarian invasions of 255–280 totally destroyed this first Bapaume.

Under the Late Roman Empire the city was rebuilt in the same place by Batavi settlers who were enlisted as soldier-farmers. Defensive mounds were built around the site of the current Bapaume and the road from Arras to Saint-Quentin and Péronne was diverted to pass near the defences.

This town was called Helena and was the place where Aetius repulsed the Frankish invasion attempt in 448. This invasion was successful in 454 and ended the Roman presence. During the following centuries the city was devastated several times. The Franks built a castle on the Roman mound as the area was inhabited by bandits who hid in the Arrouaise forest. A bandit called Bérenger seized the castle by a ruse and made his mark on it. After his death the people of Helluin (Helena) came to shelter near the fort and thus Bapaume was born. Helluin disappeared gradually. It is through several excavations at this place that traces of this city were found and its history.

=== The Counts of Flanders ===
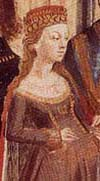
Isabelle de Hainaut

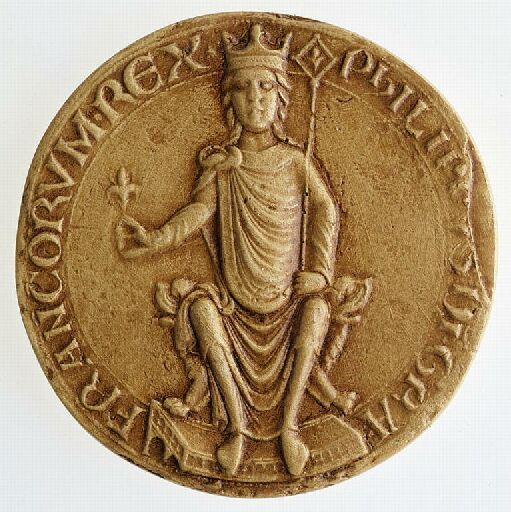
Seal of Philip Augustus

The city gradually grew in importance, the main traffic was not east–west but north–south. To ensure the passage against the bandits a toll was established by the counts of Flanders with soldiers escorting the merchants on the part crossing the Arrouaise Forest and north of the city. Churches were built with this toll. The Lords of Bapaume were subject to the Counts of Flanders.

On 28 April 1180 the marriage of Philip Augustus and Isabelle of Hainaut, daughter of Baldwin V was celebrated at Bapaume. Due to this union, in 1191 Bapaume was placed under the control of the King of France.

=== The Kingdom of France and the County of Artois ===
Philip Augustus returned several times to Bapaume to grant communal charters. The city became independent with the construction of a town hall with a belfry, the creation of a coat of arms and a seal, and a citizens' militia. In 1202 the toll was first revised then a second time in 1291. It was Louis IX of France, in 1237, who attached Bapaume to the County of Artois from under the thumb of Robert d'Artois, his brother, provided it paid homage to the kings of France. The city enjoyed a period of prosperity from the toll and its fine linen weaving (Batiste) by mulquiniers (Note: Weavers of fine Batiste linen) in the countryside. Robert I, Count of Artois was succeeded by Robert II, Count of Artois then Mahaut, Countess of Artois as head of the County of Artois. The nephew of Mahaut called himself Robert III of Artois and claimed the throne for a long time and, in revenge, helped the English. There followed a long period of war and disasters.

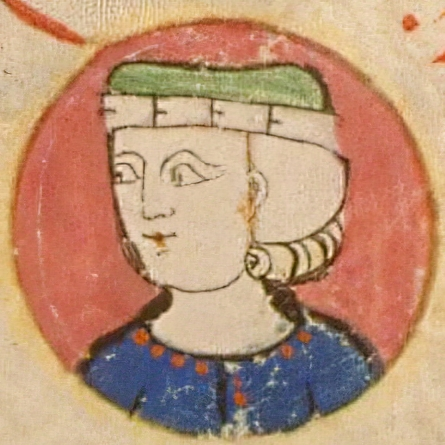
Robert I

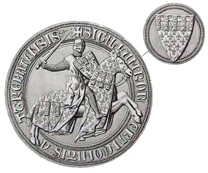
Robert II

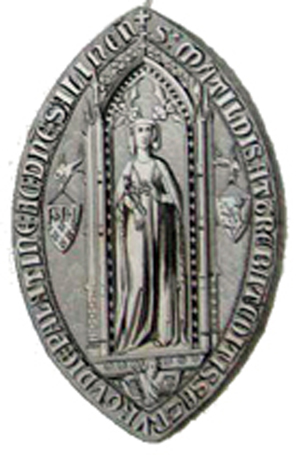
Mahaut of Artois

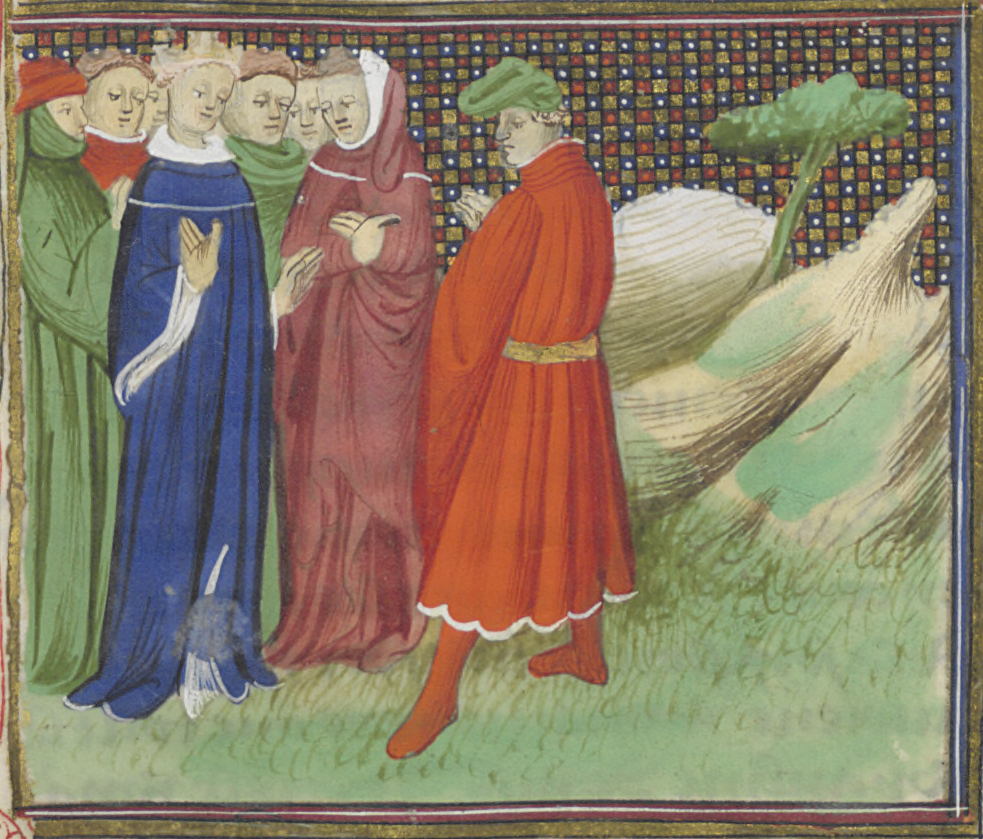
Robert III and King Edward III

Countess Mahaut often resided at the castle as she traveled frequently. She had her own room there and undertook numerous fortification works. On her death Bapaume passed to the Count of Flanders in 1330. He undertook major works including a surrounding wall and large ditches around the city in 1335. The entire castle and city was one of the most beautiful fortresses and was called the "Key of Artois".

=== The Hundred Years' War ===
The fortifications protected the inhabitants of Bapaume repeatedly from frightful depredations by the English in that war. The Bailiwick of Bapaume suffered terribly during this period: it is during this time that villagers hid in their muches (underground hiding places) dug in the chalky soil.

=== The Dukes of Burgundy ===
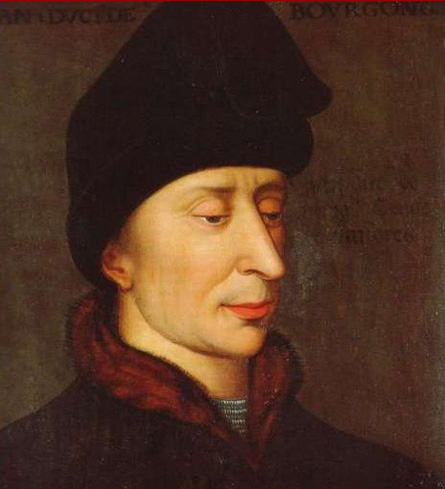
Jean the Fearless

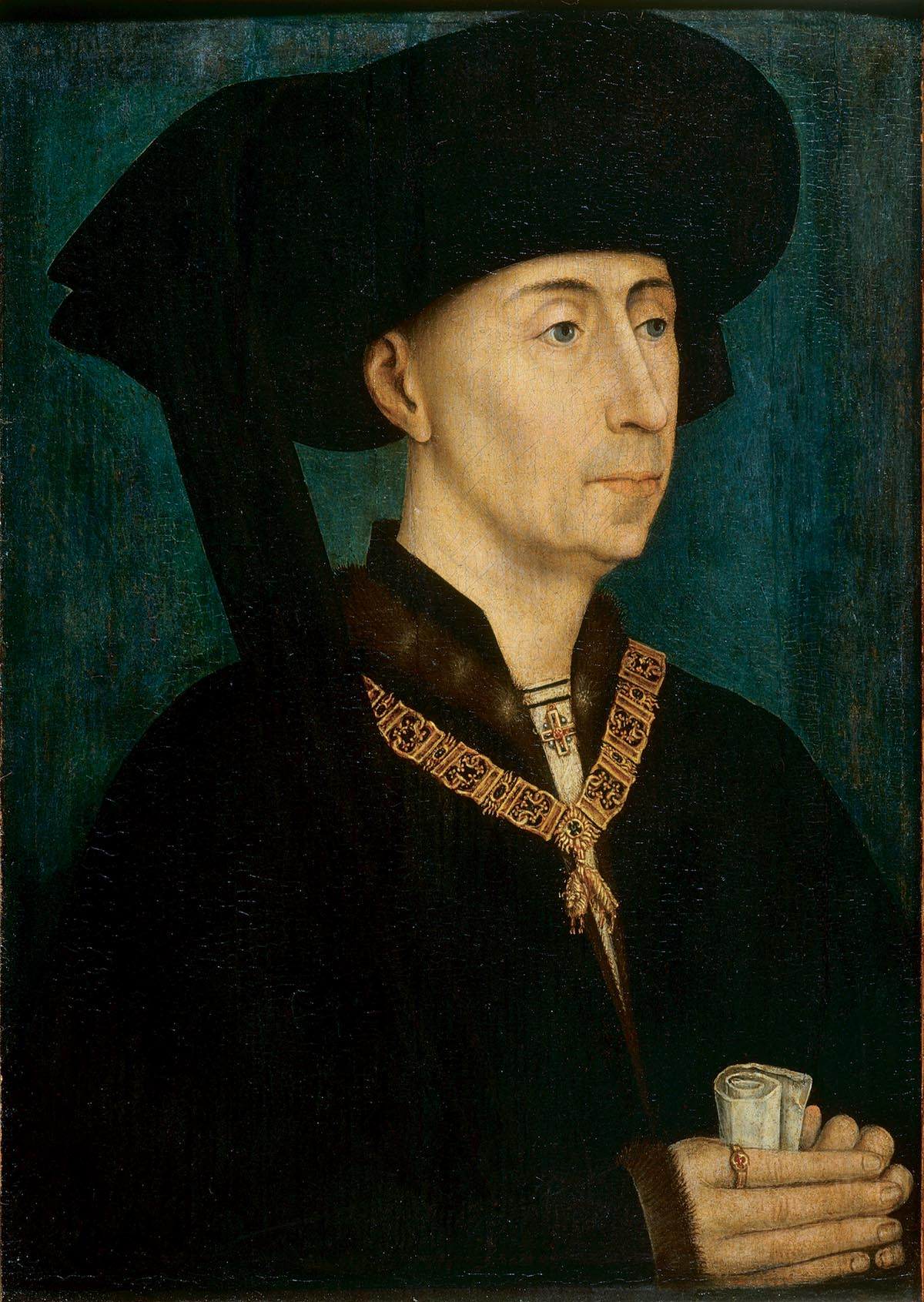
Philip the Good

Bapaume was under the control of the Dukes of Burgundy from 1383 to 1494 and it was in this city that John the Fearless took refuge after the assassination of the Duke of Orléans in 1407. It was also at Bapaume that he reunited his army to reenter the campaign on 30 January 1414. In July 1414 the King of France laid siege to Bapaume: John's garrison surrendered without fear and Charles VI then went to besiege Arras. A peace treaty was signed on 30 August and Bapaume was given to John the Fearless, but it was in such a state that on 3 September there were insufficient voters to elect aldermen. After the death of John, his son Philip the Good spent several days at the castle in 1420 and it was he who in 1437 granted the town of Bapaume two free fairs per year. A period of prosperity followed but on 4 April 1472 a terrible fire destroyed the city. It was then looted and burned by the troops of Louis XI on 7 May 1475 and again in 1477. In 1486 Charles VIII attacked Artois again and thus Bapaume. The area suffered much from the fighting between the Burgundians and the French. On 4 June 1488 fire caused further damage to the city.

=== Administration by the Netherlands ===
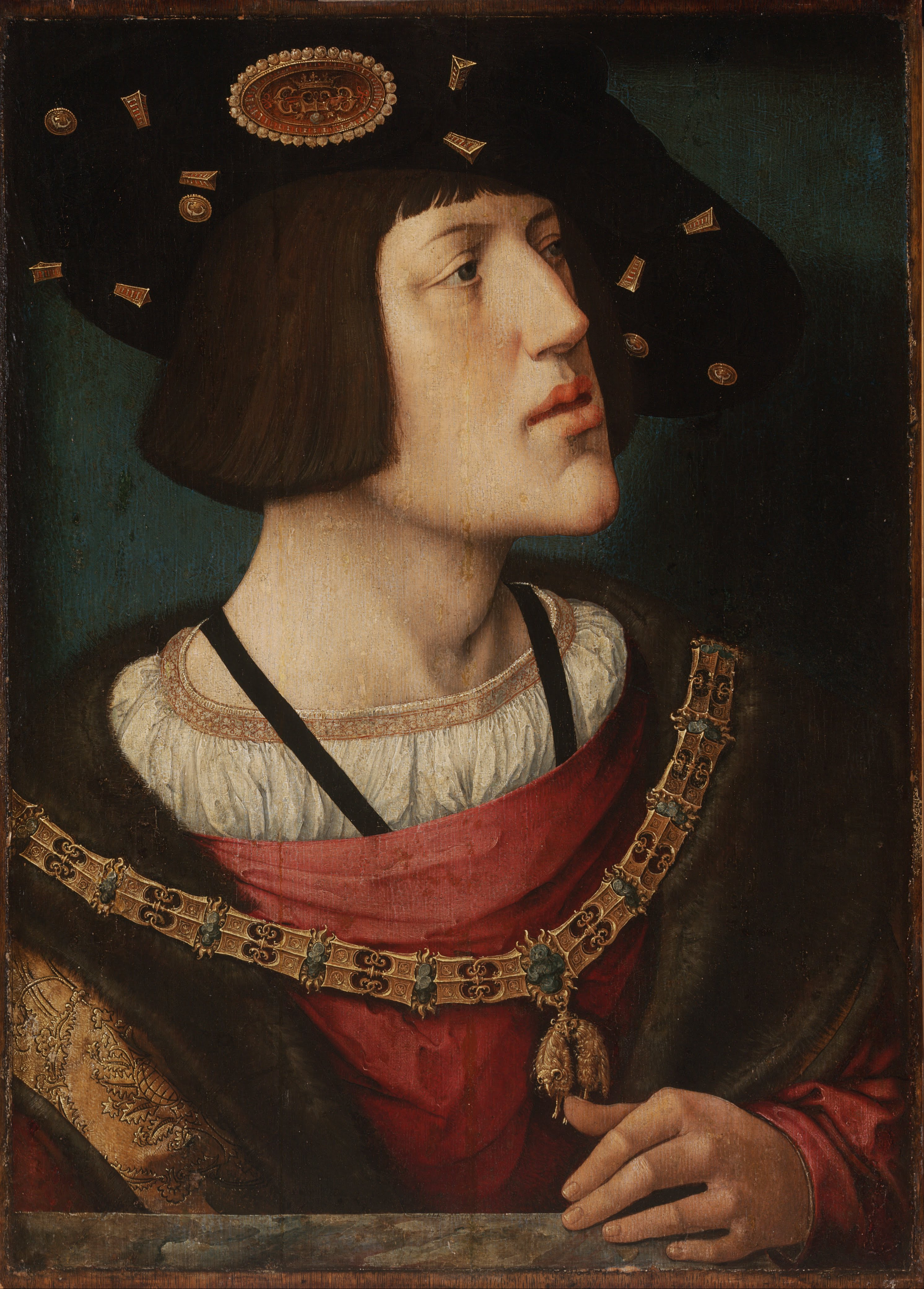
Charles V

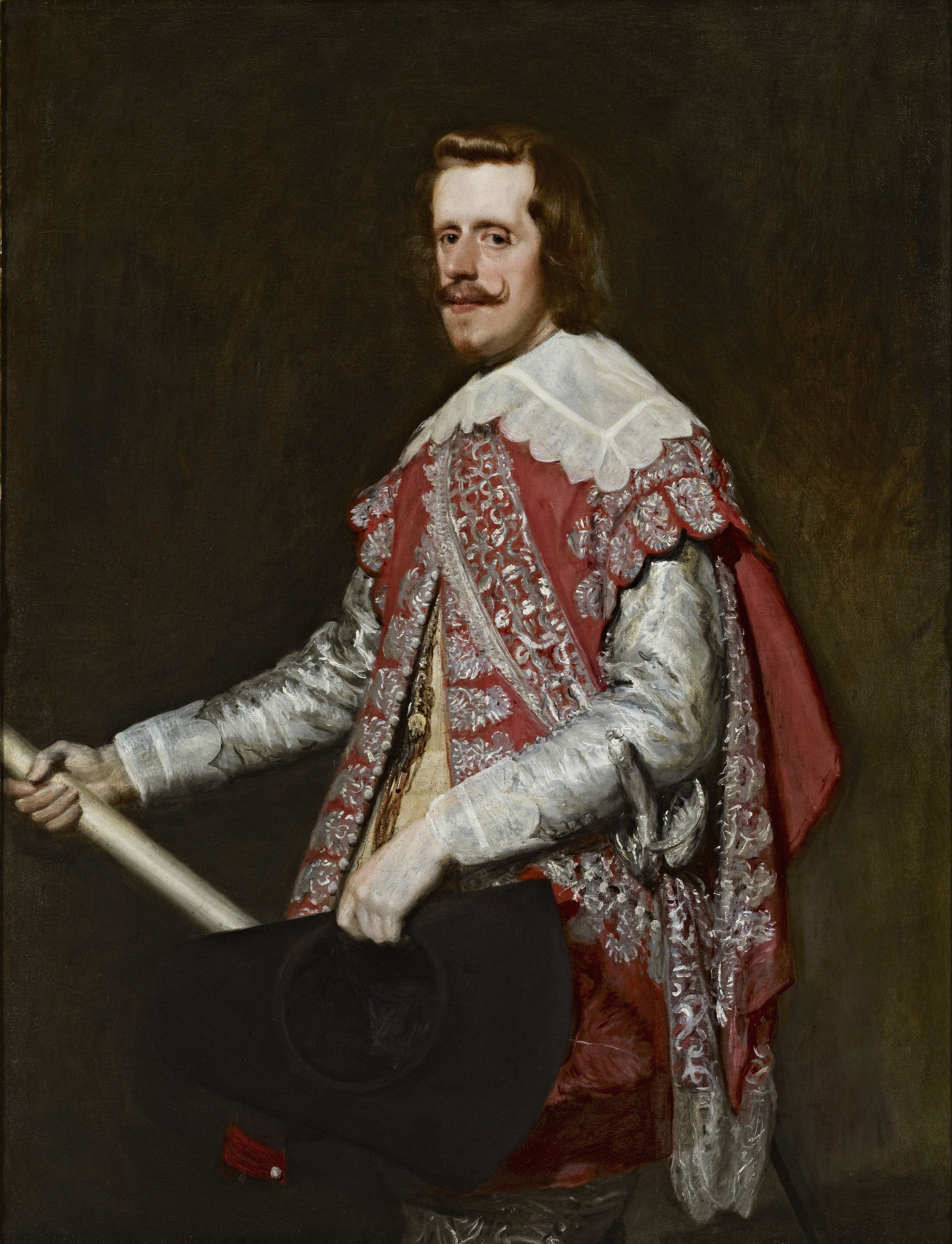
Philip IV of Spain

As a result of the Treaty of Senlis of 13 May 1493 concluded between the King of France and Maximilian of Austria, Bapaume came under the rule of the House of Austria and was administered by the governors of the Netherlands and Governors appointed by the kings of Spain until 1641. A new era of prosperity began, troubled by the attempts of Governors to restrict the privileges of the city. On 23 July 1509 Mayor Philippe Leclercq obtained a written statement of the powers of Mayors and Aldermen of Bapaume.

Bapaume suffered much from the rivalry between François I and Charles V. The city was devastated by the French on 15 October 1521 and went to Charles V in the Treaty of Madrid. It was again destroyed by fire in 1543 although in the meantime the Emperor had given the order to rebuild the castle and fortifications. The region was again ravaged by the French armies in 1554.

After an attempt to take the castle by a person called Lelievre, the residents of Bapaume ensured that the fortifications of the castle and the city were rebuilt in 1578. The period troubled by incursions and devastation lasted until 1598 when the Treaty of Vervins was signed on 2 May. An era of peace and prosperity followed, despite a plague epidemic in 1626, which ended in March 1635 when Louis XIII declared war on Philip IV of Spain. On 18 September 1641 Bapaume surrendered after a siege by the French army. This capitulation was highly celebrated in Paris since Bapaume was considered one of the main strongholds of Artois and Flanders.

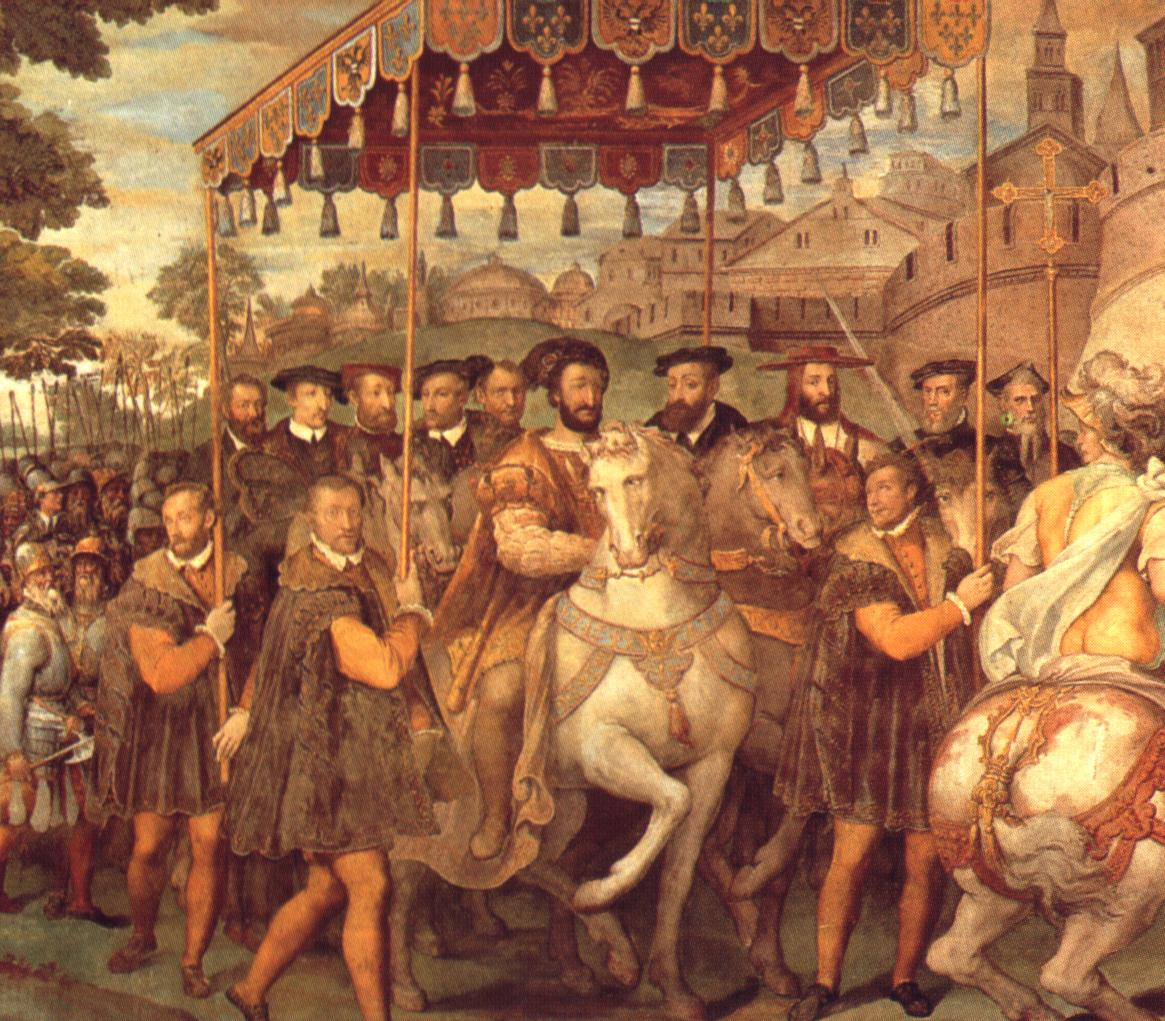
François I and Charles V entering Paris (1540)

=== Bapaume and the Kingdom of France ===
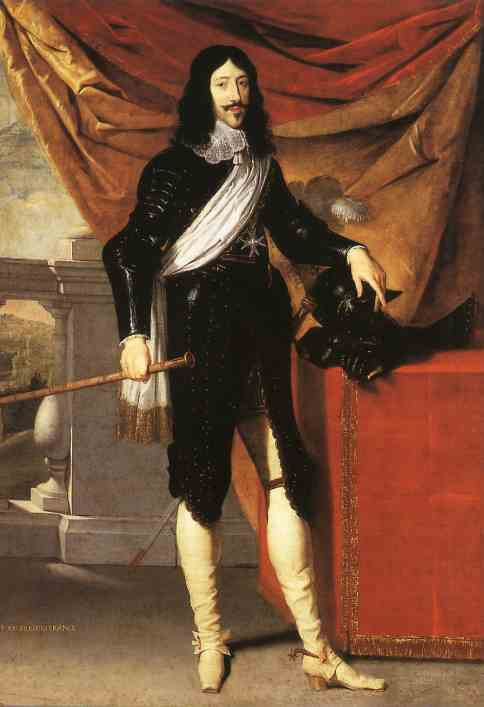
Louis XIII

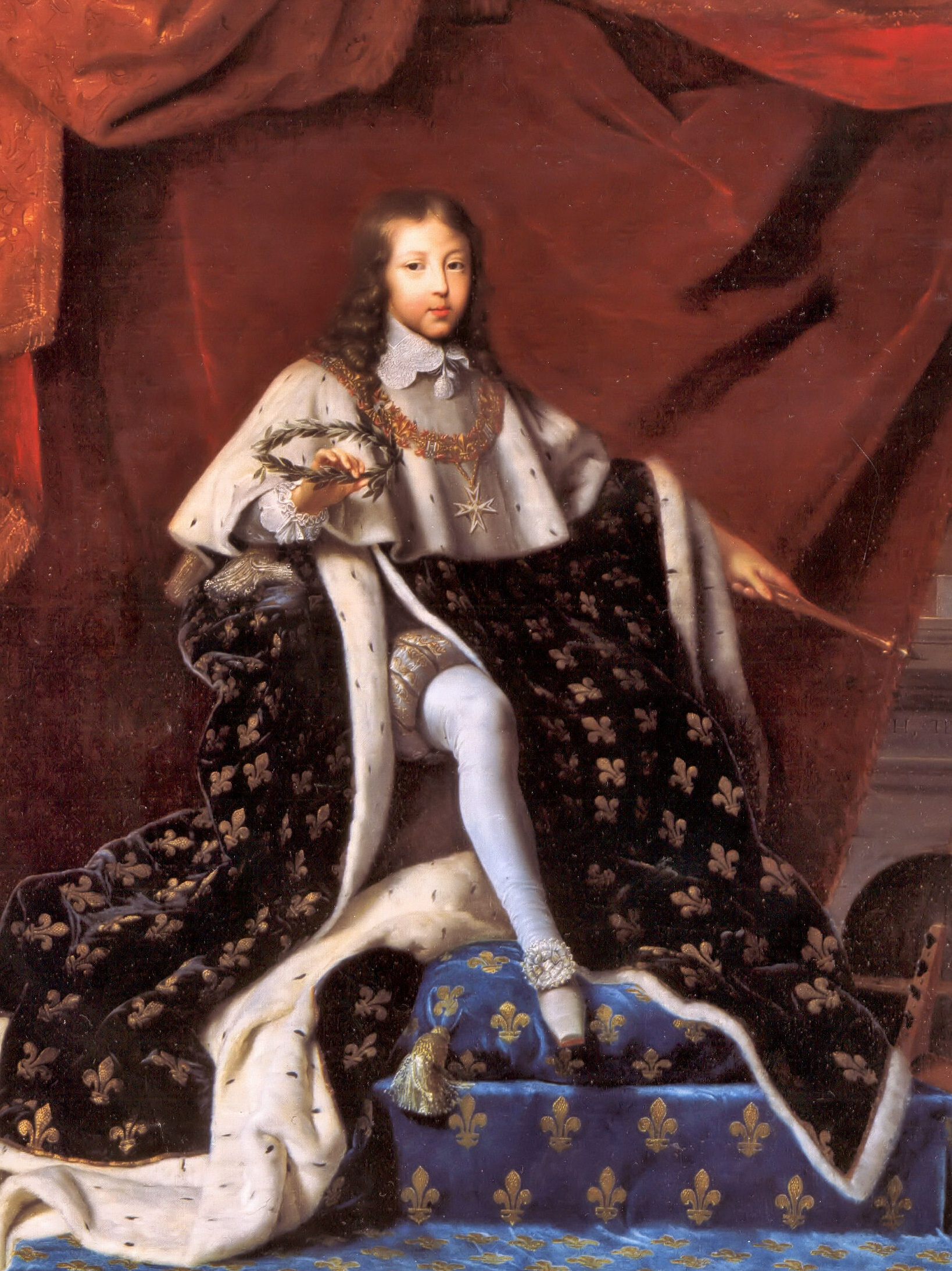
Louis XIV in 1648

Louis XIII confirmed the powers of the city in 1642. He reinforced the fortifications that had suffered during the siege. The city and the surrounding countryside still had to suffer the presence of Spanish and French armies until 1654 (Arras was taken by Louis XIV who passed through Bapaume twice in August).

The sun king passed through Bapaume several times in 1667 while returning from Flanders. On 11 May 1670 he came to review the troops stationed near the city. On 7 May 1673 he passed the night at the castle after inspecting the fortifications.

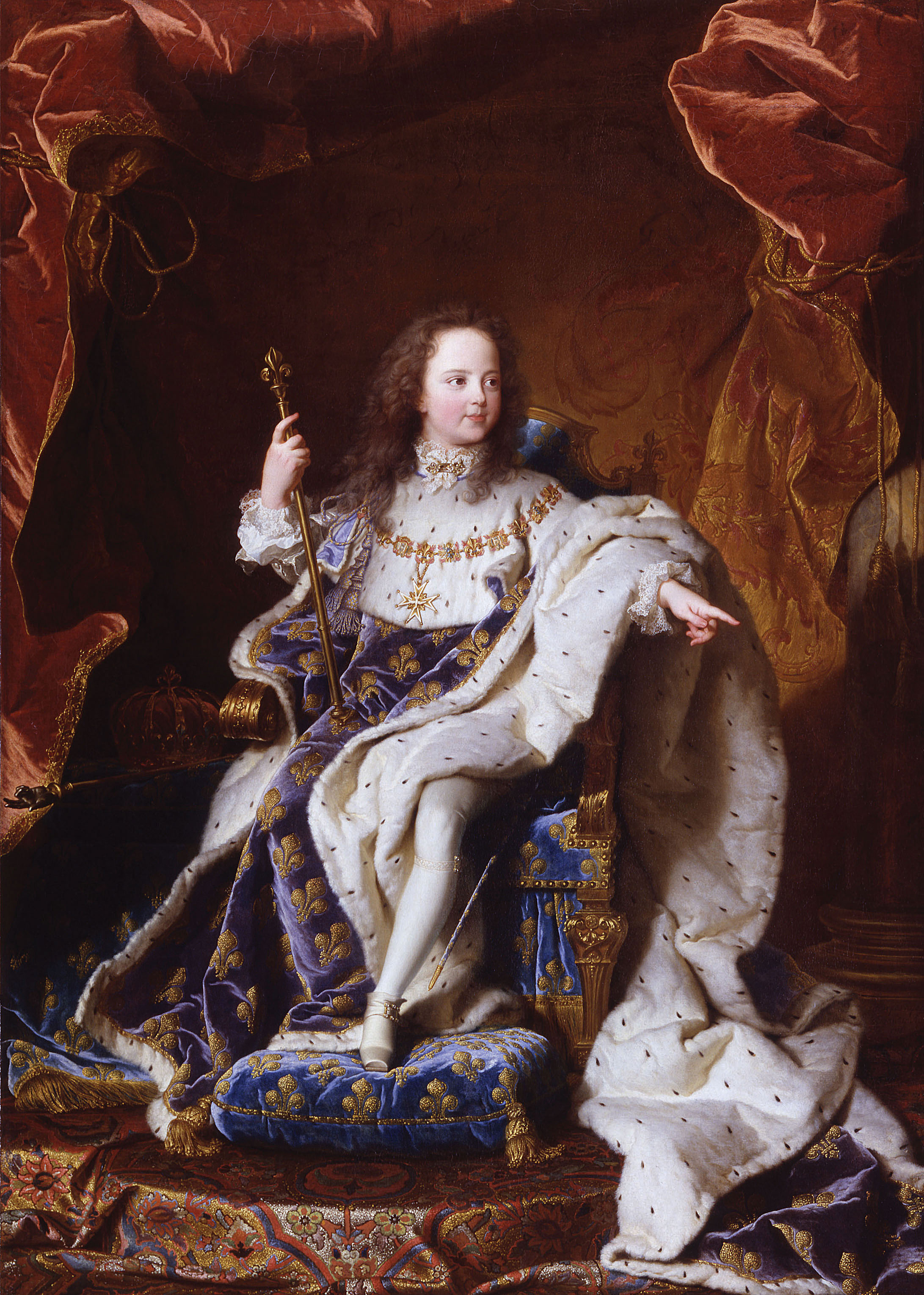
Young Louis XV

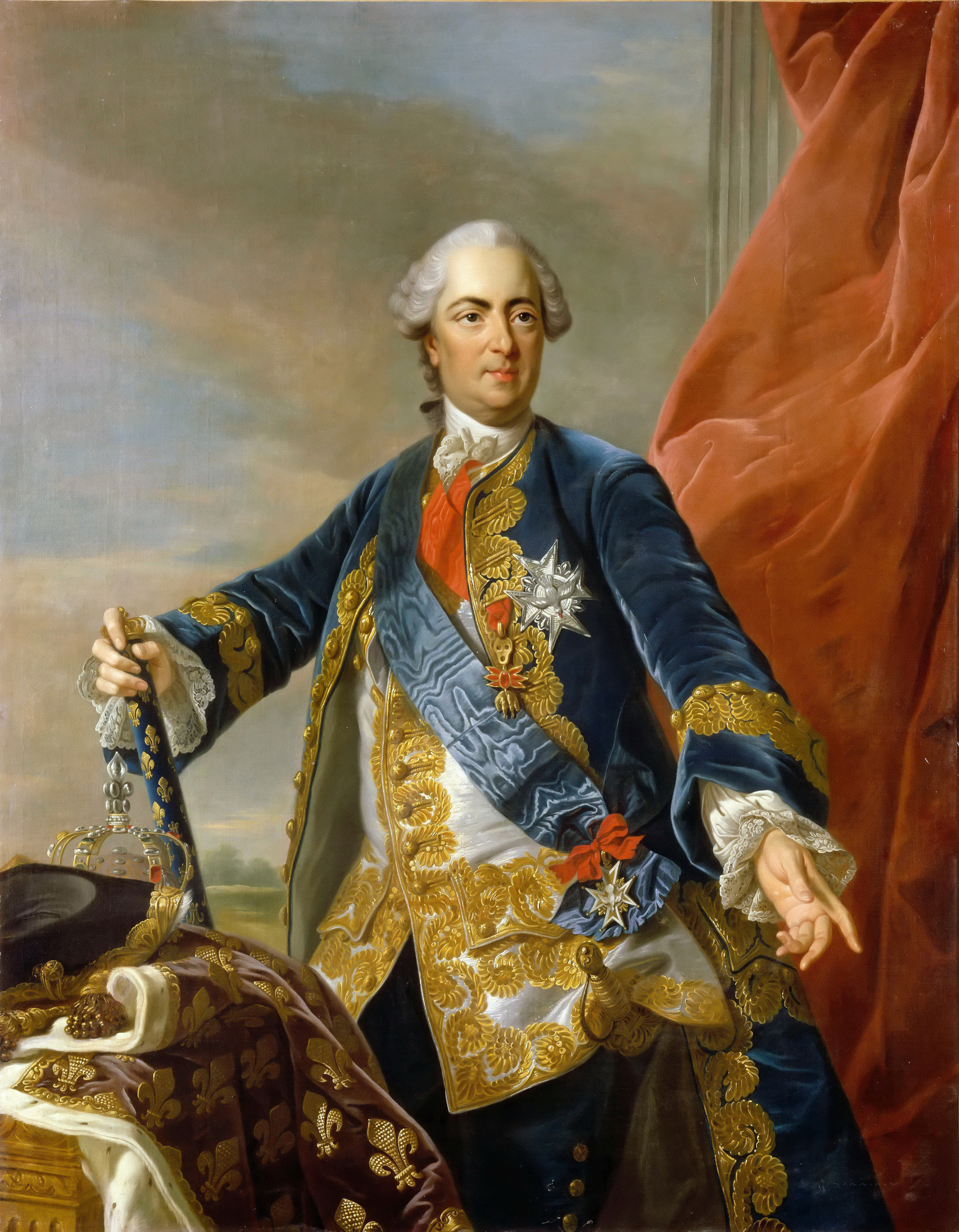
Louis XV

In 1681 Bapaume was destroyed by fire after which it was forbidden to rebuild with thatched roofs. In 1723 a statue of Louis XV on a horse was erected in the square. This was the first statue of the young monarch in France. On 24 July 1744 the king passed through Bapaume and was highly acclaimed by the people. He again passed through the city on 6 September 1745, 2 May and 11 June 1746, and 25 September 1747.

=== The Fortifications ===
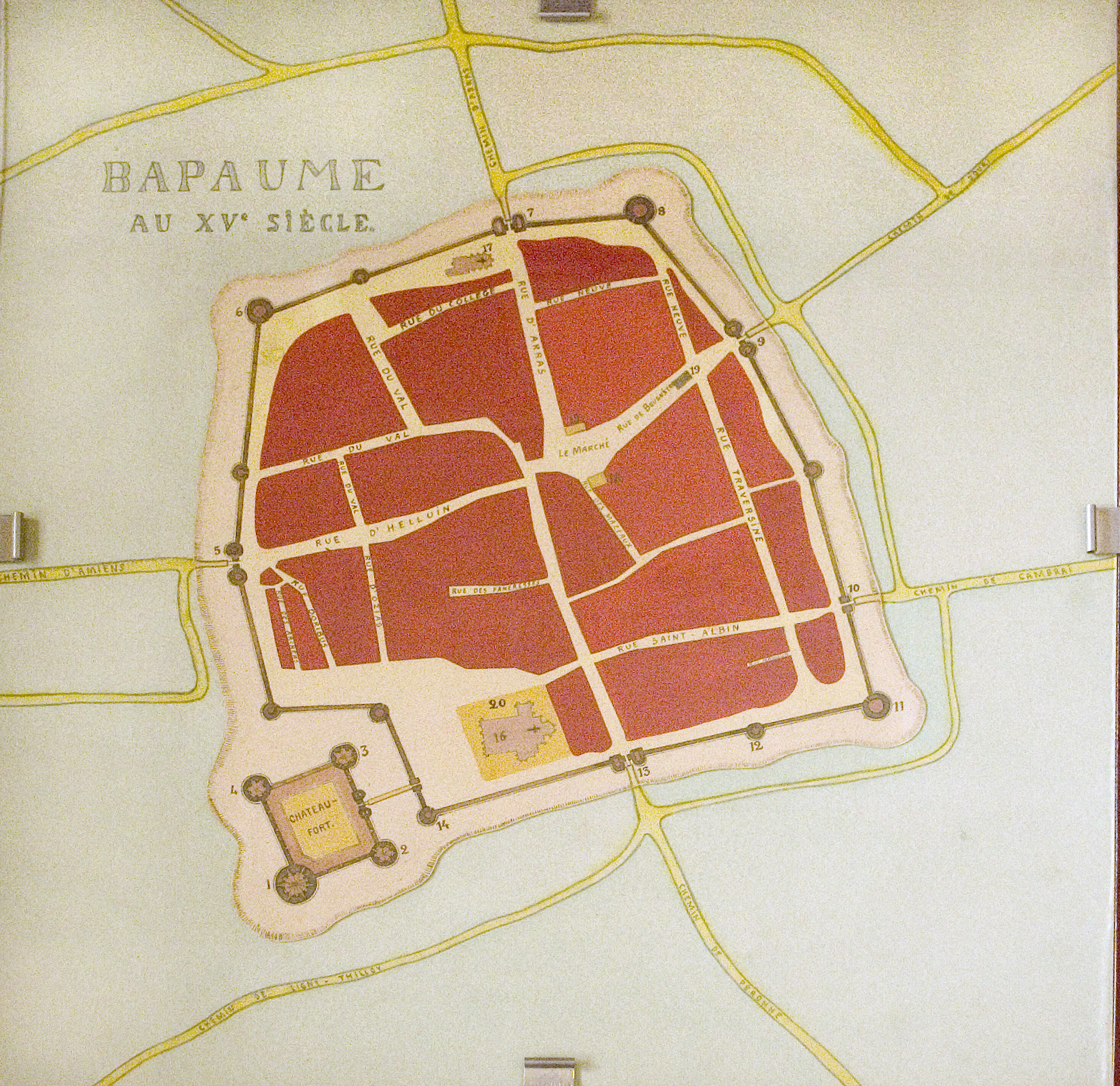
Plan of Bapaume in the 15th century

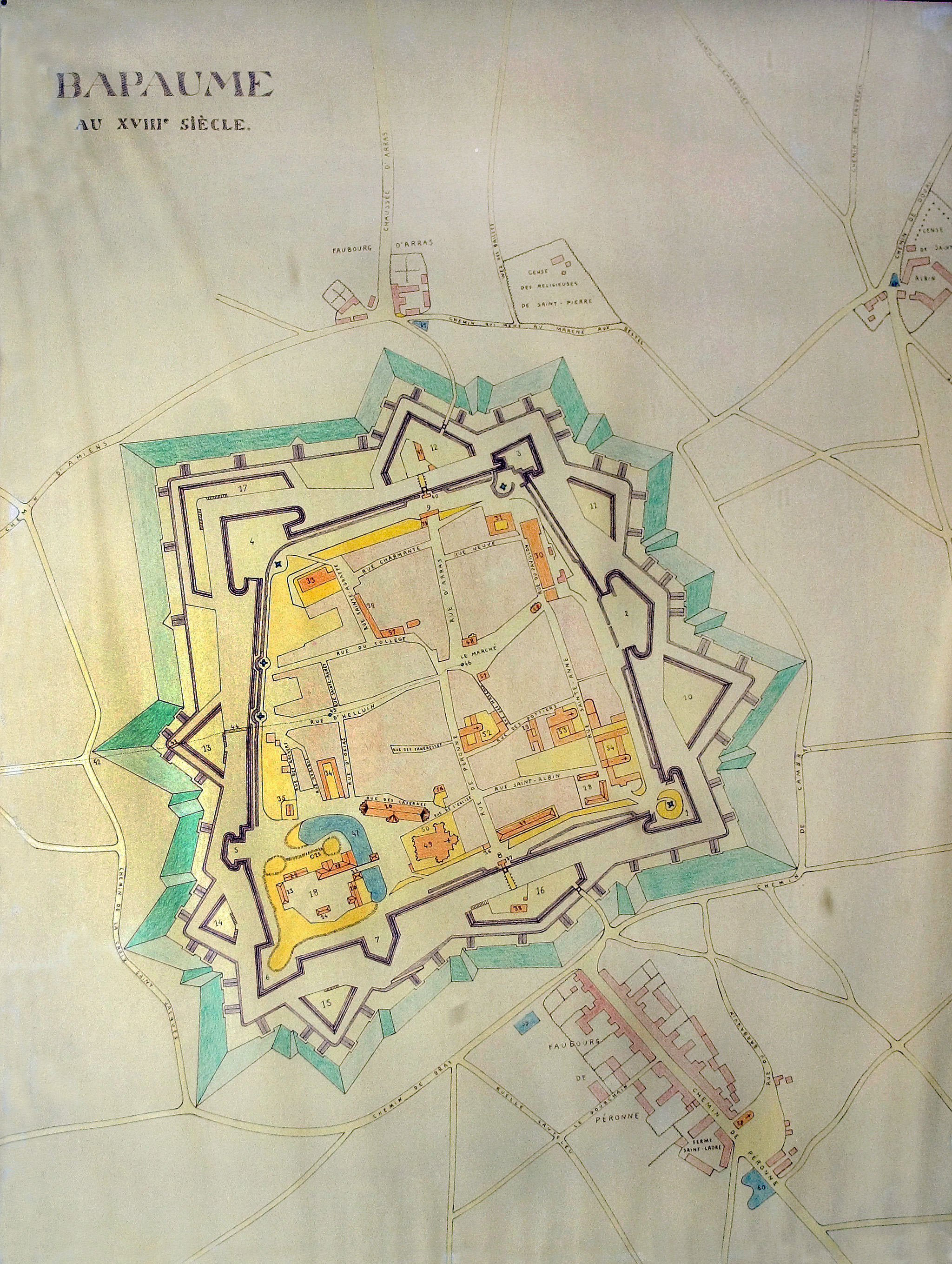
Plan of Bapaume in the 18th century

Its position subjected Bapaume to multiple wars. Defensive structures were built: first a Roman camp, then a Motte-and-bailey castle, and finally and a castle in the location of the motte. Queen Mahaut of Artois had her chamber in this castle and it seems that Joan of Arc spent one night there.

In 1335 the city itself was fortified away from the castle. These fortifications were not, however, very effective and the city was taken repeatedly. In 1540 Charles V ordered a fortified place to be built. Thick walls with bastions surrounding the city and the castle were included. In 1578 the castle and the city were united into one whole. These fortifications by Charles V were later reinforced by Vauban. Elaborate defensive systems such as mines and tunnels were built.

In 1550 Wallerand de Hauteclocque, Squire and Lord of Wail, Havernas, and Hauteclocque, was appointed by the king as lieutenant and captain of the town and castle of Bapaume.

Later Dominique de Grossolles, knight and Lord of Saint-Martin, became "Major of the town and castle of Bapaume".

In the 19th century Bapaume was not considered a walled city. The dismantling of fortifications was therefore undertaken in 1847. This was done by the Army as part of maneuvers and experiments with explosives. The walls and bastions were leveled and the ditches were filled. Only the tower and part of the Dauphin bastion are still visible.

Work has been done recently to restore the underground galleries and make them available to visit: firstly, the Bastion of Reyne south-east of the city and then, on the other side, the Dauphin Bastion. These tunnels served as shelter during the two world wars.

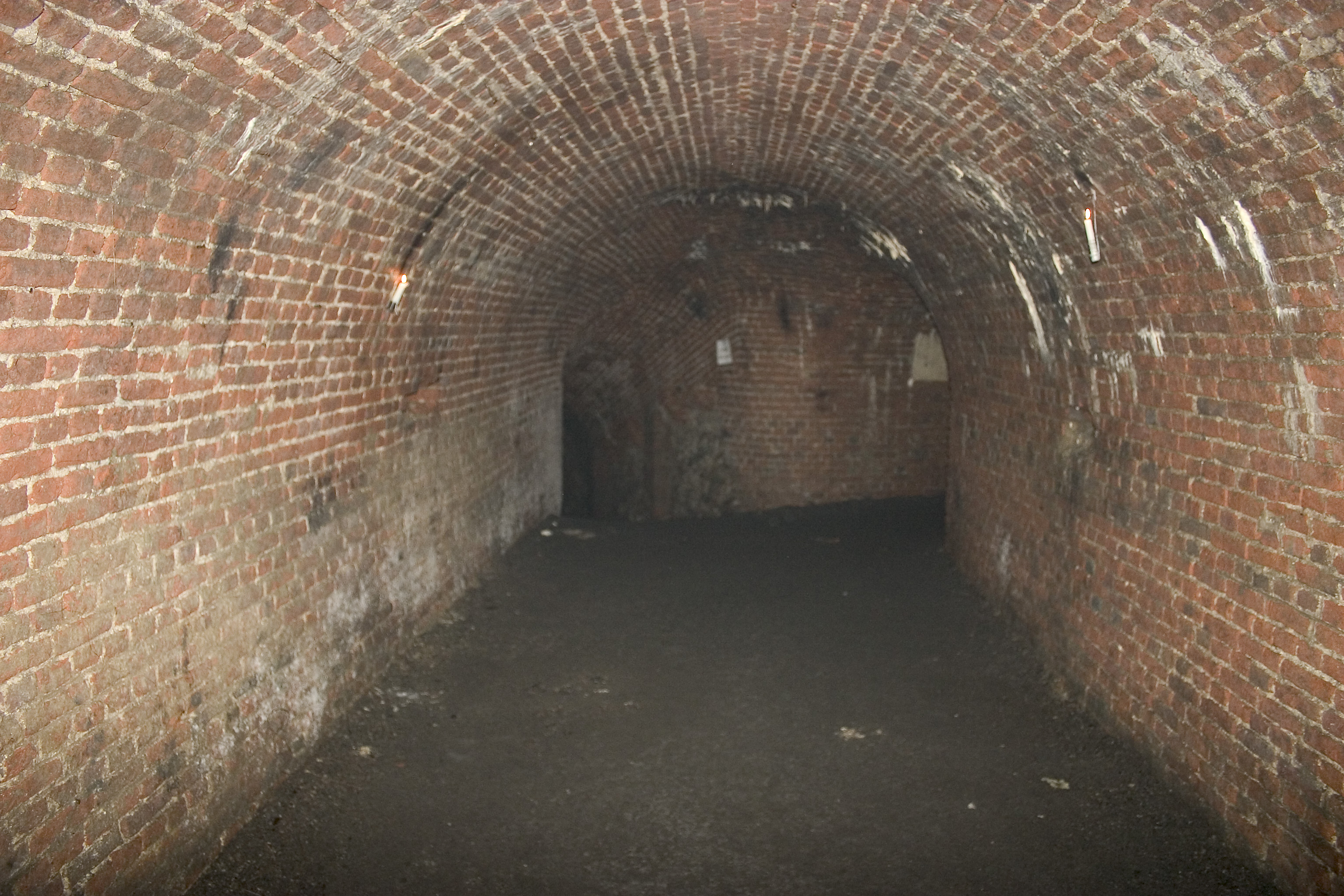
A mine gallery in the Reyne bastion

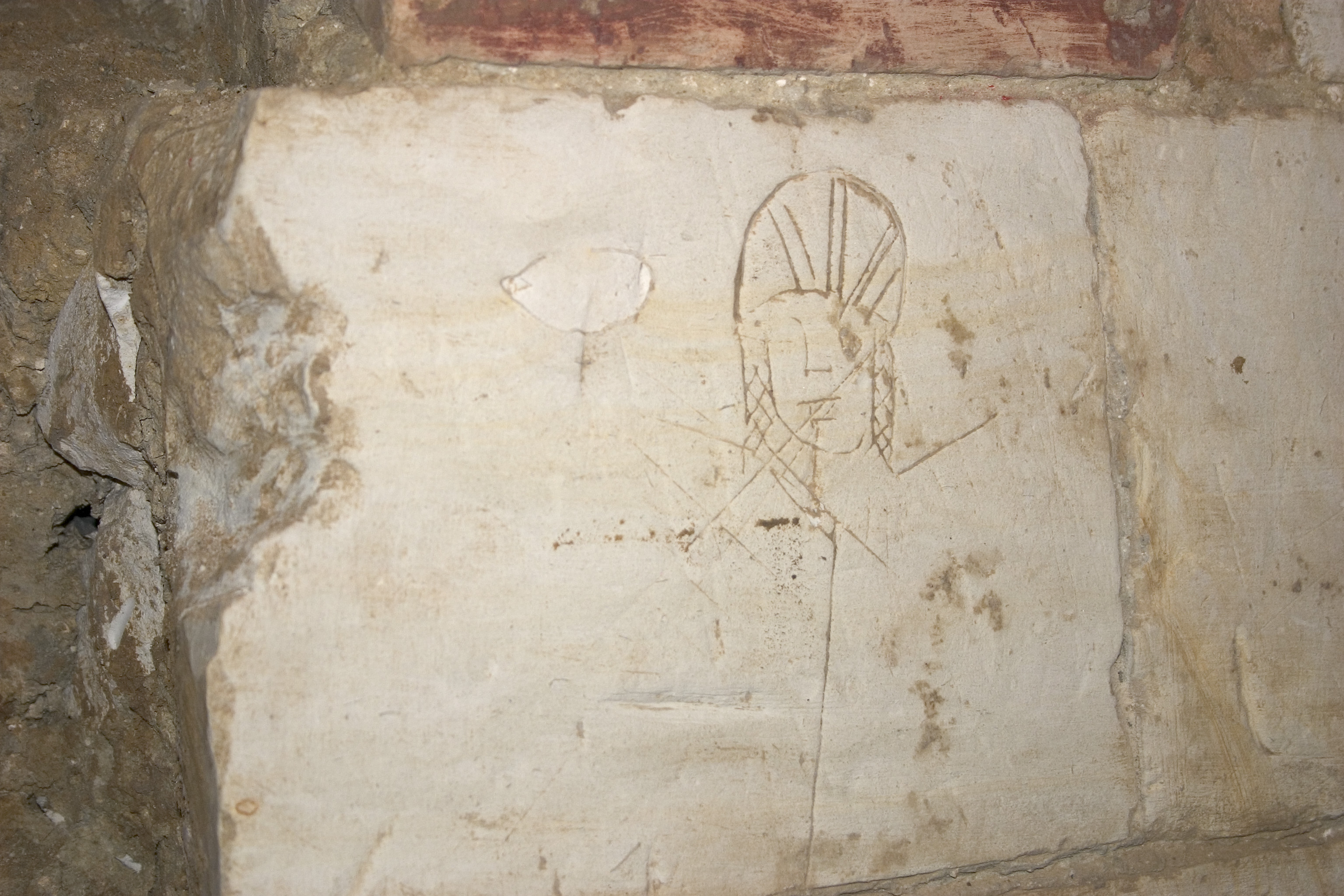
Engraved stone in the Dauphin bastion

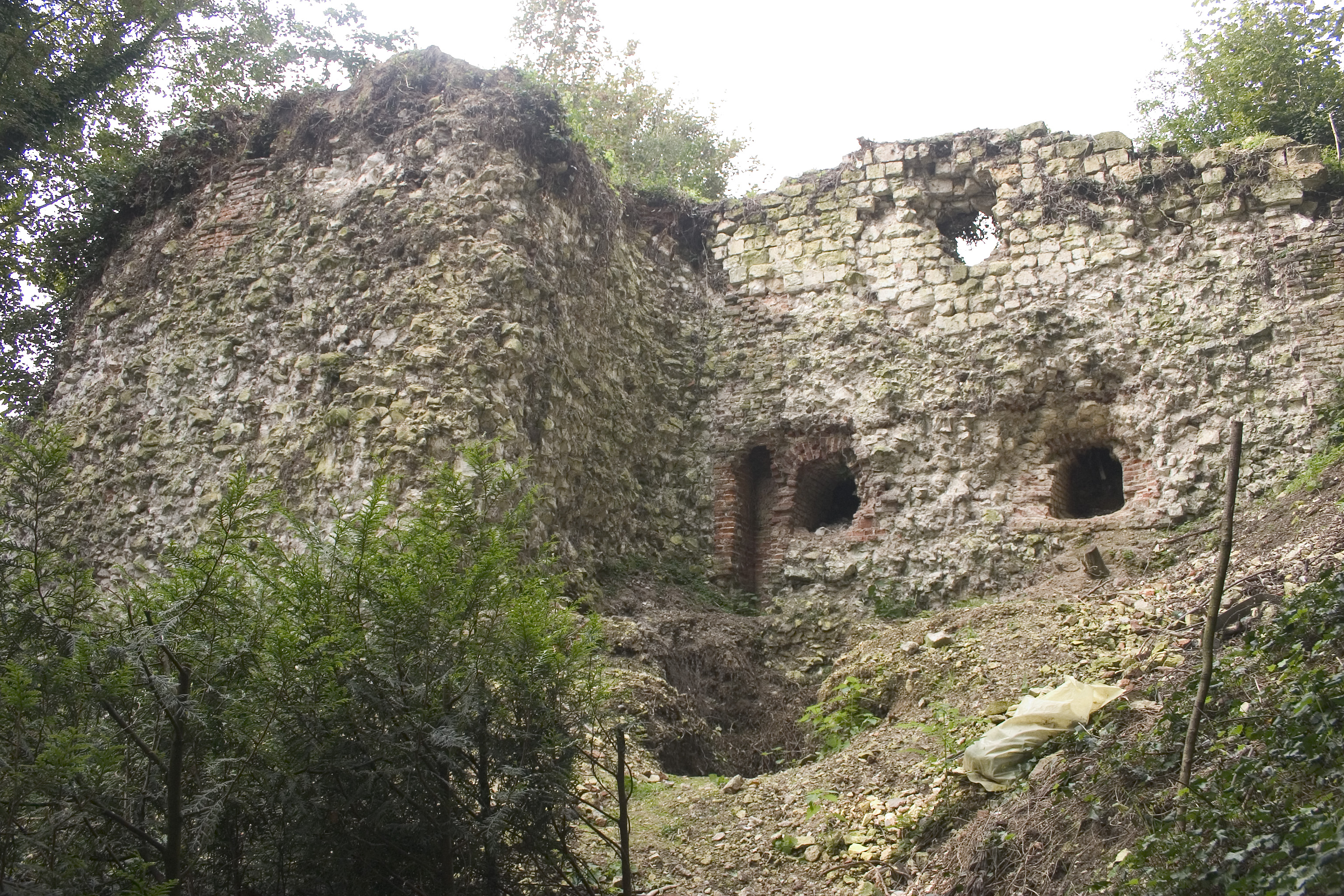
The Dauphin Bastion

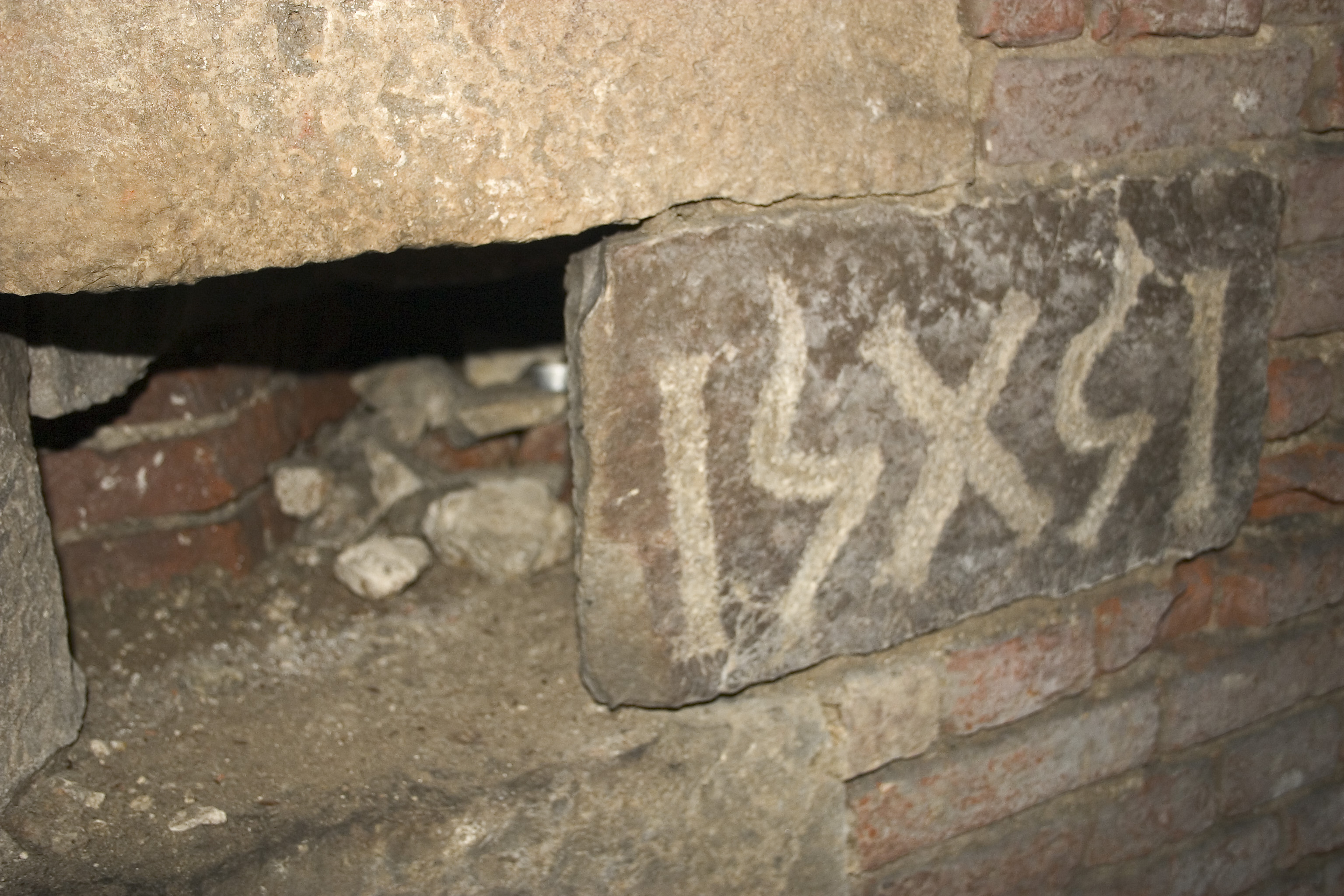
Stone at the entrance of a mine network from 1551

=== The French Revolution ===
Bapaume society was transformed during the French Revolution. During the Terror, the Castle was not sufficient to imprison citizens suspected of not being favourable to the Revolution. Homes vacated by residents who had fled were requisitioned to serve as prisons.

Joseph Le Bon came to the commune revive the actions of the revolutionary committee.

The city was the capital of the district from 1790 to 1795.

=== The Battle of Bapaume on 2 and 3 January 1871 ===
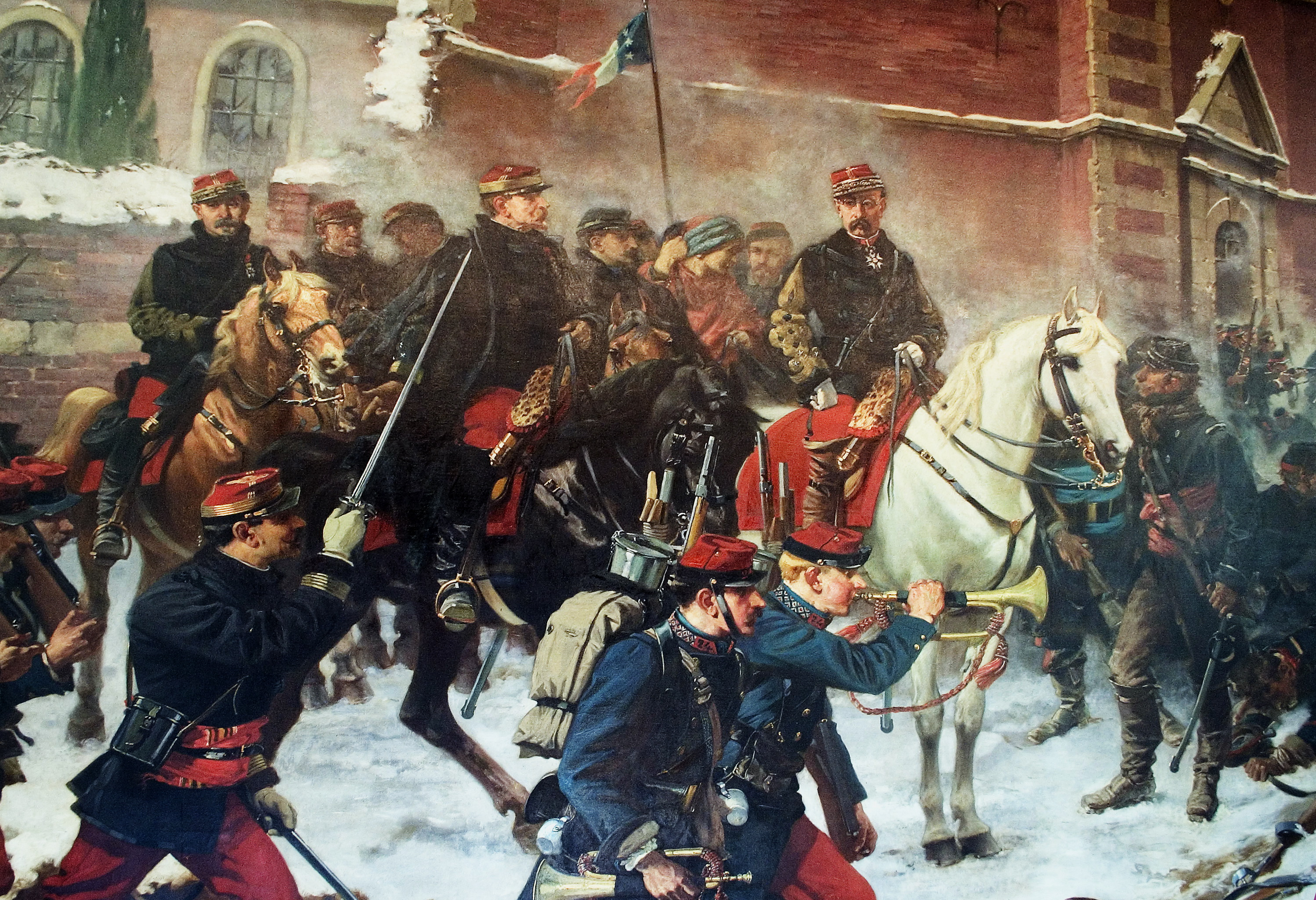
Part of a painting by Armand Dumaresq of the Battle of Bapaume

The Battle of Bapaume was fought on 2 and 3 January 1871 during the Franco-Prussian War of 1870 on the territories of Biefvillers-lès-Bapaume and Bapaume.

General Louis Léon César Faidherbe at the head of the Northern Army stopped the Prussians.

=== World War I ===
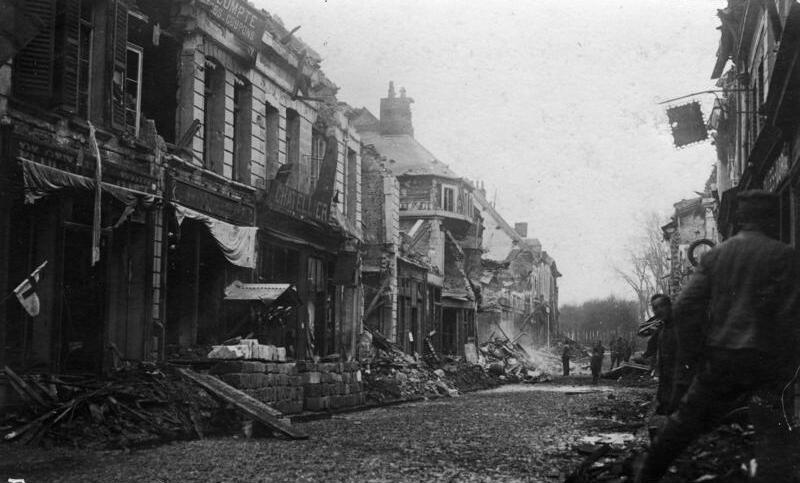
The Town Centre in 1916

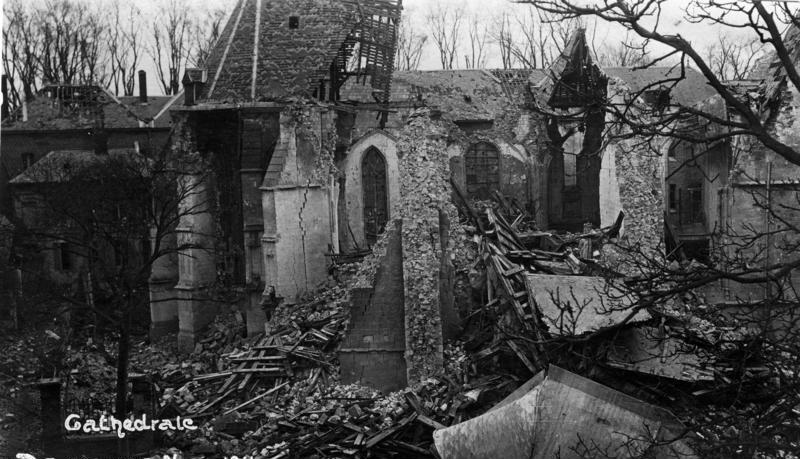
Bapaume Church demolished by shelling in 1916

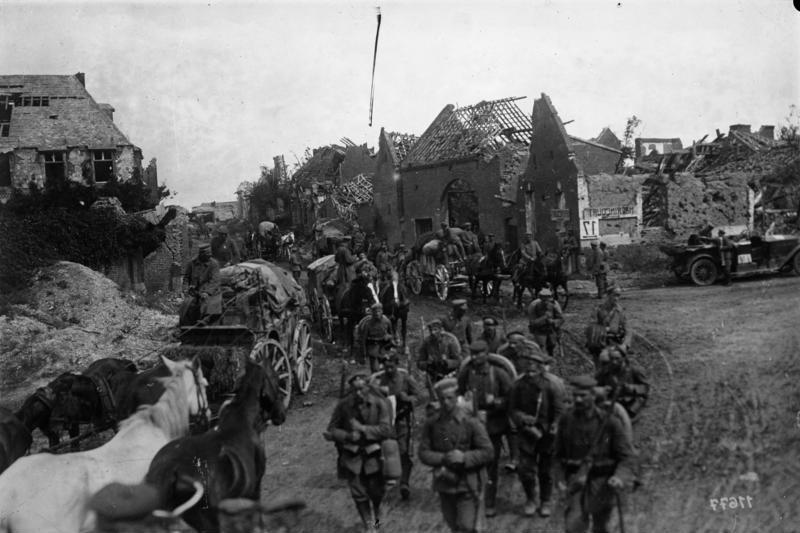
German troops leave Bapaume in August 1918

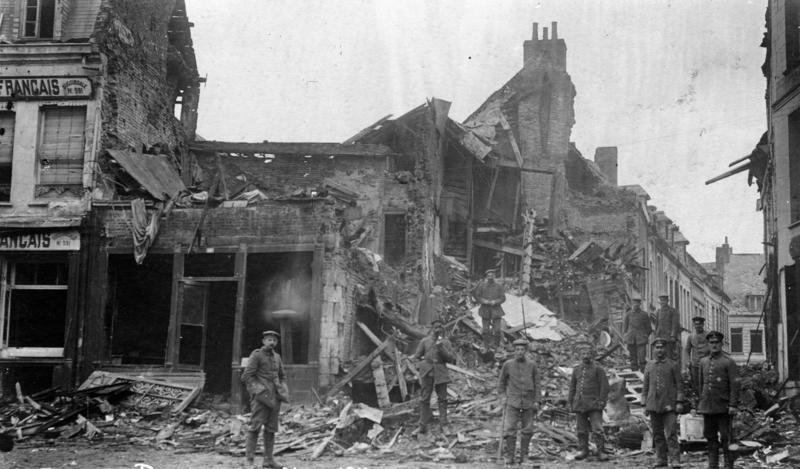
The Town Centre in 1916

In 1916 Bapaume was one of the cities considered to be strategic objectives by the allies in the framework of the Battle of the Somme. Bapaume was occupied by the Germans on 26 September 1914 then by the British on 17 March 1917. The town hall was destroyed on 25 March by a delayed action mine left by the Germans, killing 24 people including Australian soldiers and two French members of parliament.

On 24 March 1918, the Germans took over the city again.

In 1918 the Second Battle of Bapaume, 21 August–3 September, was part of the second phase of the Battle of Amiens, the British and Commonwealth attack that was the turning point of the First World War on the Western Front and the beginning of the Allies' Hundred Days Offensive. Improved armoured support and artillery bombardment weakened once impregnable positions and helped the Allied forces tear holes through trench lines. On 29 August the New Zealand Division, after heavy fighting, occupied Bapaume, having broken through, with the British 5th Infantry Division, the very strong Le Transloy-Loupart trench system and having overcome many other strong points around the town.

The Germans set up a trap in the town hall with a mine and a timer which exploded just before the arrival of the Australians. The First Battle of Bapaume ran from 24 to 25 March 1918 and the Second Battle of Bapaume from 21 August to 3 September 1918.

After the armistice the slow and dangerous work of demining began. The city was classified as a red zone and major work was done for reconstruction. The English city of Sheffield provided assistance for reconstruction.

There remains from this time a war memorial and two military cemeteries that also have graves from the Second World War:

- The Bapaume Communal Cemetery
- The Bapaume Australian Cemetery houses the remains of 88 soldiers from 1914 to 1918 at a place called the Pré Pot de Chart. This is a cemetery which was created in March 1917 by the 3rd Australian Casualty Clearing Station. It was closed in June 1917 then after that 23 German bodies were added in April and May 1918.

Bapaume church was demolished by shelling in 1916

=== World War II ===
During World War II Bapaume was again an area of intense fighting. The mayor, Abel Guidet, was a member of the Resistance and was arrested and deported to the camp of Gross-Rosen where he died on 27 November 1944.

Since 1948 there has been a monument showing the moment of his arrest to honour his memory. At the Town Hall are an urn with soil from Groß-Rosen and a painting featuring the mayor.

=== Heraldry ===
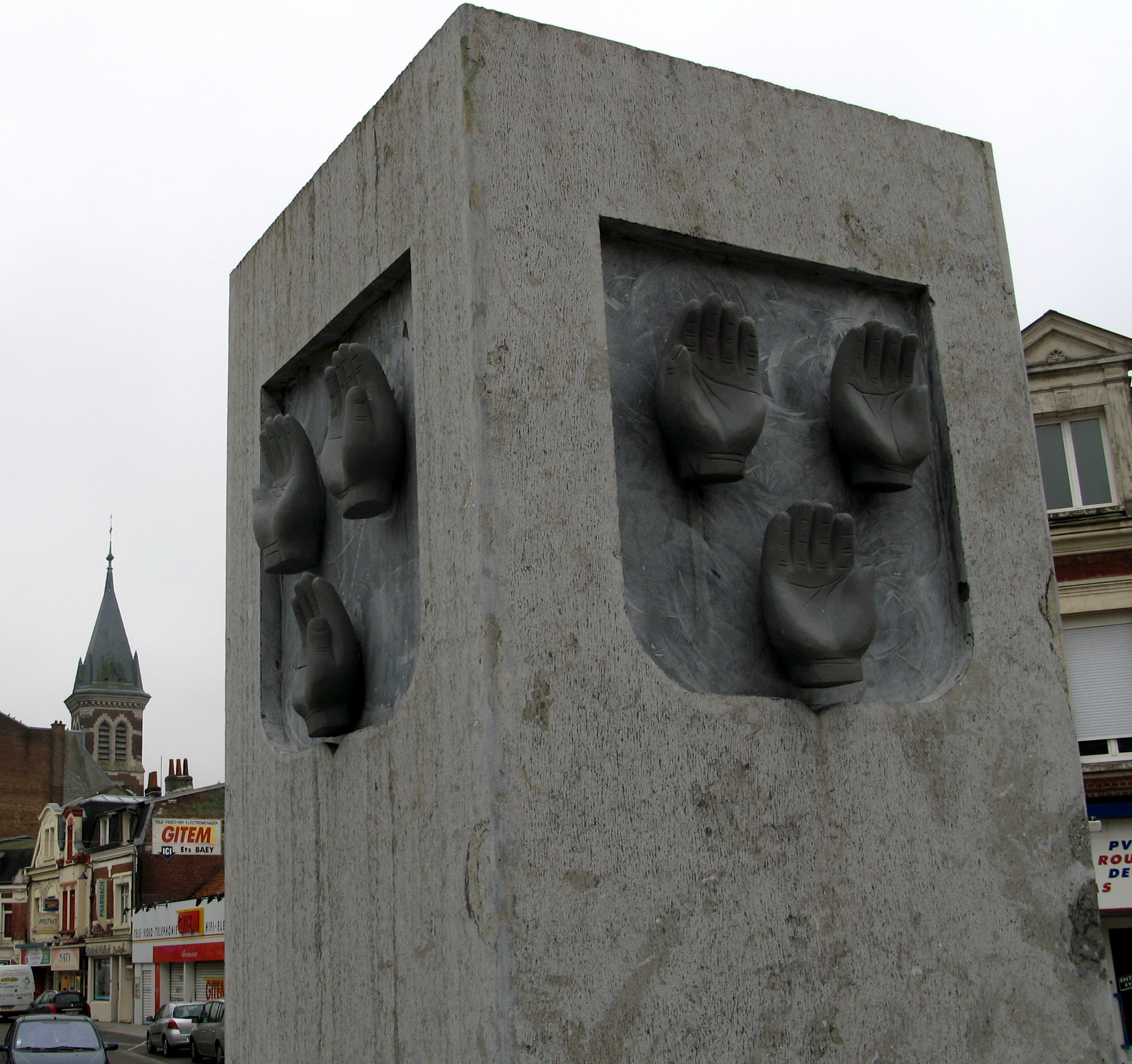
The three hands, symbol of the city, at the centre of the roundabout

Arms of Bapaume	Blazon: Azure, 3 hands appaummee of Argent 2 and 1, the hand at dexter chief a hand sinister with 2 hands dexter. These are Canting arms.

== Administration ==
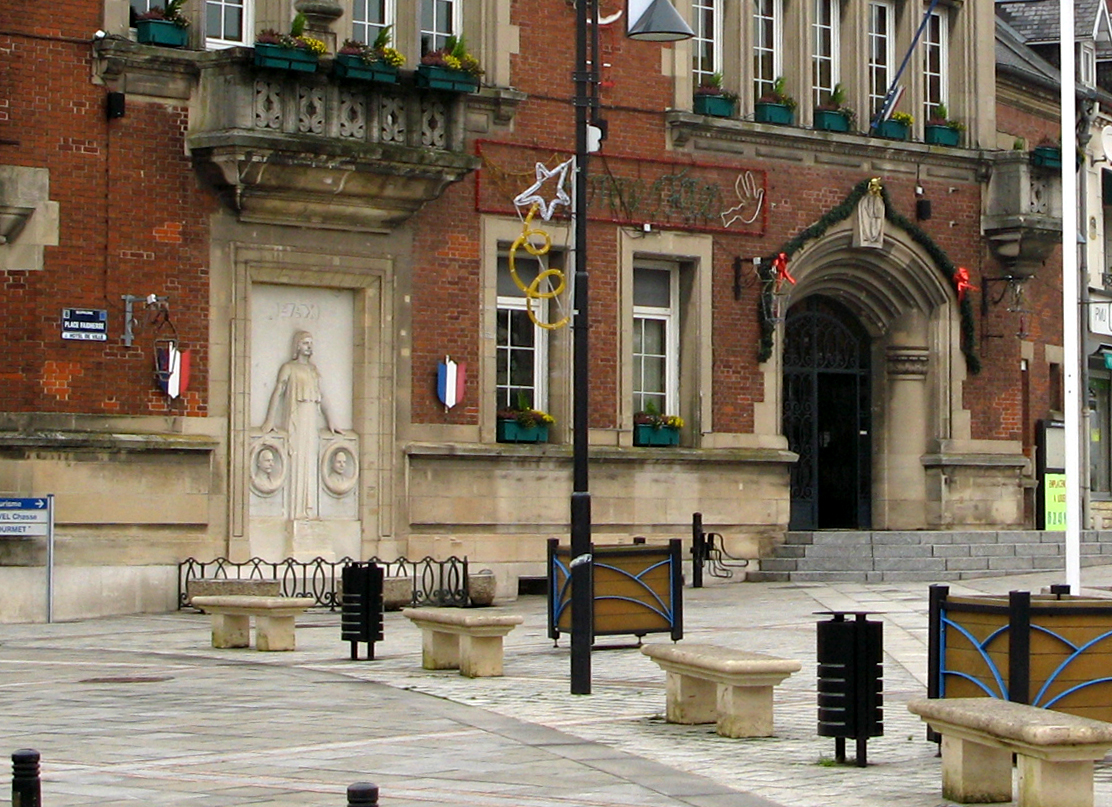
The Town Hall façade

List of Successive Mayors

From	To	Name	Party	Position
1642		Jehan Camier		
1870	1881	Martial Alexandre Pajot		
1893	1903	Marcelin Gaudefroy		
1920	1929	Gaston Stenne		
1929	1940	Abel Guidet		
1945	1965	Léonce Verdel		
1965	1980	Henri Guidet		
1982	2002	Jean Paul Joseph Delevoye	RPR	
2002	2004	Anne Duez		
2004	2014	Jean Paul Joseph Delevoye	UMP	
2014	2026	Jean-Jacques Cottel		MP (2012–?), Former mayor of Beaulencourt (1995–2014)

== Twin towns – sister cities ==
Bapaume is twinned with:

- Moers, Germany (since 1974)
- Anstruther, Scotland, United Kingdom (since 1991)

In addition to its twin town, Bapaume has also friendly relations with Sheffield, England, United Kingdom (since 1920).

== Demography ==
The inhabitants of this commune are known as Bapalmois or Bapalmoises in French.

Historical population

Year	Pop.	±% p.a.
1793	3,492	—
1800	3,214	−1.18%
1806	3,084	−0.69%
1821	3,060	−0.05%
1831	3,189	+0.41%
1836	3,122	−0.42%
1841	3,210	+0.56%
1846	3,158	−0.33%
1851	3,265	+0.67%
1856	3,189	−0.47%
1861	3,149	−0.25%
1866	3,174	+0.16%
1872	3,059	−0.61%
1876	3,274	+1.71%
1881	3,335	+0.37%
1886	3,291	−0.27%
1891	3,001	−1.83%
1896	3,144	+0.94%
1901	3,113	−0.20%

Year	Pop.	±% p.a.
1906	2,946	−1.10%
1911	2,917	−0.20%
1921	2,112	−3.18%
1926	2,947	+6.89%
1931	2,782	−1.15%
1936	2,833	+0.36%
1946	2,748	−0.30%
1954	3,221	+2.01%
1962	3,275	+0.21%
1968	3,575	+1.47%
1975	3,689	+0.45%
1982	3,524	−0.65%
1990	3,509	−0.05%
1999	4,331	+2.37%
2007	4,132	−0.59%
2012	4,009	−0.60%
2017	3,887	−0.62%
2023	3,779	−0.47%

Source: EHESS and INSEE

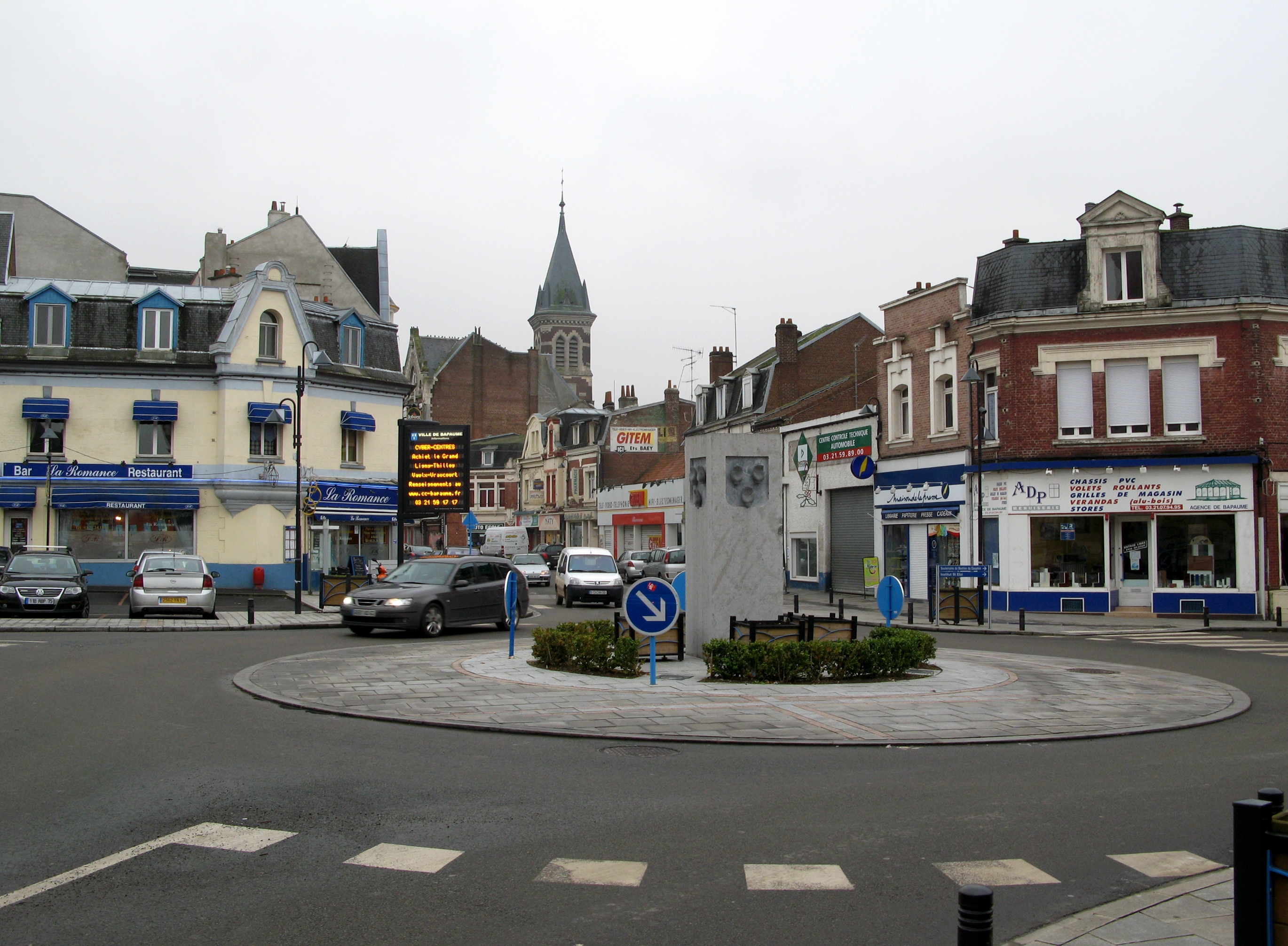
The roundabout at the centre of town

== Economy ==
There is a Centre of Detention which is particularly known for being the last detention centre that hosted Lucien Léger (1937–2008) who was the oldest prisoner in France (and Europe) and stayed there for several years until his release in 2005.

== Sites and monuments ==
=== The Town Hall and belfry ===
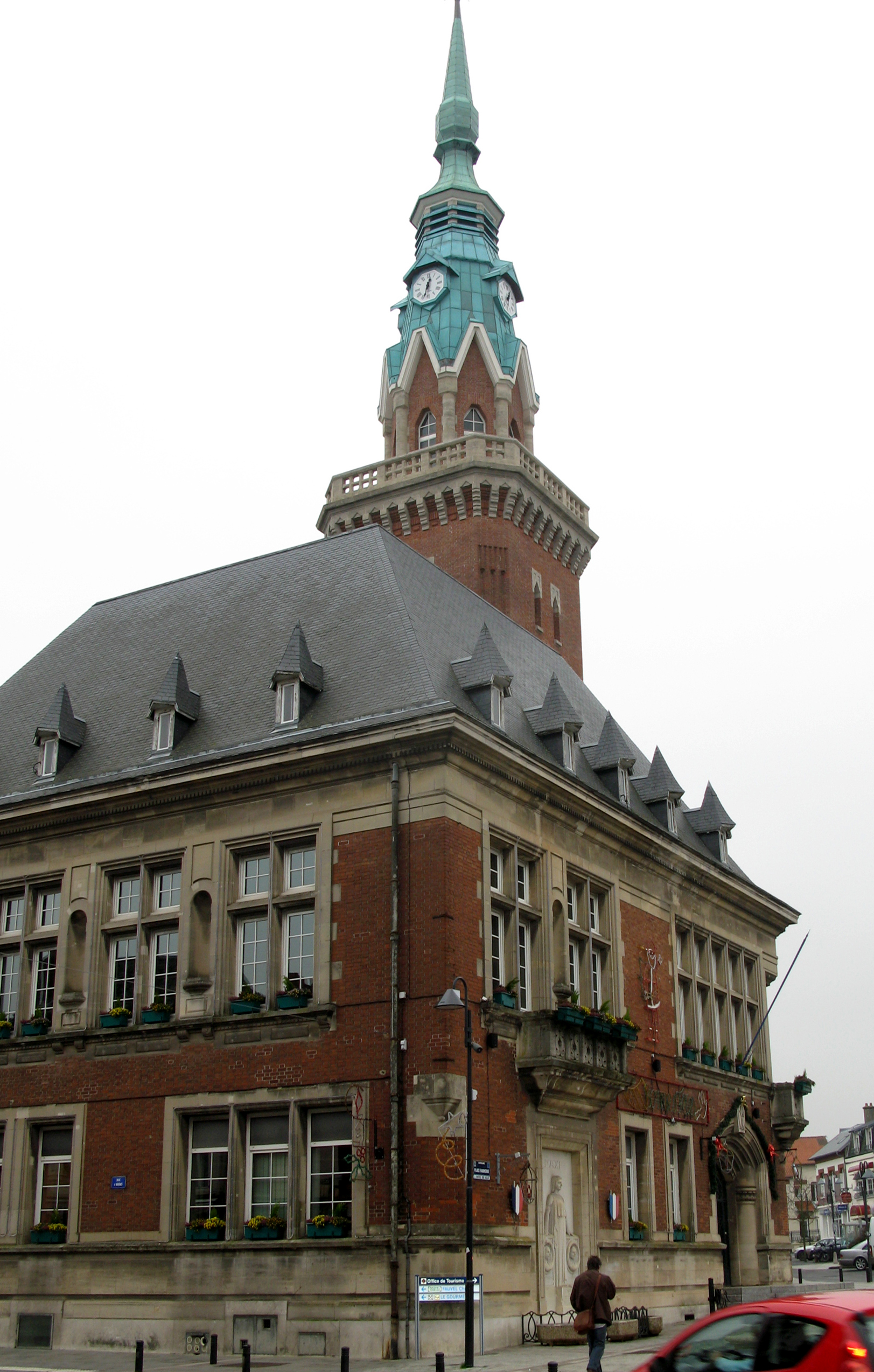
The Town Hall and Belfry

The town hall with its current belfry was built in 1931 and 1932 with architecture similar to the previous building built in 1610 and destroyed in 1917. The first belfry was built in the 12th century according to charters that had been issued to the city of Bapaume. Subsequently, the building became too small and aldermen obtained permission to extend it in 1374. Because of the wars that followed the belfry became dangerous and was demolished in 1537. A new belfry was started in 1583 but after many vicissitudes the building was built then destroyed and it was Philip II of Spain in 1590 who authorized the construction of a new building which was completed in 1610. It had columns and arches on the façade similar to the Arras Town Hall. For its construction the Bapaume aldermen had authorisation to establish a right of passage.

=== The statue of General Faidherbe ===
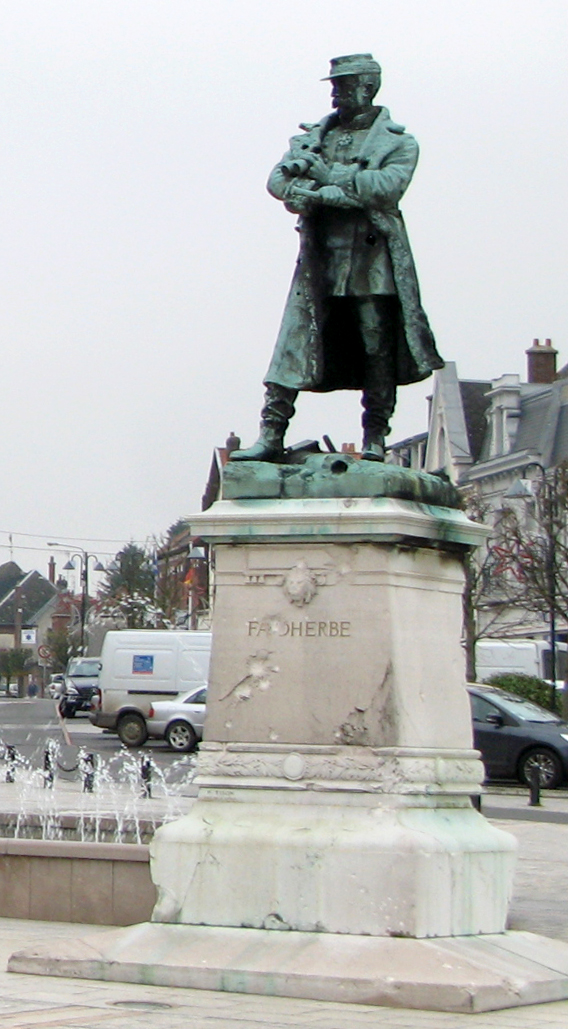
The Statue of General Faidherbe

A statue of Louis Faidherbe was dedicated on 27 September 1891 and originally sculpted by Louis Noël. On 29 September 1916 the statue was requisitioned by the Germans who believed it was bronze and the statue disappeared. The pedestal, pitted by shrapnel, remained empty for 13 years. It was not until 1926 that the town decided to ask the sculptor Déchin, stepson of Louis Noël, from Paris to recreate the statue from the original plans. The new monument was inaugurated on 18 August 1929 by Paul Painlevé, Minister of War. During the redevelopment of the square in 1997 the statue was moved a few metres lower on 26 September.

=== Monument to Briquet and Taillandier ===
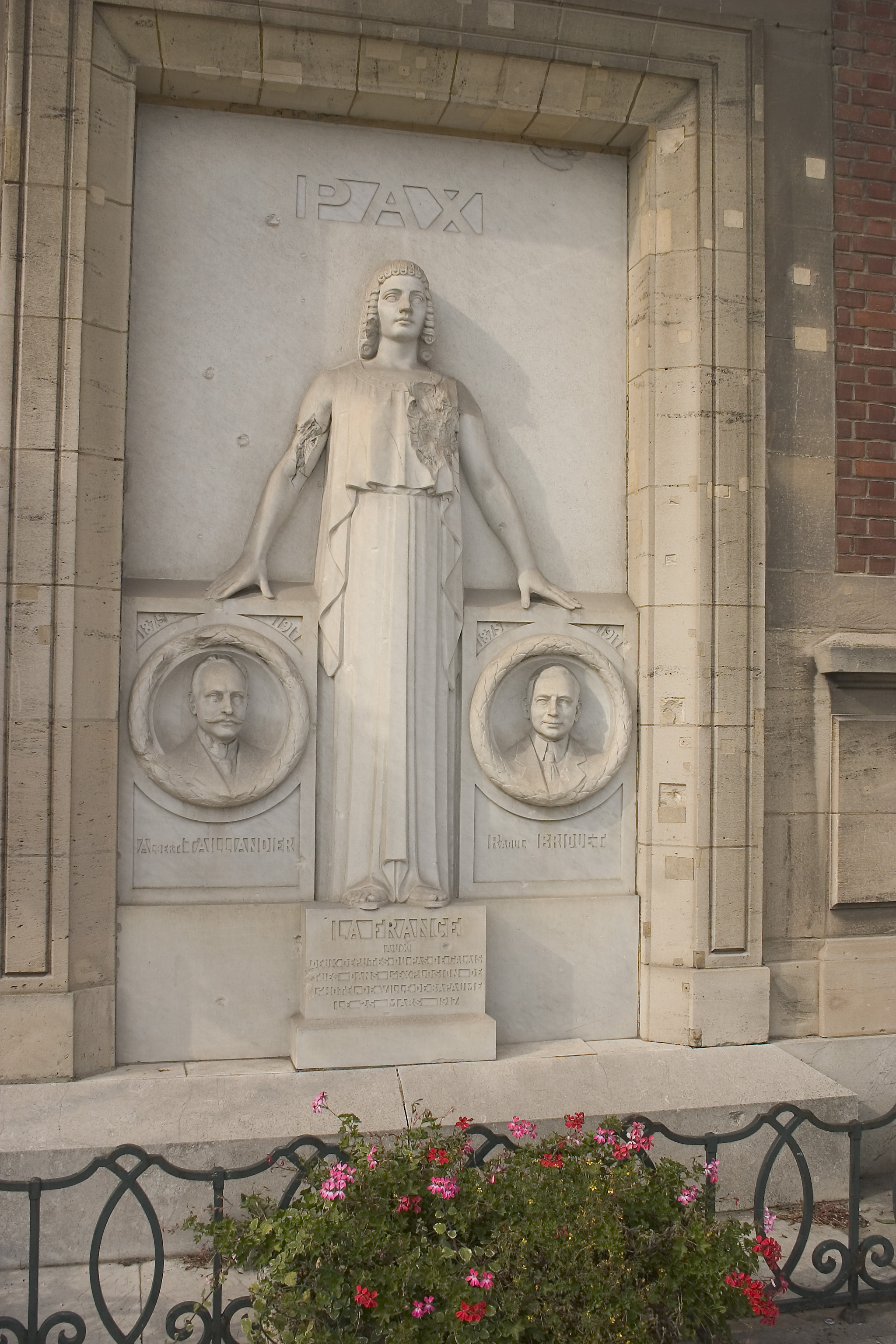
The monument to Briquet and Tallandier

A monument was erected in front of the town hall in memory of Albert Taillandier and Raoul Briquet who were killed in the explosion of the Town Hall on 25 March 1917. They were both elected representatives of Pas-de-Calais but of different parties: Taillandier was a Conservative while Briquet was a Socialist. They were on an inspection mission to the front on behalf of the National Assembly of France and wished to spend the night in the building but they were trapped and killed by the explosion. Ernst Jünger wrote in his Storm of Steel that the explosion was caused by an Improvised explosive device (IED) that had been left by retreating German troops.

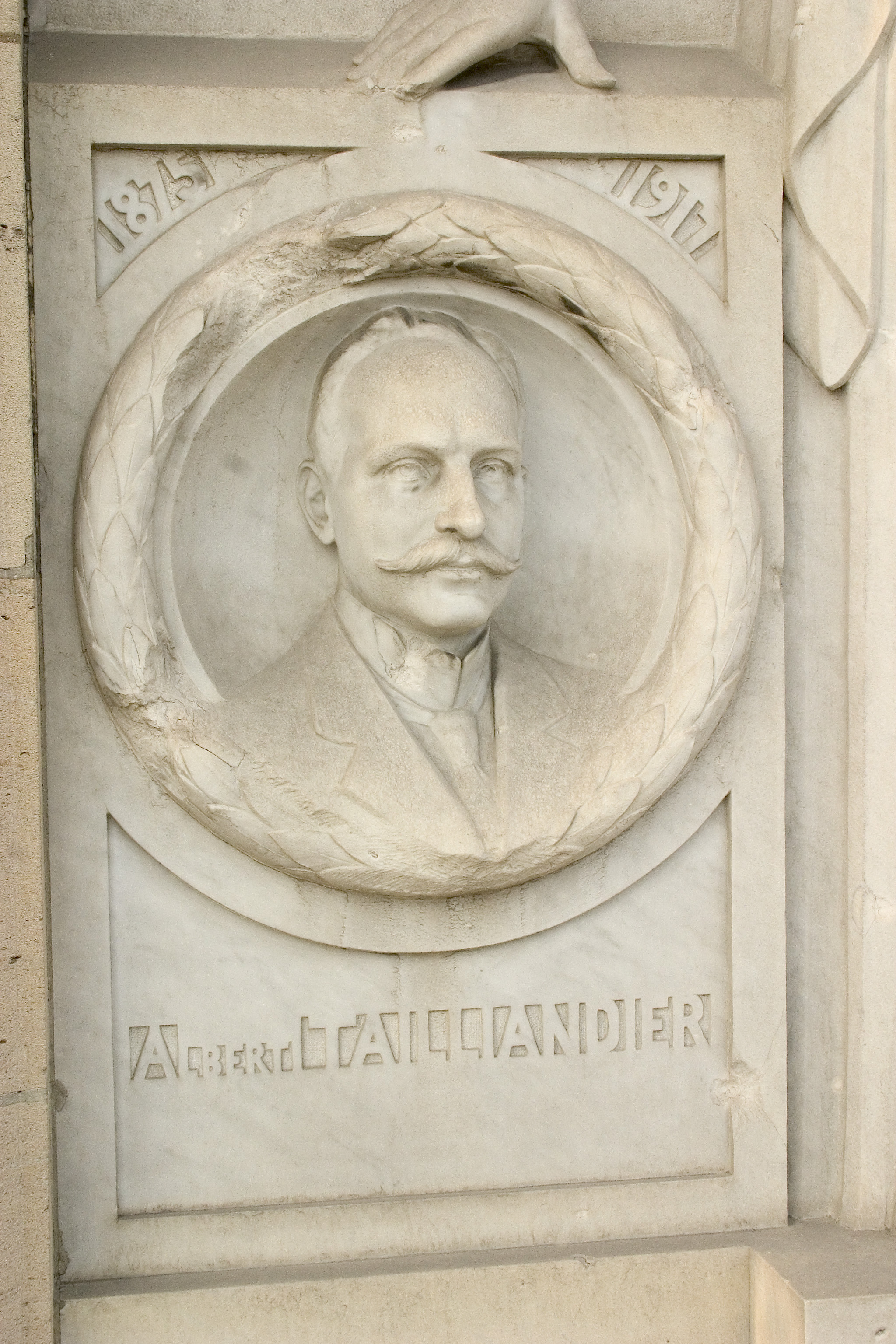
Albert Taillandier

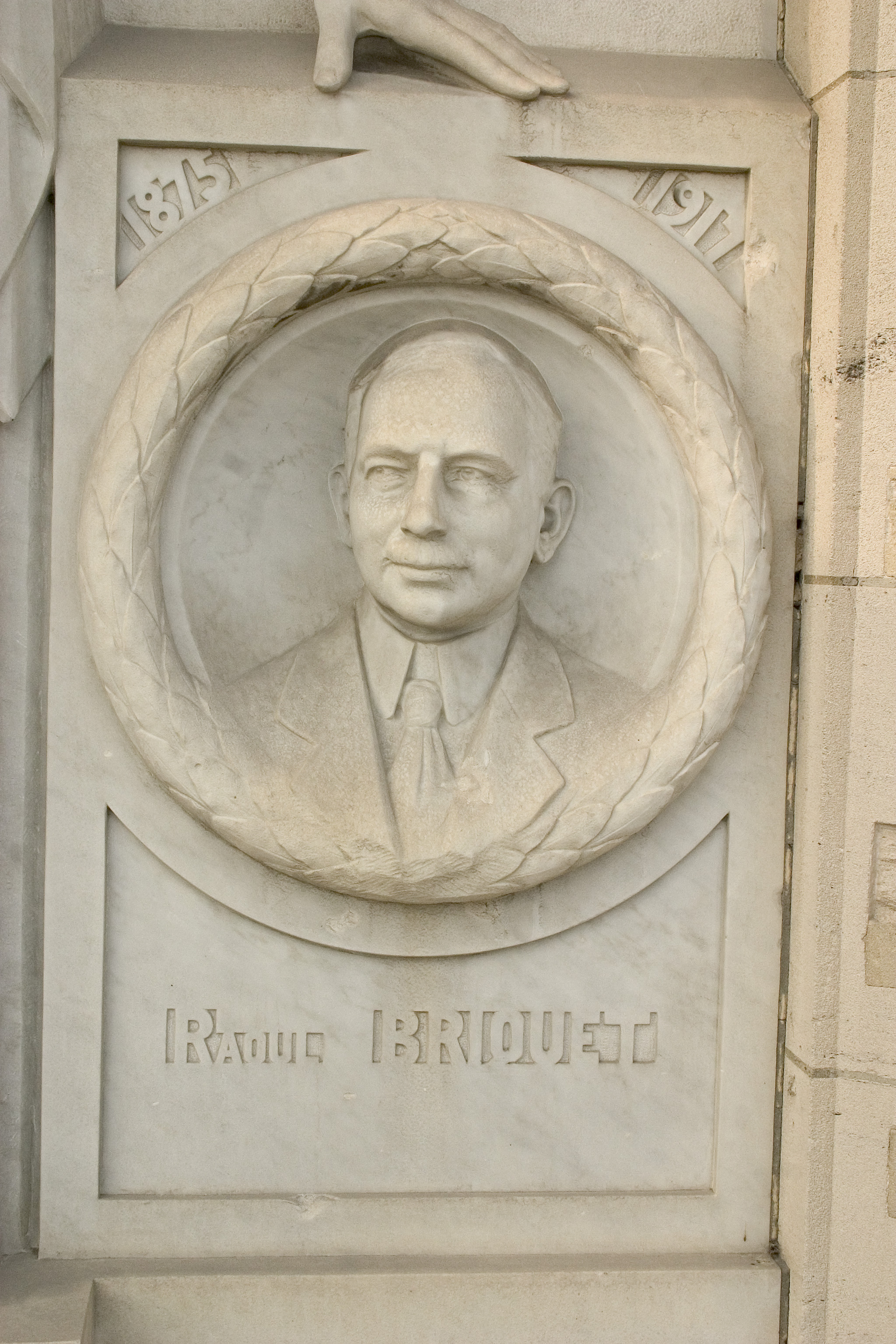
Raoul Briquet

=== The Church of Saint Nicolas ===
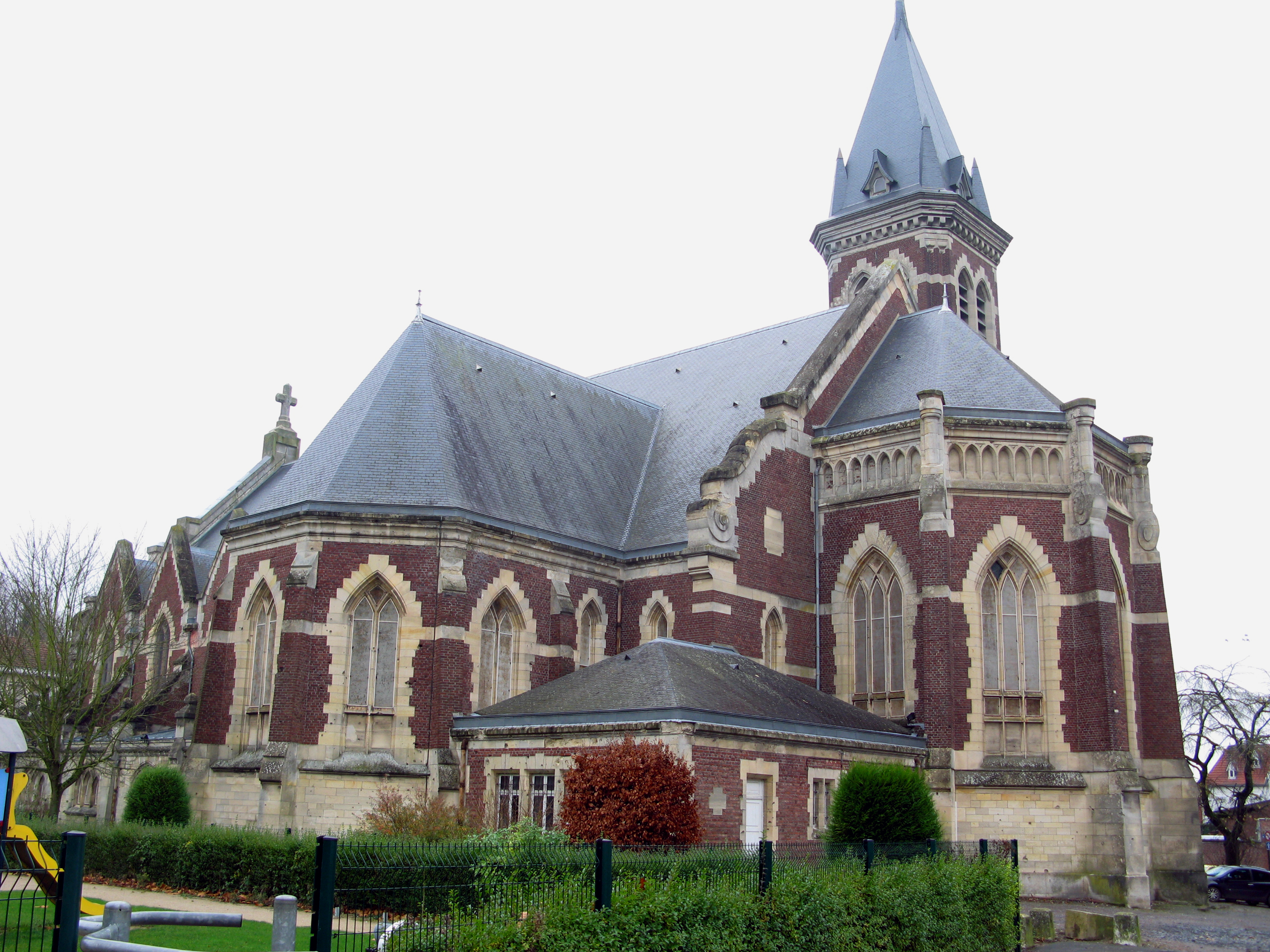
The Church of Saint Nicolas

The origin of the parish of Saint-Nicolas coincides with the origin of the town. The first church was built in 1085 when the town first became important but had disappeared by the end of the 14th century. The second church was built around the year 1600 but destroyed during the First World War. It was rebuilt on the same foundations between 1924 and 1929. The Church contains three items that are registered as historical objects:

- A Bas-relief: the Resurrection (16th century) (disappeared in 1916)
- A Statue: Virgin of Pity (16th century). This statue was the only object from the Church to survive the First World War.
- The Organ (1934)

=== The War memorial ===
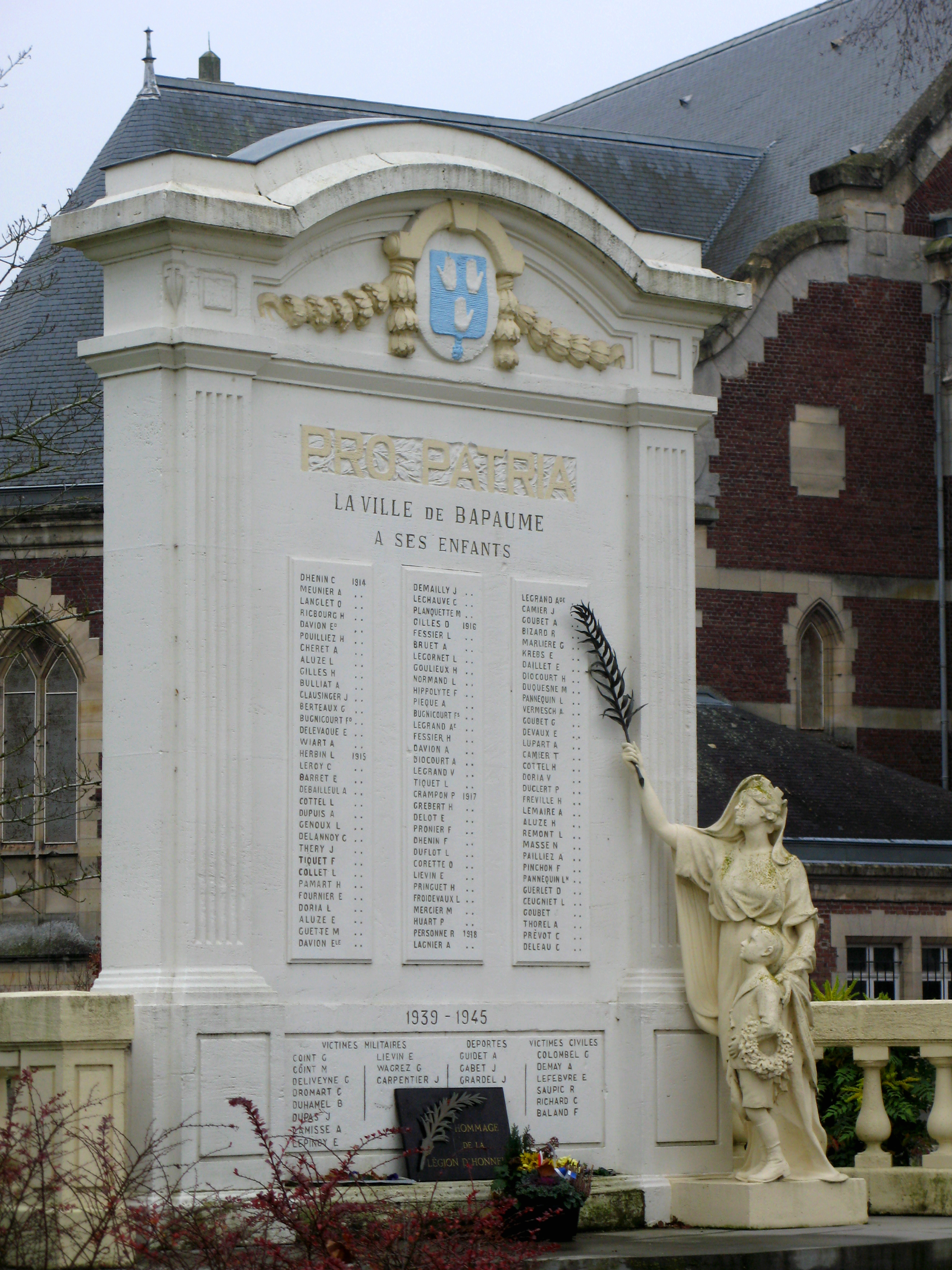
The War Memorial

This structure consists of a stone wall, topped by a pediment decorated with the coat of arms of the city, bordered on either side of a balustrade. Under the pediment above the three column list of soldiers killed in 1914–1918 are the words "Pro Patria" in large size followed by the text "La ville de Bapaume à ses enfants" (The city of Bapaume to its children). Further down on the side there is a standing woman with a child clearly symbolizing a widow and an orphan. The woman, hair partially covered with a veil which descends down her back until mid-legs, has her right arm raised to designate a name using a palm held in her hand. She has, in a sign of protection, her left hand placed on the left shoulder of the child who, in short pants, head high, and confident, holds a beret in his right hand and holding a wreath around the left forearm. The bottom section of the monument contains a list in four columns of the missing from the 1939–1945 war.

=== Other sites of interest ===
- A Motte-and-bailey castle. Nothing is left of the old castle other than sections of wall from the fortifications of the city. The site itself has retained its crater shape and was converted into a green park and place for walking. This site is nicknamed "Le Donjon" (The Dungeon) by the people of Bapaume.
- The Australian War Cemetery has an area of 459 m2 with 88 graves from the First World War. This cemetery was opened in March 1917 by the 3rd Australian Casualty Clearing Station and used until June 1917. In April and May 1918 23 German graves were added.

== Notable people linked to the commune ==
- Gaspard de Bavincourt, born in Bapaume, Knight of Saint John of Jerusalem, a monk from Anchin Abbey
- G. Prévot, born in Bapaume in 1820. Photographer of the Imperial Guard of the French Second Empire. He lived at 5 Boulevard Montmartre in Paris
- General Louis Léon César Faidherbe
- Mayor Abel Guidet
- Jean-Paul Delevoye, former mayor of Bapaume. He held the office of Médiateur de la République (Ombudsman of France) from 2004 to 2010. He was elected President of the French Economic, Social and Environmental Council (CESE) on 16 November 2010
- Jean-Jacques Cottel, Mayor of Bapaume
- Michèle Bellon, born in Bapaume in 1949, President of the Directorate of the Electricity Distribution Network of France (ERDF), the largest employer in France in 2012 (35,000 staff)
- Hugues De Beaumetz 1140–1198, Squire, Lord and Châtelain of Bapaume
- Gilles I de Beaumetz 1170–1214, Lord of Bapaume and Beaumetz-les-Loges
- Gilles II de Beaumetz 1205–1267, Châtelain of Bapaume

== See also ==
- Communes of the Pas-de-Calais department
