= Bapaume Australian Cemetery =

CWGC Cemetery in Pas-de-Calais, France

- Commonwealth War Graves Commission
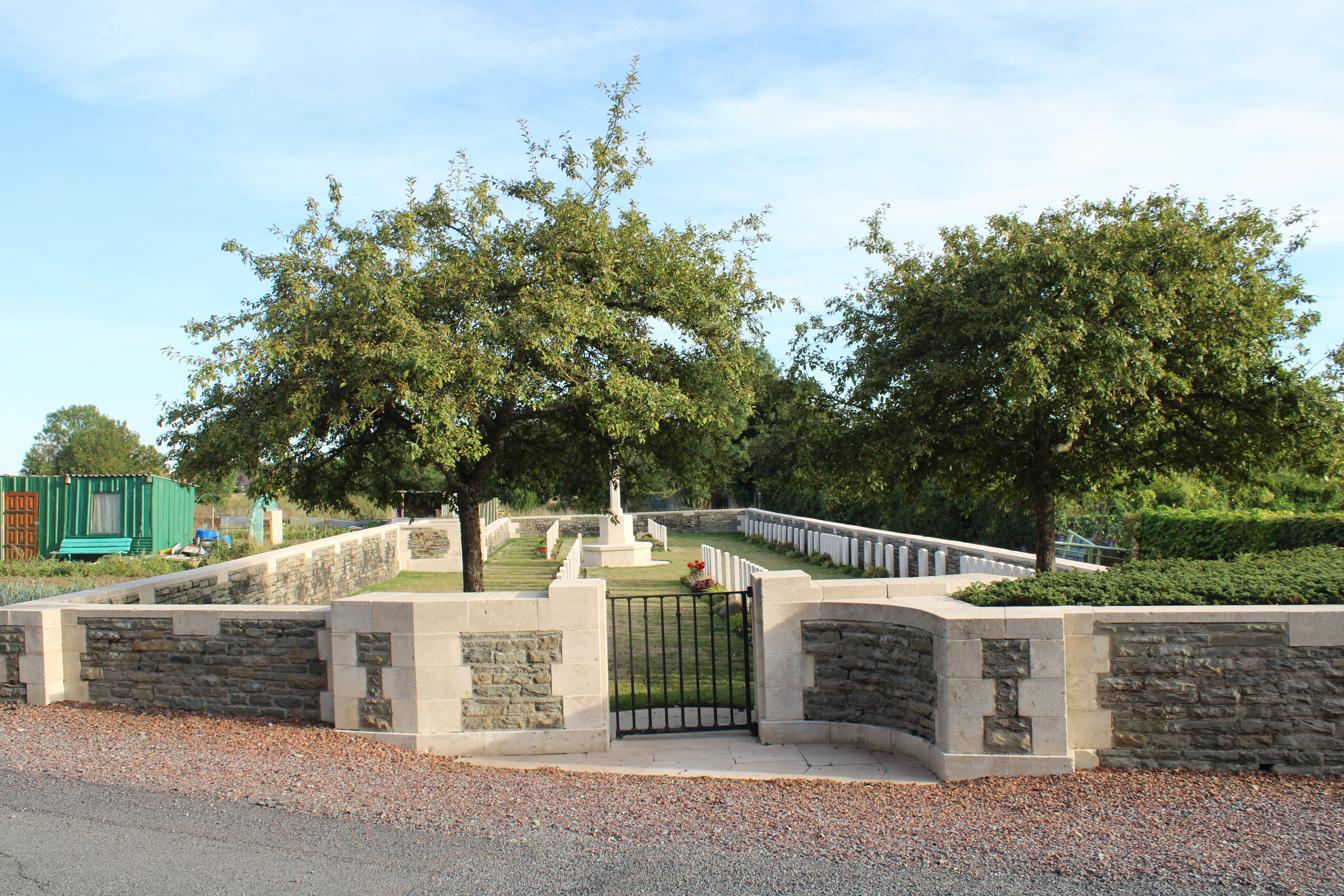
- Entrance
- Used for those deceased 1914–1918
- Established: 1917
- Location: 50°6′6″N 2°51′17″E

Burials by nation
- Allied Powers, German Empire

Burials by war
- World War I

The Bapaume Australian Cemetery (French: Cimetière australien de Bapaume) is a military cemetery located in the French commune of Bapaume (Pas-de-Calais). The site is maintained by the Commonwealth War Graves Commission.

== History ==
Bapaume was severely damaged by both sides during World War I. When the cemetery was established in 1917, the location was close to the 3rd Australian Casualty Clearing Station.

== Design ==
The rectangular site is enclosed by a rubble wall.

== Burials ==
The site includes both Commonwealth and German graves, including 87 identified casualties from World War I.
