= Canton of Brebières =

Coordinates: 50.34°N 3.02°E

The canton of Brebières is an administrative division of the Pas-de-Calais department, in northern France. It was created at the French canton reorganisation which came into effect in March 2015. Its seat is in Brebières.

It consists of the following communes:

1. Arleux-en-Gohelle
2. Bellonne
3. Biache-Saint-Vaast
4. Boiry-Notre-Dame
5. Brebières
6. Cagnicourt
7. Corbehem
8. Dury
9. Étaing
10. Éterpigny
11. Fresnes-lès-Montauban
12. Fresnoy-en-Gohelle
13. Gouy-sous-Bellonne
14. Hamblain-les-Prés
15. Haucourt
16. Hendecourt-lès-Cagnicourt
17. Izel-lès-Équerchin
18. Neuvireuil
19. Noyelles-sous-Bellonne
20. Oppy
21. Pelves
22. Plouvain
23. Quiéry-la-Motte
24. Récourt
25. Rémy
26. Riencourt-lès-Cagnicourt
27. Rœux
28. Sailly-en-Ostrevent
29. Saudemont
30. Tortequesne
31. Villers-lès-Cagnicourt
32. Vis-en-Artois
33. Vitry-en-Artois
