= Quiéry-la-Motte =

- Commune
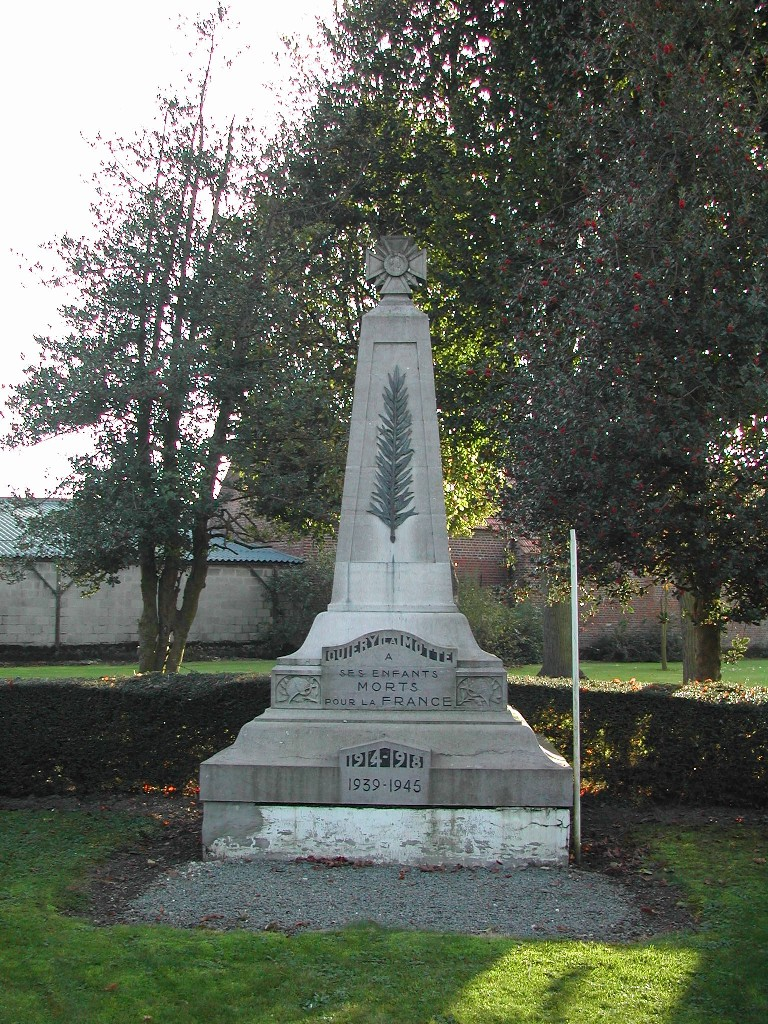
- The monument to the dead of Quiéry-la-motte

- Coat of arms
- Location of Quiéry-la-Motte
- Location within France Location within Hauts-de-France
- Coordinates: 50°21′59″N 2°58′44″E
- Country: France
- Region: Hauts-de-France
- Department: Pas-de-Calais
- Arrondissement: Arras
- Canton: Brebières
- Intercommunality: CC Osartis Marquion

Government
  - Mayor (2020–2026): Frédéric Humez
- Area^{1}: 8.93 km^{2} (3.45 sq mi)
- Elevation: 32 m (105 ft)
- Highest elevation: 64 m (210 ft)
- Lowest elevation: 26 m (85 ft)
- Population (2023): 702
  - Density: 78.6/km^{2} (204/sq mi)
- Time zone: UTC+01:00 (CET)
  - Summer (DST): UTC+02:00 (CEST)
- INSEE/Postal code: 62680 /62490
- ^{1} French Land Register data, which excludes lakes, ponds, glaciers > 1 km^{2} (0.386 sq mi or 247 acres) and river estuaries.

Quiéry-la-Motte (French pronunciation: [kjeʁi la mɔt]; Picard: Chiéry-l'Motte) is a commune in the Pas-de-Calais department in the Hauts-de-France region of France.

== Geography ==
Quiéry-la-Motte is situated 12 miles (19 km) northeast of Arras, at the junction of the D39 and D48 roads. The A1 autoroute passes right by the commune.

== Population ==
Historical population
Year	Pop.	±% p.a.
1968	568	—
1975	673	+2.45%
1982	701	+0.58%
1990	769	+1.16%
1999	775	+0.09%
2007	744	−0.51%
2012	736	−0.22%
2017	737	+0.03%
2023	702	−0.81%
Source: INSEE

== Places of interest ==
- The church of St.Martin, dating from the seventeenth century.
- A feudal motte.

== See also ==
- Communes of the Pas-de-Calais department
