= Neuvireuil =

- Commune
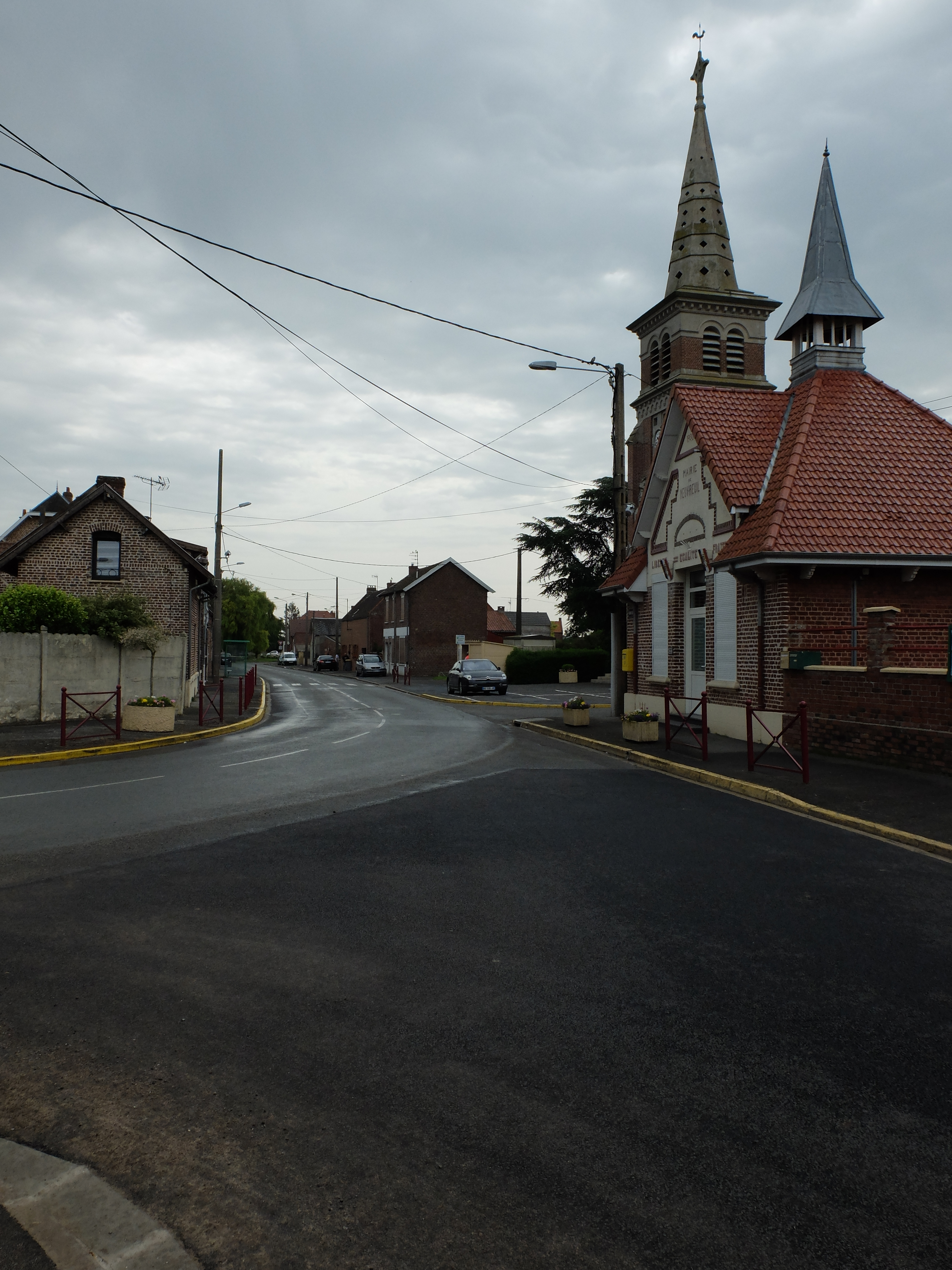
- The main road of Neuvireuil

- Coat of arms
- Location of Neuvireuil
- Location within France Location within Hauts-de-France
- Coordinates: 50°21′09″N 2°54′40″E
- Country: France
- Region: Hauts-de-France
- Department: Pas-de-Calais
- Arrondissement: Arras
- Canton: Brebières
- Intercommunality: CC Osartis Marquion

Government
  - Mayor (2020–2026): Michel Houvenaeghel
- Area^{1}: 4.34 km^{2} (1.68 sq mi)
- Elevation: 55 m (180 ft)
- Highest elevation: 61 m (200 ft)
- Lowest elevation: 40 m (130 ft)
- Population (2023): 570
  - Density: 130/km^{2} (340/sq mi)
- Time zone: UTC+01:00 (CET)
  - Summer (DST): UTC+02:00 (CEST)
- INSEE/Postal code: 62612 /62580
- ^{1} French Land Register data, which excludes lakes, ponds, glaciers > 1 km^{2} (0.386 sq mi or 247 acres) and river estuaries.

Neuvireuil (French pronunciation: [nøviʁœj]) is a commune in the Pas-de-Calais department in the Hauts-de-France region of France.

== Geography ==
Neuvireuil is situated 7 miles (11 km) northeast of Arras, at the junction of the D46 and D48 roads.

== Population ==
Historical population
Year	Pop.	±% p.a.
1968	362	—
1975	330	−1.31%
1982	424	+3.65%
1990	474	+1.40%
1999	451	−0.55%
2007	458	+0.19%
2012	495	+1.57%
2017	574	+3.01%
2023	570	−0.12%
Source: INSEE

== Places of interest ==
- The seventeenth century church of St. Amé, rebuilt after World War I.

== See also ==
- Communes of the Pas-de-Calais department
