= Riencourt-lès-Cagnicourt =

- Commune
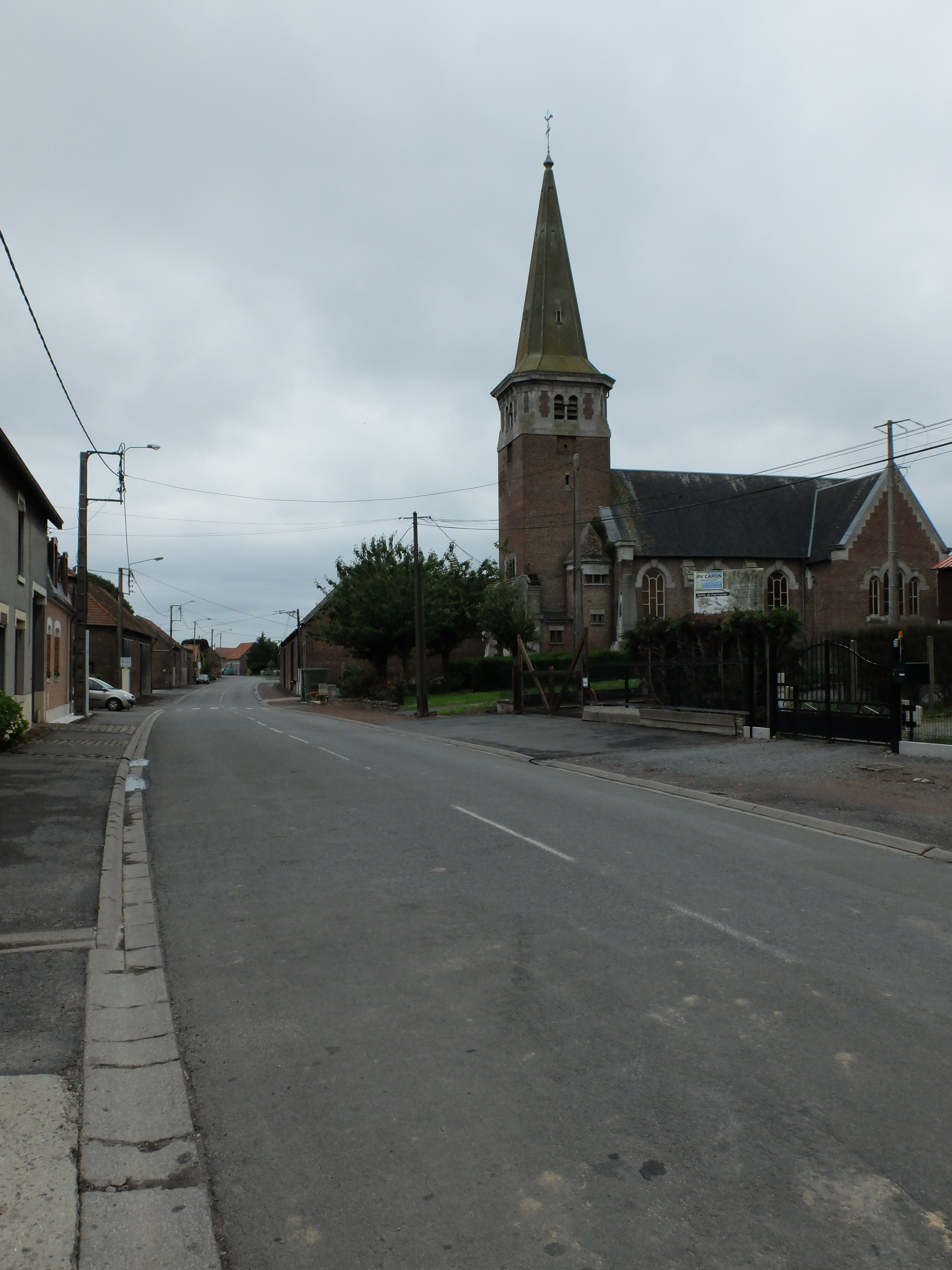
- The church of Riencourt-lès-Cagnicourt

- Coat of arms
- Location of Riencourt-lès-Cagnicourt
- Location within France Location within Hauts-de-France
- Coordinates: 50°12′00″N 2°57′31″E
- Country: France
- Region: Hauts-de-France
- Department: Pas-de-Calais
- Arrondissement: Arras
- Canton: Brebières
- Intercommunality: CC Osartis Marquion

Government
  - Mayor (2020–2026): Gérard Crutel
- Area^{1}: 4.73 km^{2} (1.83 sq mi)
- Elevation: 90 m (300 ft)
- Highest elevation: 102 m (335 ft)
- Lowest elevation: 75 m (246 ft)
- Population (2023): 253
  - Density: 53.5/km^{2} (139/sq mi)
- Time zone: UTC+01:00 (CET)
  - Summer (DST): UTC+02:00 (CEST)
- INSEE/Postal code: 62709 /62182
- ^{1} French Land Register data, which excludes lakes, ponds, glaciers > 1 km^{2} (0.386 sq mi or 247 acres) and river estuaries.

Riencourt-lès-Cagnicourt (French pronunciation: [ʁjɛ̃kuʁ lɛ kaɲikuʁ], literally Riencourt near Cagnicourt) is a commune in the Pas-de-Calais department in the Hauts-de-France region of France.

== Geography ==
Riencourt-lès-Cagnicourt lies 12 miles (19 km) southeast of Arras, at the junction of the D13 and D83 roads.

== Population ==
Historical population
Year	Pop.	±% p.a.
1968	279	—
1975	270	−0.47%
1982	267	−0.16%
1990	255	−0.57%
1999	279	+1.00%
2007	273	−0.27%
2012	279	+0.44%
2017	262	−1.25%
2023	253	−0.58%
Source: INSEE

== Places of interest ==
- The church of St.Vaast, rebuilt along with most of the village, after World War I.

== See also ==
- Communes of the Pas-de-Calais department
