= Communauté de communes Osartis Marquion =

Federation of municipalities in France

Osartis Marquion
- Communauté de communes
- Interactive map of Osartis Marquion
- Coordinates: 50°16′N 02°59′E
- Country: France
- Region: Hauts-de-France
- Department: Pas-de-Calais
- No. of communes: {{{nbcomm}}}
- Established: 2014
- Area: 330.6 km^{2} (127.6 sq mi)
- Population (2018): 42,277
  - Density: 127.9/km^{2} (331.2/sq mi)

The Communauté de communes Osartis Marquion is a communauté de communes, an intercommunal structure, in the Pas-de-Calais department, in the Hauts-de-France region, northern France. It was created in January 2014 by the merger of the former communautés de communes Osartis and Marquion. Its area is 330.6 km^{2}, and its population was 42,277 in 2018. Its seat is in Vitry-en-Artois.

== Composition ==
The communauté de communes consists of the following 49 communes:

1. Arleux-en-Gohelle
2. Baralle
3. Bellonne
4. Biache-Saint-Vaast
5. Boiry-Notre-Dame
6. Bourlon
7. Brebières
8. Buissy
9. Cagnicourt
10. Corbehem
11. Dury
12. Écourt-Saint-Quentin
13. Épinoy
14. Étaing
15. Éterpigny
16. Fresnes-lès-Montauban
17. Fresnoy-en-Gohelle
18. Gouy-sous-Bellonne
19. Graincourt-lès-Havrincourt
20. Hamblain-les-Prés
21. Haucourt
22. Hendecourt-lès-Cagnicourt
23. Inchy-en-Artois
24. Izel-lès-Équerchin
25. Lagnicourt-Marcel
26. Marquion
27. Neuvireuil
28. Noyelles-sous-Bellonne
29. Oisy-le-Verger
30. Oppy
31. Palluel
32. Pelves
33. Plouvain
34. Pronville-en-Artois
35. Quéant
36. Quiéry-la-Motte
37. Récourt
38. Rémy
39. Riencourt-lès-Cagnicourt
40. Rumaucourt
41. Sailly-en-Ostrevent
42. Sains-lès-Marquion
43. Sauchy-Cauchy
44. Sauchy-Lestrée
45. Saudemont
46. Tortequesne
47. Villers-lès-Cagnicourt
48. Vis-en-Artois
49. Vitry-en-Artois
