= Noyelles-sous-Bellonne =

- Commune
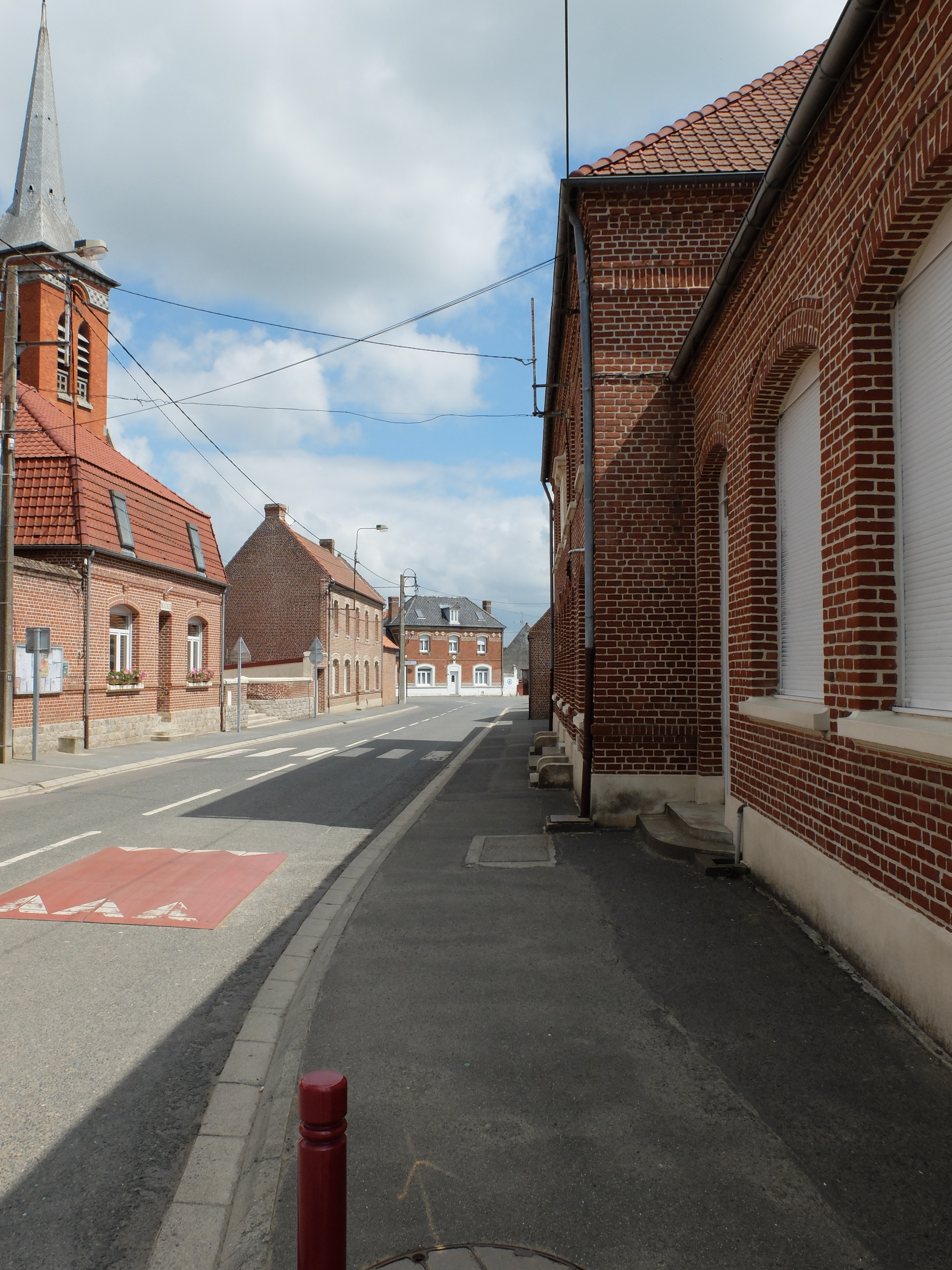
- A road in Noyelles-sous-Bellonne

- Coat of arms
- Location of Noyelles-sous-Bellonne
- Location within France Location within Hauts-de-France
- Coordinates: 50°18′31″N 3°01′41″E
- Country: France
- Region: Hauts-de-France
- Department: Pas-de-Calais
- Arrondissement: Arras
- Canton: Brebières
- Intercommunality: CC Osartis Marquion

Government
  - Mayor (2020–2026): Patrick Doyen
- Area^{1}: 4.21 km^{2} (1.63 sq mi)
- Elevation: 40 m (130 ft)
- Highest elevation: 71 m (233 ft)
- Lowest elevation: 31 m (102 ft)
- Population (2023): 848
  - Density: 201/km^{2} (522/sq mi)
- Time zone: UTC+01:00 (CET)
  - Summer (DST): UTC+02:00 (CEST)
- INSEE/Postal code: 62627 /62490
- ^{1} French Land Register data, which excludes lakes, ponds, glaciers > 1 km^{2} (0.386 sq mi or 247 acres) and river estuaries.

Noyelles-sous-Bellonne (French pronunciation: [nwajɛl su bɛlɔn], literally Noyelles under Bellonne) is a commune in the Pas-de-Calais department in the Hauts-de-France region of France.

== Geography ==
Noyelles-sous-Bellonne is situated 14 miles (23 km) east of Arras, at the junction of the D44 and D44E roads.

== Population ==
Historical population
Year	Pop.	±% p.a.
1968	391	—
1975	383	−0.29%
1982	379	−0.15%
1990	515	+3.91%
1999	568	+1.09%
2007	718	+2.97%
2012	829	+2.92%
2017	812	−0.41%
2023	848	+0.73%
Source: INSEE

== Places of interest ==
- The church of St.Pétronille, rebuilt along with the rest of the village, after World War I.

== See also ==
- Communes of the Pas-de-Calais department
