= Gouy-sous-Bellonne =

- Commune
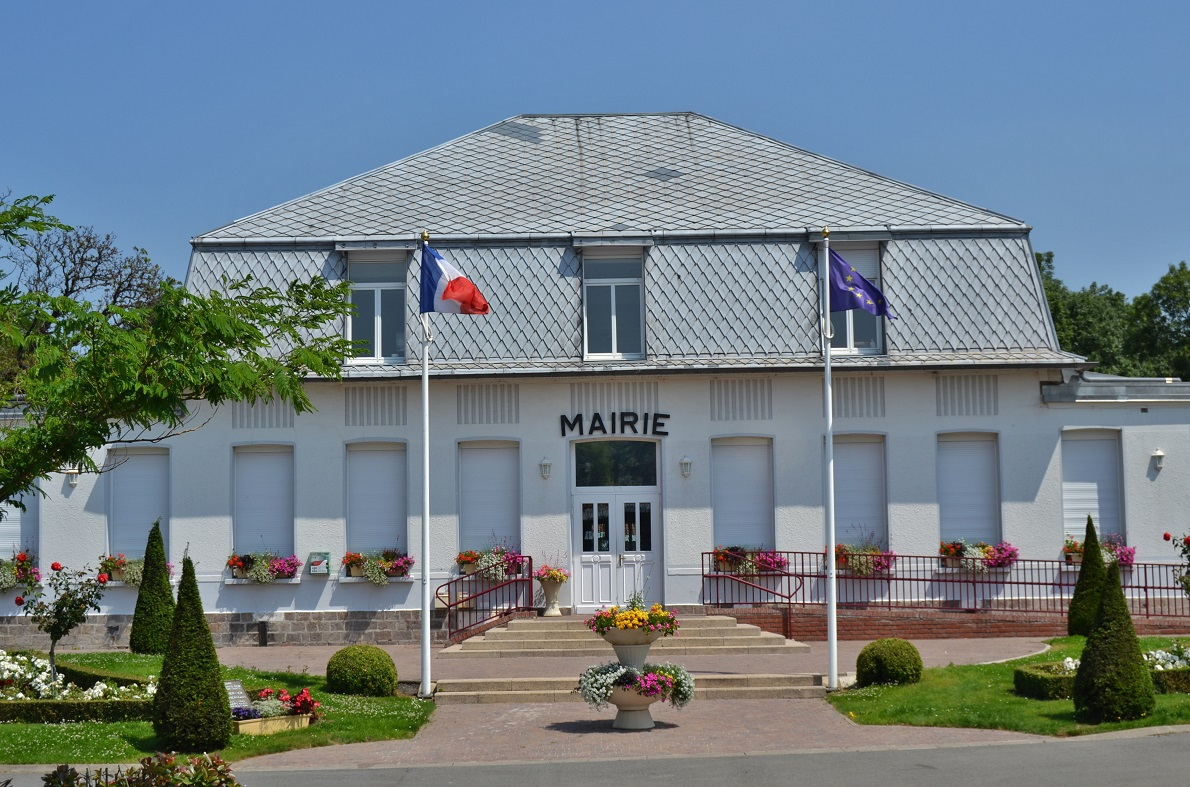
- The town hall of Gouy-sous-Bellonne

- Coat of arms
- Location of Gouy-sous-Bellonne
- Location within France Location within Hauts-de-France
- Coordinates: 50°18′43″N 3°03′24″E
- Country: France
- Region: Hauts-de-France
- Department: Pas-de-Calais
- Arrondissement: Arras
- Canton: Brebières
- Intercommunality: CC Osartis Marquion

Government
  - Mayor (2020–2026): Jean-Marie Hermant
- Area^{1}: 5.47 km^{2} (2.11 sq mi)
- Elevation: 54 m (177 ft)
- Highest elevation: 61 m (200 ft)
- Lowest elevation: 29 m (95 ft)
- Population (2023): 1,391
  - Density: 254/km^{2} (659/sq mi)
- Time zone: UTC+01:00 (CET)
  - Summer (DST): UTC+02:00 (CEST)
- INSEE/Postal code: 62383 /62112
- ^{1} French Land Register data, which excludes lakes, ponds, glaciers > 1 km^{2} (0.386 sq mi or 247 acres) and river estuaries.

Gouy-sous-Bellonne (French pronunciation: [ɡwi su bɛlɔn], literally Gouy under Bellonne) is a commune in the Pas-de-Calais department in the Hauts-de-France region of France.

== Geography ==
A farming village situated 15 miles (24 km) east of Arras, at the junction of the D956 and D45 roads.

== Population ==
Historical population
Year	Pop.	±% p.a.
1968	692	—
1975	873	+3.37%
1982	1,208	+4.75%
1990	1,321	+1.12%
1999	1,258	−0.54%
2007	1,217	−0.41%
2012	1,301	+1.34%
2017	1,368	+1.01%
2023	1,391	+0.28%
Source: INSEE

== Places of interest ==
- The church of St. Georges, rebuilt along with the rest of the village after World War I.

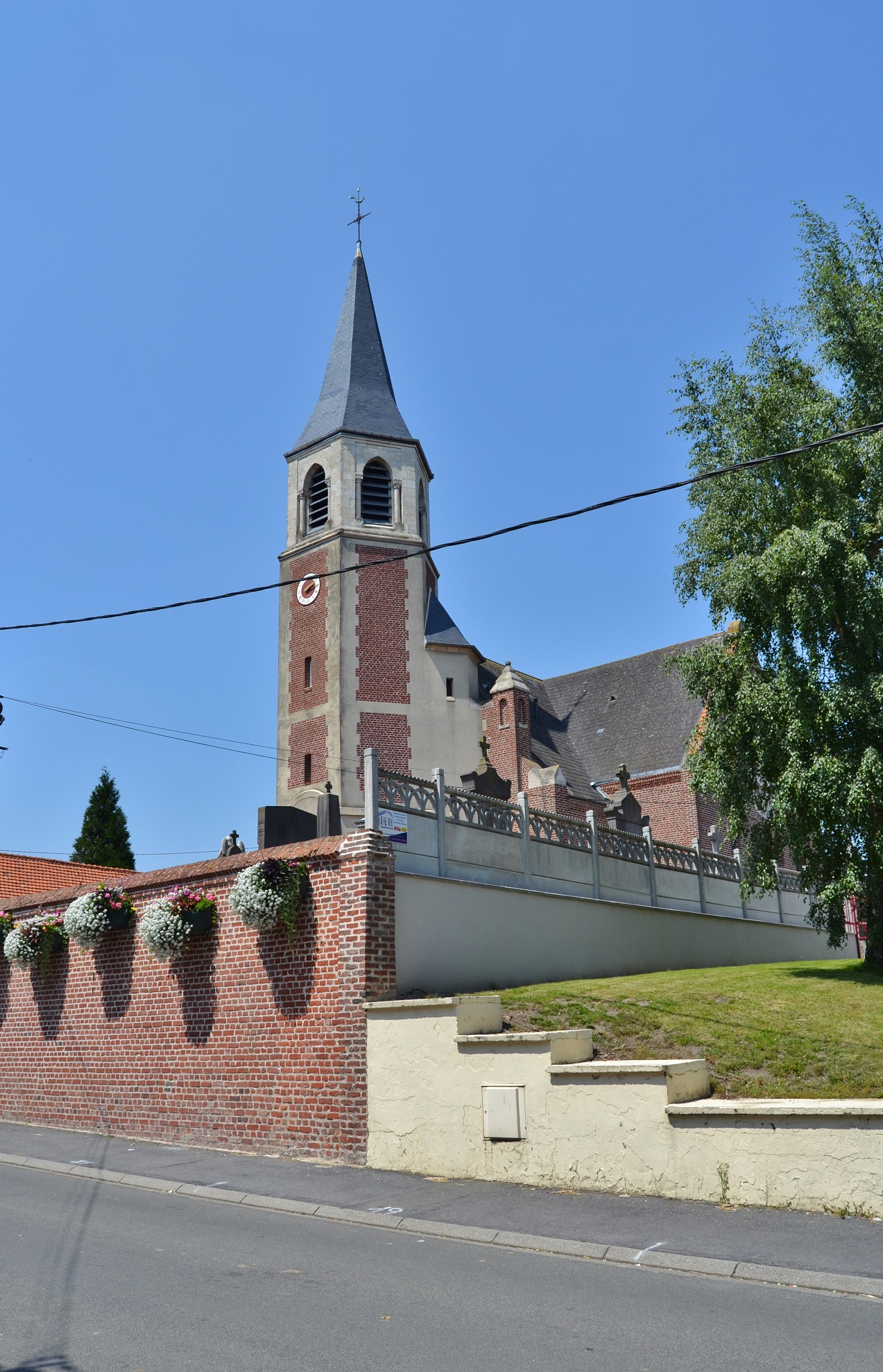
015 Gouy-sous-Bellonne ( 62112 )

== See also ==
- Communes of the Pas-de-Calais department
