= Hendecourt-lès-Cagnicourt =

- Commune
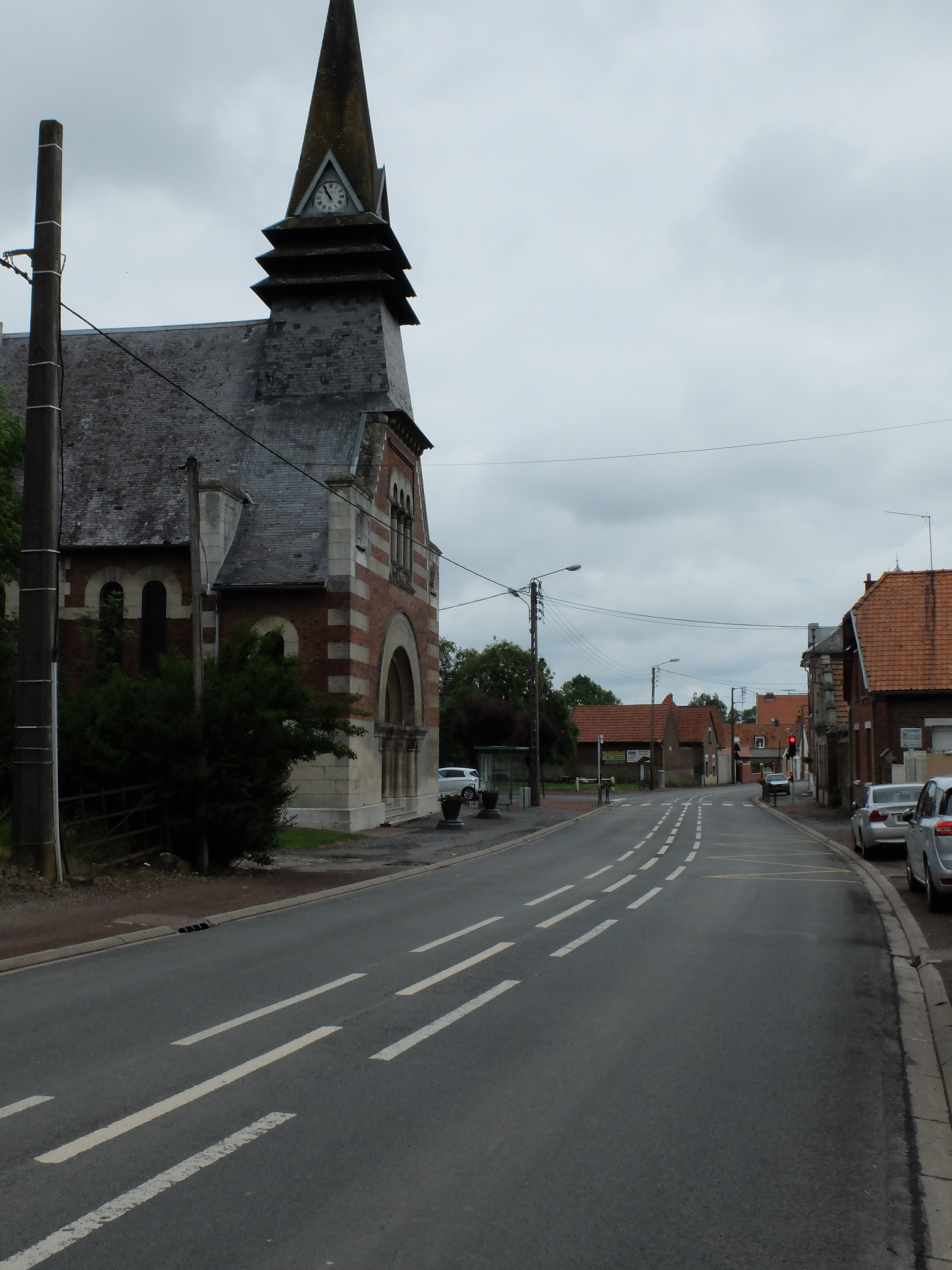
- The main road of Hendecourt-lès-Cagnicourt

- Coat of arms
- Location of Hendecourt-lès-Cagnicourt
- Location within France Location within Hauts-de-France
- Coordinates: 50°12′38″N 2°56′57″E
- Country: France
- Region: Hauts-de-France
- Department: Pas-de-Calais
- Arrondissement: Arras
- Canton: Brebières
- Intercommunality: CC Osartis Marquion

Government
  - Mayor (2020–2026): Denis Sénéchal
- Area^{1}: 8.86 km^{2} (3.42 sq mi)
- Elevation: 72 m (236 ft)
- Highest elevation: 92 m (302 ft)
- Lowest elevation: 61 m (200 ft)
- Population (2023): 288
  - Density: 32.5/km^{2} (84.2/sq mi)
- Time zone: UTC+01:00 (CET)
  - Summer (DST): UTC+02:00 (CEST)
- INSEE/Postal code: 62424 /62182
- ^{1} French Land Register data, which excludes lakes, ponds, glaciers > 1 km^{2} (0.386 sq mi or 247 acres) and river estuaries.

Hendecourt-lès-Cagnicourt (French pronunciation: [ɑ̃dkuʁ lɛ kaɲikuʁ], literally Hendecourt near Cagnicourt; Picard: Inn’court-lès-Cagnicourt) is a commune in the Pas-de-Calais department in the Hauts-de-France region of France.

== Geography ==
Hendecourt-lès-Cagnicourt is situated 11 miles (18 km) southeast of Arras, at the junction of the D38 and the D956 roads.

== Population ==
Historical population
Year	Pop.	±% p.a.
1968	328	—
1975	321	−0.31%
1982	310	−0.50%
1990	292	−0.74%
1999	286	−0.23%
2007	321	+1.45%
2012	319	−0.12%
2017	312	−0.44%
2023	288	−1.33%
Source: INSEE

== Places of interest ==
- The church of St. Leger, rebuilt along with the rest of the village, after World War I.
- The Commonwealth War Graves Commission cemeteries.

== See also ==
- Communes of the Pas-de-Calais department
