= Fresnoy-en-Gohelle =

- Commune
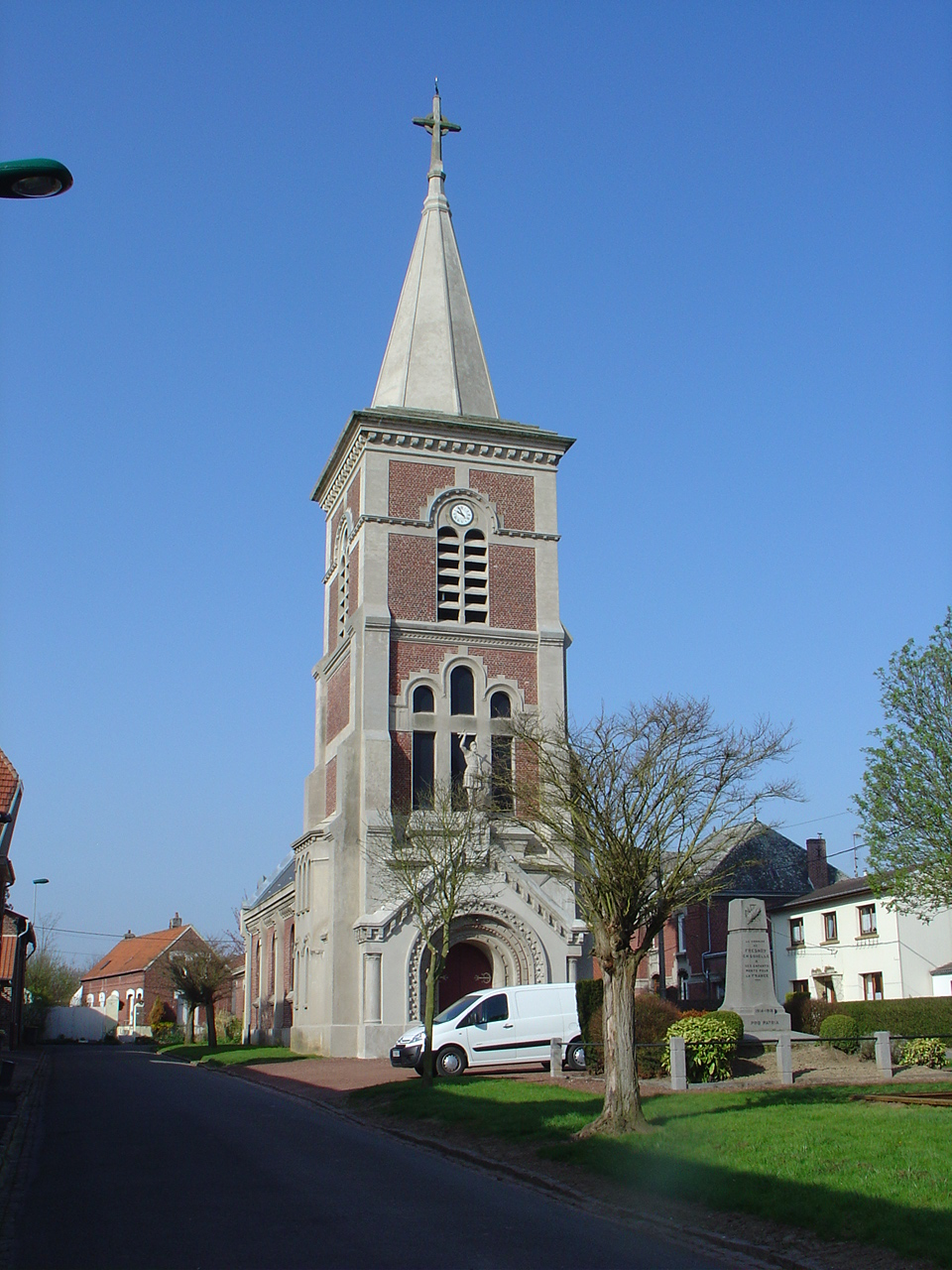
- The church of Fresnoy-en-Gohelle

- Coat of arms
- Location of Fresnoy-en-Gohelle
- Location within France Location within Hauts-de-France
- Coordinates: 50°21′59″N 2°53′27″E
- Country: France
- Region: Hauts-de-France
- Department: Pas-de-Calais
- Arrondissement: Arras
- Canton: Brebières
- Intercommunality: CC Osartis Marquion

Government
  - Mayor (2020–2026): Michel Volanti
- Area^{1}: 2.98 km^{2} (1.15 sq mi)
- Elevation: 60 m (200 ft)
- Highest elevation: 70 m (230 ft)
- Lowest elevation: 42 m (138 ft)
- Population (2023): 233
  - Density: 78.2/km^{2} (203/sq mi)
- Time zone: UTC+01:00 (CET)
  - Summer (DST): UTC+02:00 (CEST)
- INSEE/Postal code: 62358 /62580
- ^{1} French Land Register data, which excludes lakes, ponds, glaciers > 1 km^{2} (0.386 sq mi or 247 acres) and river estuaries.

Fresnoy-en-Gohelle (French pronunciation: [fʁɛnwa ɑ̃ ɡɔɛl], lit. 'Fresnoy in Gohelle') is a commune in the Pas-de-Calais department in the Hauts-de-France region of France.

== Geography ==
A small farming village situated 9 miles (14 km) northeast of Arras, at the junction of the D919 and the D33 roads.

== Population ==
Historical population
Year	Pop.	±% p.a.
1968	127	—
1975	120	−0.81%
1982	140	+2.23%
1990	206	+4.95%
1999	199	−0.38%
2007	249	+2.84%
2012	246	−0.24%
2017	214	−2.75%
2023	233	+1.43%
Source: INSEE

== Places of interest ==
- The church of St. Armand, rebuilt as was the rest of the village, after World War I.

== World War I ==
Fresnoy was virtually destroyed in 1917 during the First World War.

After their successes in the spring campaigns (including the taking of Vimy Ridge), the Canadians and British pushed eastwards across open country until they reached German defence lines that, in this sector, ran north to south from Arleux, on to Oppy and then down to Gavrelle.

Following a successful push by the Canadians through Arelux in late April, German positions in and around Fresnoy became the scene of fierce fighting on April 28, 1917. The German lieutenant Ernst Jünger recalled the barrage on the village:

In Fresnoy the shells were sending up the earth in fountains as high as church towers. Each seemed bent on outdoing its predecessor. As though by magic, one house after another was sucked into the earth. Walls collapsed, gables fell, and bare rafters were flung through the air to mow the roofs of neighbouring houses. Clouds of splinters danced above whitish swathes of vapour. Eye and ear hung as though entranced upon this dance of destruction.

A few weeks later, on May 5, the Canadians managed to capture the village. It was lost, however, when ferocious German counterattacks were launched on May 7 and pushed the Canadians and British back. The frontline then stabilised just outside the village.

In commemoration of this battle, Fresnoy Mountain in the Canadian Rockies was given its name in 1919.

== See also ==
- Communes of the Pas-de-Calais department

== Sources ==
- Bilton, D, Oppy Wood, Pen and Sword Military, 2005
- Nichols, J, Cheerful Sacrifice: The Battle of Arras 1917, Pen and Sword Military, 2003
- Jünger, Ernst (1929). Storm of Steel. Translated by Creighton, Basil.
