= Izel-lès-Équerchin =

Administrative division in Hauts-de-France, France

- Commune
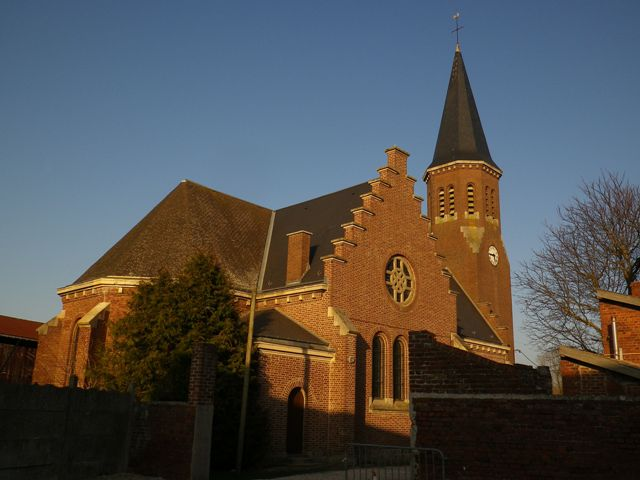
- The church of Izel-lès-Équerchin

- Coat of arms
- Location of Izel-lès-Équerchin
- Location within France Location within Hauts-de-France
- Coordinates: 50°21′44″N 2°57′03″E
- Country: France
- Region: Hauts-de-France
- Department: Pas-de-Calais
- Arrondissement: Arras
- Canton: Brebières
- Intercommunality: CC Osartis Marquion

Government
  - Mayor (2020–2026): Corinne Dubois
- Area^{1}: 9.91 km^{2} (3.83 sq mi)
- Elevation: 48 m (157 ft)
- Highest elevation: 69 m (226 ft)
- Lowest elevation: 31 m (102 ft)
- Population (2023): 1,040
  - Density: 105/km^{2} (272/sq mi)
- Time zone: UTC+01:00 (CET)
  - Summer (DST): UTC+02:00 (CEST)
- INSEE/Postal code: 62476 /62490
- ^{1} French Land Register data, which excludes lakes, ponds, glaciers > 1 km^{2} (0.386 sq mi or 247 acres) and river estuaries.

Izel-lès-Équerchin (French pronunciation: [izɛl lɛz‿ekɛʁʃɛ̃], literally Izel near Équerchin; Picard: Izé-lès-Équerchin) is a commune in the Pas-de-Calais department in the Hauts-de-France region of France.

== Geography ==
A farming village situated 11 miles (18 km) northeast of Arras, at the junction of the D40 and the D48 roads. The A1 autoroute passes by only yards away.

== Hydrography ==
The source of the Escrébieux, a 11,7 km unsailable river is in the village territory

== Population ==
Historical population
Year	Pop.	±% p.a.
1968	800	—
1975	835	+0.61%
1982	795	−0.70%
1990	817	+0.34%
1999	779	−0.53%
2007	896	+1.76%
2012	930	+0.75%
2017	1,011	+1.68%
2023	1,040	+0.47%
Source: INSEE

== Places of interest ==
- The church of St.Martin, rebuilt along with the rest of the village after World War I.

== See also ==
- Communes of the Pas-de-Calais department
