= Oppy, Pas-de-Calais =

Oppy
- Commune
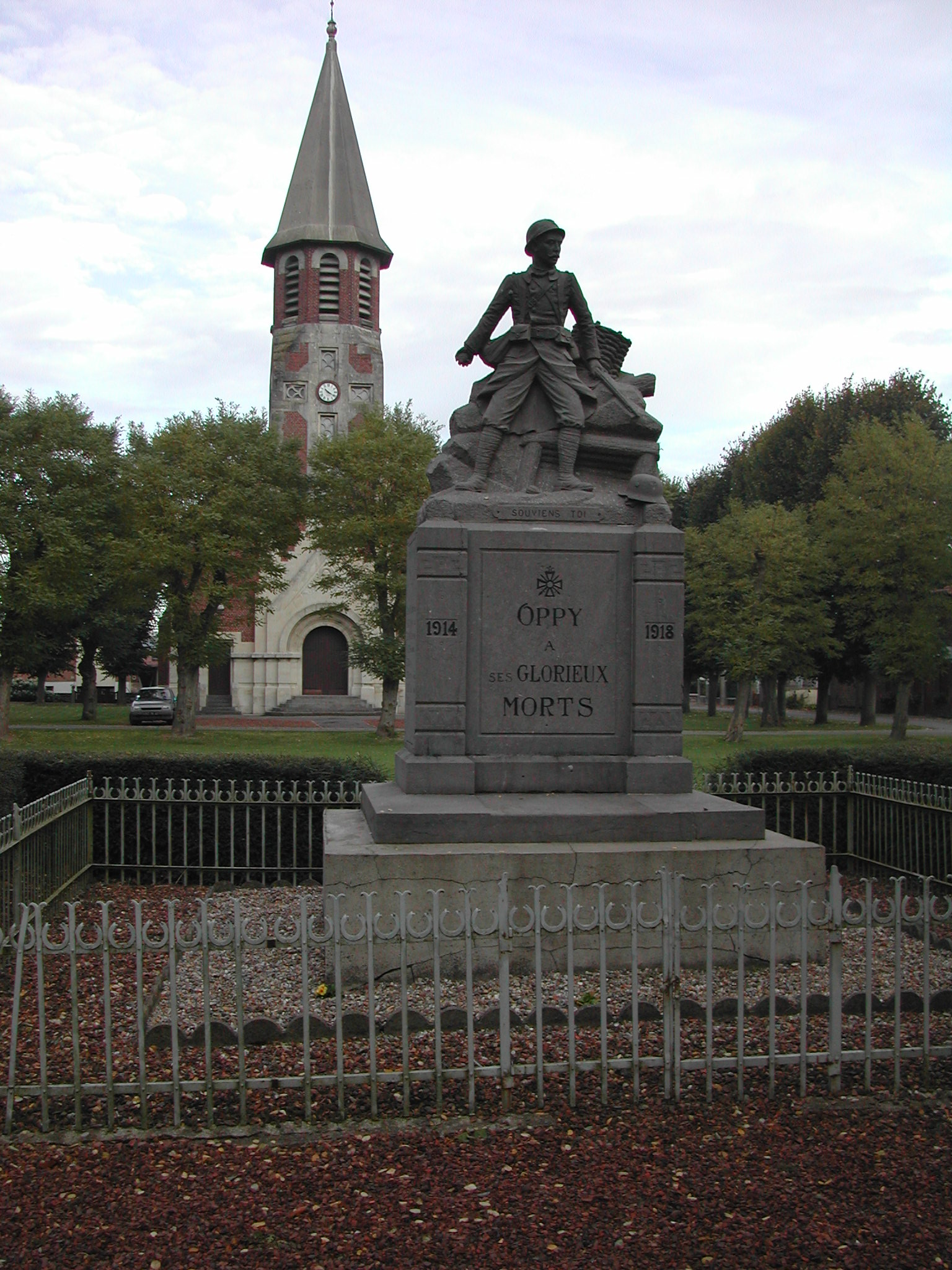
- The monument to the dead of Oppy

- Coat of arms
- Location of Oppy
- Location within France Location within Hauts-de-France
- Coordinates: 50°20′54″N 2°53′30″E
- Country: France
- Region: Hauts-de-France
- Department: Pas-de-Calais
- Arrondissement: Arras
- Canton: Brebières
- Intercommunality: CC Osartis Marquion

Government
  - Mayor (2020–2026): Xavier Platel
- Area^{1}: 4.84 km^{2} (1.87 sq mi)
- Elevation: 59 m (194 ft)
- Highest elevation: 72 m (236 ft)
- Lowest elevation: 49 m (161 ft)
- Population (2023): 418
  - Density: 86.4/km^{2} (224/sq mi)
- Time zone: UTC+01:00 (CET)
  - Summer (DST): UTC+02:00 (CEST)
- INSEE/Postal code: 62639 /62580
- ^{1} French Land Register data, which excludes lakes, ponds, glaciers > 1 km^{2} (0.386 sq mi or 247 acres) and river estuaries.

Oppy (French pronunciation: [ɔpi]) is a commune in the Pas-de-Calais department in the Hauts-de-France region of France about 7 miles (11 km) northeast of Arras.

== Population ==
Historical population
Year	Pop.	±% p.a.
1968	278	—
1975	292	+0.70%
1982	282	−0.50%
1990	329	+1.95%
1999	375	+1.46%
2007	383	+0.26%
2012	373	−0.53%
2017	399	+1.36%
2023	418	+0.78%
Source: INSEE

== See also ==
- Capture of Oppy Wood
- Communes of the Pas-de-Calais department
