= Saudemont =

- Commune
- The church of Saudemont

- Coat of arms
- Location of Saudemont
- Location within France Location within Hauts-de-France
- Coordinates: 50°14′41″N 3°02′27″E
- Country: France
- Region: Hauts-de-France
- Department: Pas-de-Calais
- Arrondissement: Arras
- Canton: Brebières
- Intercommunality: CC Osartis Marquion

Government
  - Mayor (2020–2026): Laurent Turpin
- Area^{1}: 5.55 km^{2} (2.14 sq mi)
- Elevation: 48 m (157 ft)
- Highest elevation: 75 m (246 ft)
- Lowest elevation: 39 m (128 ft)
- Population (2023): 409
  - Density: 73.7/km^{2} (191/sq mi)
- Time zone: UTC+01:00 (CET)
  - Summer (DST): UTC+02:00 (CEST)
- INSEE/Postal code: 62782 /62860
- ^{1} French Land Register data, which excludes lakes, ponds, glaciers > 1 km^{2} (0.386 sq mi or 247 acres) and river estuaries.

Saudemont (French pronunciation: [sodmɔ̃]) is a commune in the Pas-de-Calais department in the Hauts-de-France region of France 14 miles (23 km) southeast of Arras.

== Population ==
Historical population
Year	Pop.	±% p.a.
1968	315	—
1975	300	−0.69%
1982	374	+3.20%
1990	382	+0.26%
1999	375	−0.21%
2007	432	+1.78%
2012	452	+0.91%
2017	449	−0.13%
2023	409	−1.54%
Source: INSEE

== See also ==
- Communes of the Pas-de-Calais department
