= Hamblain-les-Prés =

- Commune
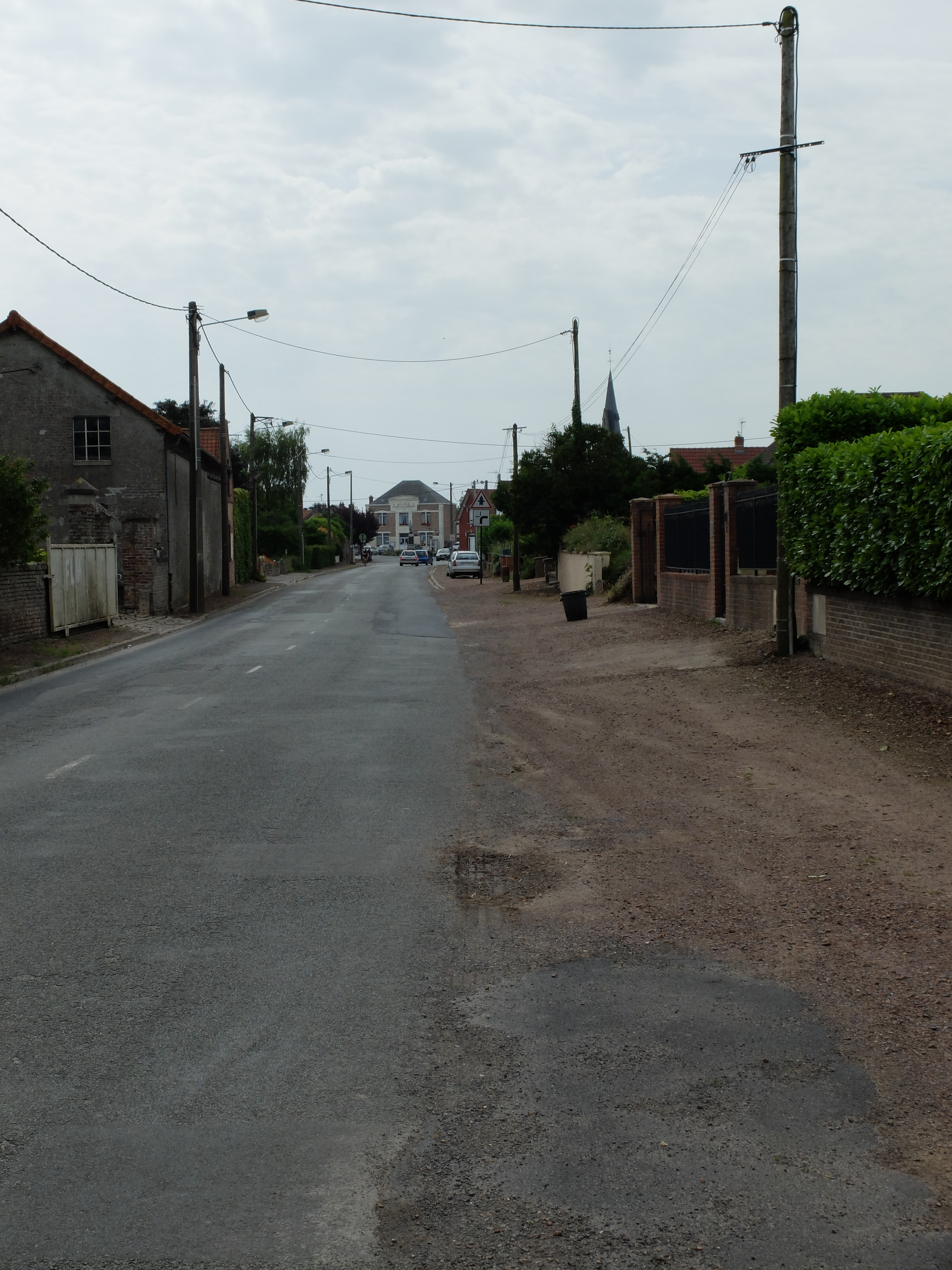
- A road in Hamblain-les-Prés

- Coat of arms
- Location of Hamblain-les-Prés
- Location within France Location within Hauts-de-France
- Coordinates: 50°17′38″N 2°57′41″E
- Country: France
- Region: Hauts-de-France
- Department: Pas-de-Calais
- Arrondissement: Arras
- Canton: Brebières
- Intercommunality: CC Osartis Marquion

Government
  - Mayor (2020–2026): Patrick Deregnaucourt
- Area^{1}: 4.87 km^{2} (1.88 sq mi)
- Elevation: 44 m (144 ft)
- Highest elevation: 73 m (240 ft)
- Lowest elevation: 41 m (135 ft)
- Population (2023): 454
  - Density: 93.2/km^{2} (241/sq mi)
- Time zone: UTC+01:00 (CET)
  - Summer (DST): UTC+02:00 (CEST)
- INSEE/Postal code: 62405 /62118
- ^{1} French Land Register data, which excludes lakes, ponds, glaciers > 1 km^{2} (0.386 sq mi or 247 acres) and river estuaries.

Hamblain-les-Prés (French pronunciation: [ɑ̃blɛ̃ le pʁe]) is a commune in the Pas-de-Calais department in the Hauts-de-France region of France.

== Geography ==
A farming village situated 8 miles (13 km) east of Arras, at the junction of the D34 and the D43 roads.
The A26 autoroute passes by the village about half a mile away.

== Population ==
Historical population
Year	Pop.	±% p.a.
1968	325	—
1975	343	+0.77%
1982	398	+2.15%
1990	516	+3.30%
1999	483	−0.73%
2007	481	−0.05%
2012	493	+0.49%
2017	504	+0.44%
2023	454	−1.73%
Source: INSEE

== Places of interest ==
- The church of St.Michel, rebuilt along with the entire village, after World War I.

== See also ==
- Communes of the Pas-de-Calais department
