= Corbehem =

Corbehem Corbeham
- Commune
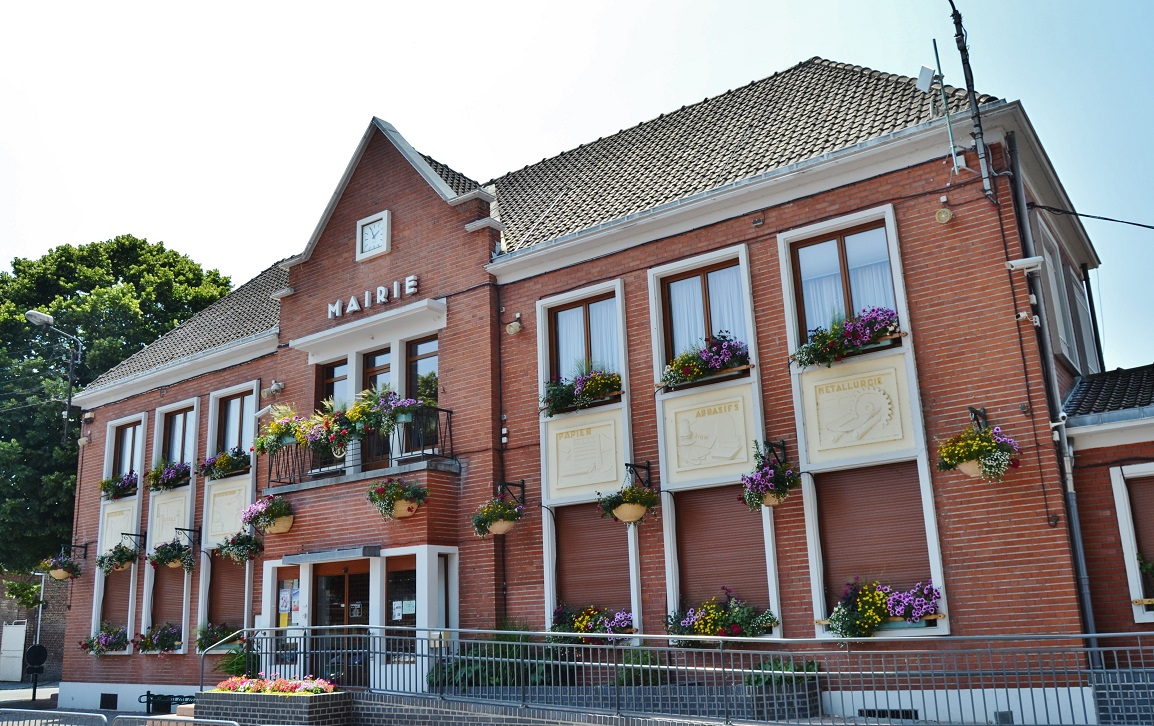
- The town hall of Corbehem

- Coat of arms
- Location of Corbehem
- Location within France Location within Hauts-de-France
- Coordinates: 50°20′10″N 3°03′39″E
- Country: France
- Region: Hauts-de-France
- Department: Pas-de-Calais
- Arrondissement: Arras
- Canton: Brebières
- Intercommunality: CC Osartis Marquion

Government
  - Mayor (2020–2026): Dominique Bertout
- Area^{1}: 2.6 km^{2} (1.0 sq mi)
- Elevation: 22 m (72 ft)
- Highest elevation: 36 m (118 ft)
- Lowest elevation: 28 m (92 ft)
- Population (2023): 2,258
  - Density: 870/km^{2} (2,200/sq mi)
- Time zone: UTC+01:00 (CET)
  - Summer (DST): UTC+02:00 (CEST)
- INSEE/Postal code: 62240 /62112
- ^{1} French Land Register data, which excludes lakes, ponds, glaciers > 1 km^{2} (0.386 sq mi or 247 acres) and river estuaries.

Corbehem (West Flemish: Corbeham) is a commune in the Pas-de-Calais department in the Hauts-de-France region of France 17 miles (27 km) northeast of Arras. The Scarpe river flows through the commune.

== Population ==
Historical population
Year	Pop.	±% p.a.
1968	2,094	—
1975	2,611	+3.20%
1982	2,368	−1.39%
1990	2,346	−0.12%
1999	2,318	−0.13%
2007	2,222	−0.53%
2012	2,298	+0.67%
2017	2,366	+0.58%
2023	2,258	−0.78%
Source: INSEE

== See also ==
- Communes of the Pas-de-Calais department
