= Rœux =

Commune in Hauts-de-France, France

- Commune
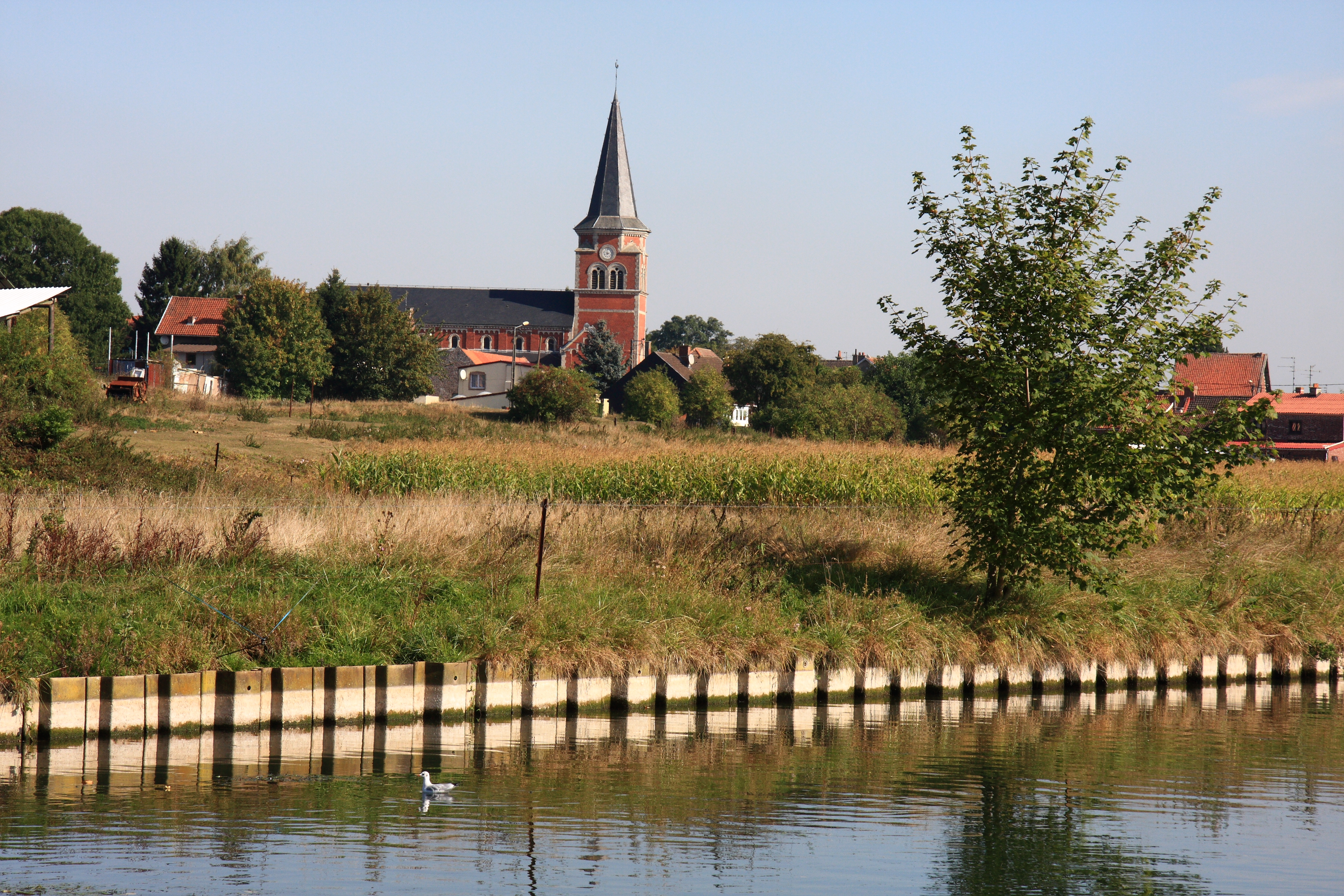
- A general view of Rœux

- Coat of arms
- Location of Rœux
- Location within France Location within Hauts-de-France
- Coordinates: 50°17′40″N 2°53′50″E
- Country: France
- Region: Hauts-de-France
- Department: Pas-de-Calais
- Arrondissement: Arras
- Canton: Brebières
- Intercommunality: CU Arras

Government
  - Mayor (2023–2026): Fabrice Delabroye
- Area^{1}: 4.87 km^{2} (1.88 sq mi)
- Elevation: 59 m (194 ft)
- Highest elevation: 71 m (233 ft)
- Lowest elevation: 43 m (141 ft)
- Population (2023): 1,381
  - Density: 284/km^{2} (734/sq mi)
- Time zone: UTC+01:00 (CET)
  - Summer (DST): UTC+02:00 (CEST)
- INSEE/Postal code: 62718 /62118
- ^{1} French Land Register data, which excludes lakes, ponds, glaciers > 1 km^{2} (0.386 sq mi or 247 acres) and river estuaries.

Rœux (French pronunciation: [ʁø]) is a commune in the Pas-de-Calais department in the Hauts-de-France region of France on the banks of the Scarpe river about 6 miles (10 km) east of Arras.

== Population ==
Historical population
Year	Pop.	±% p.a.
1968	917	—
1975	991	+1.11%
1982	1,057	+0.93%
1990	1,454	+4.07%
1999	1,458	+0.03%
2007	1,387	−0.62%
2012	1,427	+0.57%
2017	1,446	+0.26%
2023	1,381	−0.76%
Source: INSEE

== See also ==
- Communes of the Pas-de-Calais department
