= Vitry-en-Artois =

Vitry-en-Artois Vitry-in-Artoé / Vitry-la-Gueule (Picard)
- Commune
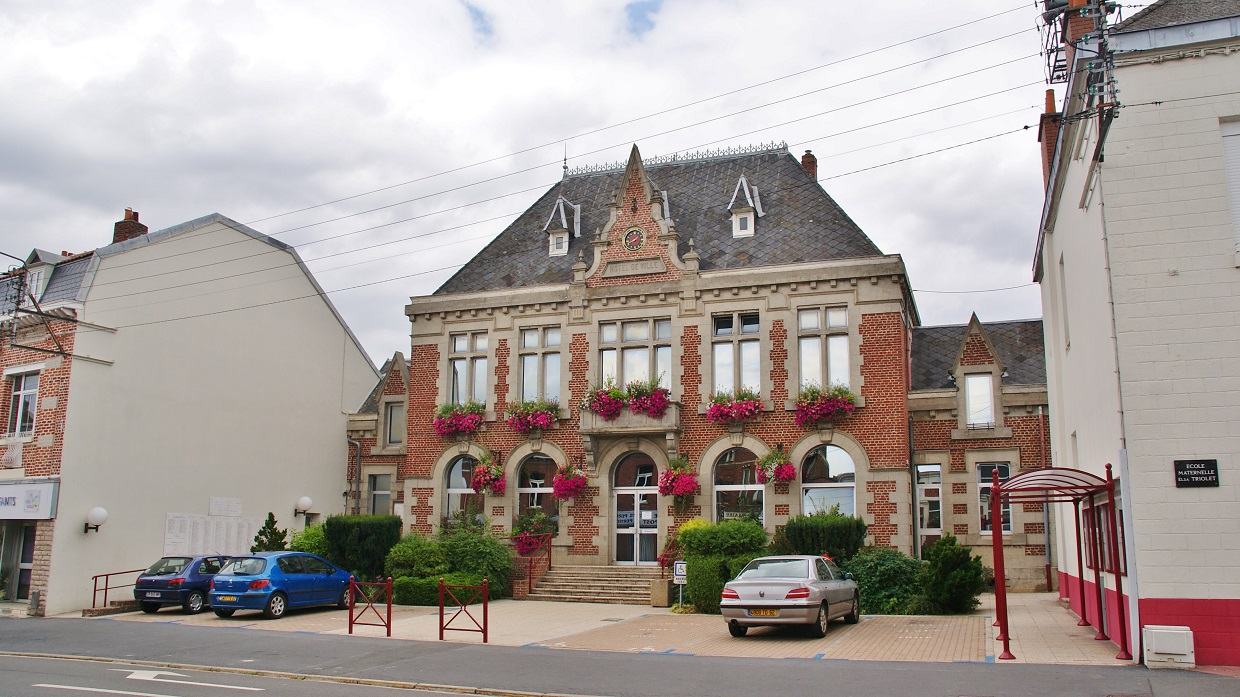
- The town hall of Vitry-en-Artois
- Location of Vitry-en-Artois
- Location within France Location within Hauts-de-France
- Coordinates: 50°19′35″N 2°59′02″E
- Country: France
- Region: Hauts-de-France
- Department: Pas-de-Calais
- Arrondissement: Arras
- Canton: Brebières
- Intercommunality: Osartis Marquion

Government
  - Mayor (2020–2026): Pierre Georget
- Area^{1}: 18.78 km^{2} (7.25 sq mi)
- Elevation: 48 m (157 ft)
- Highest elevation: 72 m (236 ft)
- Lowest elevation: 41 m (135 ft)
- Population (2023): 4,849
  - Density: 258.2/km^{2} (668.7/sq mi)
- Time zone: UTC+01:00 (CET)
  - Summer (DST): UTC+02:00 (CEST)
- INSEE/Postal code: 62865 /62490
- ^{1} French Land Register data, which excludes lakes, ponds, glaciers > 1 km^{2} (0.386 sq mi or 247 acres) and river estuaries.

Vitry-en-Artois (French: [vitʁi ɑ̃n‿aʁtwɑ]; literally "Vitry in Artois"; Picard: Vitry-in-Artoé or Vitry-la-Gueule) is a commune and in the Pas-de-Calais department in the Hauts-de-France region of France.

== Geography ==
Vitry-en-Artois is situated some 12 miles (19 km) northeast of Arras, at the junction of the N50, D39 and the D42 roads. The river Scarpe flows through the town, which is also served by the SNCF railway. The World War II German airfield was later used by the Americans, then after the war, was put to commercial use as the local aerodrome.

== Population ==
Historical population
Year	Pop.	±% p.a.
1968	3,593	—
1975	4,748	+4.06%
1982	4,738	−0.03%
1990	4,732	−0.02%
1999	4,606	−0.30%
2007	4,388	−0.60%
2012	4,600	+0.95%
2017	4,677	+0.33%
2023	4,849	+0.60%
Source: INSEE

== See also ==
- Communes of the Pas-de-Calais department
