= Haucourt, Pas-de-Calais =

Haucourt
- Commune
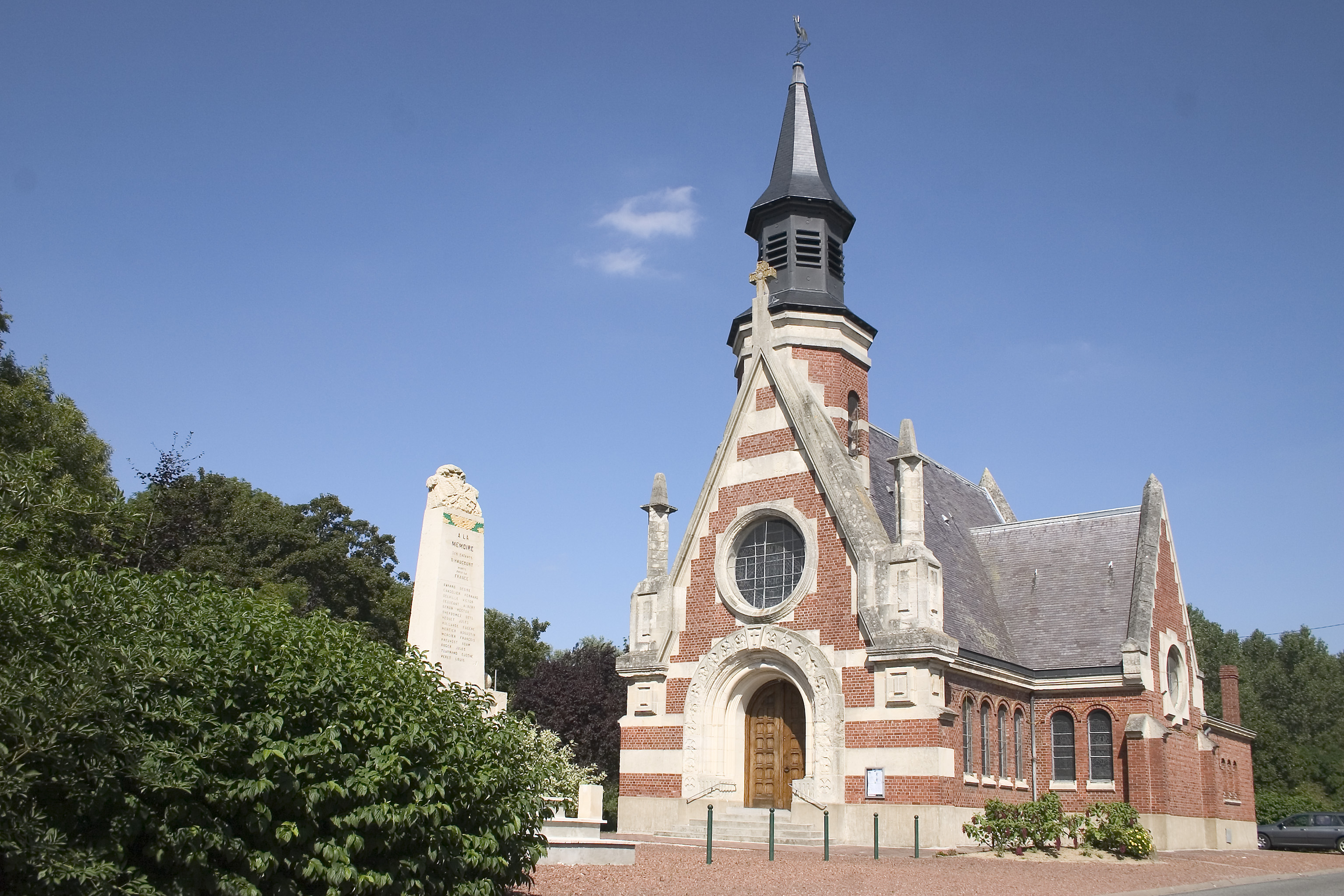
- The church of Haucourt

- Coat of arms
- Location of Haucourt
- Location within France Location within Hauts-de-France
- Coordinates: 50°14′54″N 2°57′15″E
- Country: France
- Region: Hauts-de-France
- Department: Pas-de-Calais
- Arrondissement: Arras
- Canton: Brebières
- Intercommunality: CC Osartis Marquion

Government
  - Mayor (2020–2026): Philippe Dubus
- Area^{1}: 6.06 km^{2} (2.34 sq mi)
- Elevation: 50 m (160 ft)
- Highest elevation: 86 m (282 ft)
- Lowest elevation: 48 m (157 ft)
- Population (2023): 206
  - Density: 34.0/km^{2} (88.0/sq mi)
- Time zone: UTC+01:00 (CET)
  - Summer (DST): UTC+02:00 (CEST)
- INSEE/Postal code: 62414 /62156
- ^{1} French Land Register data, which excludes lakes, ponds, glaciers > 1 km^{2} (0.386 sq mi or 247 acres) and river estuaries.

Haucourt (French pronunciation: [okuʁ]) is a commune in the Pas-de-Calais department in the Hauts-de-France region of France 12 miles (19 km) southeast of Arras.

== Population ==
Historical population
Year	Pop.	±% p.a.
1968	197	—
1975	169	−2.17%
1982	196	+2.14%
1990	233	+2.19%
1999	240	+0.33%
2007	224	−0.86%
2012	254	+2.55%
2017	238	−1.29%
2023	206	−2.38%
Source: INSEE

== See also ==
- Vis-en-Artois British Cemetery, Haucourt
- Communes of the Pas-de-Calais department
