= Boiry-Notre-Dame =

- Commune
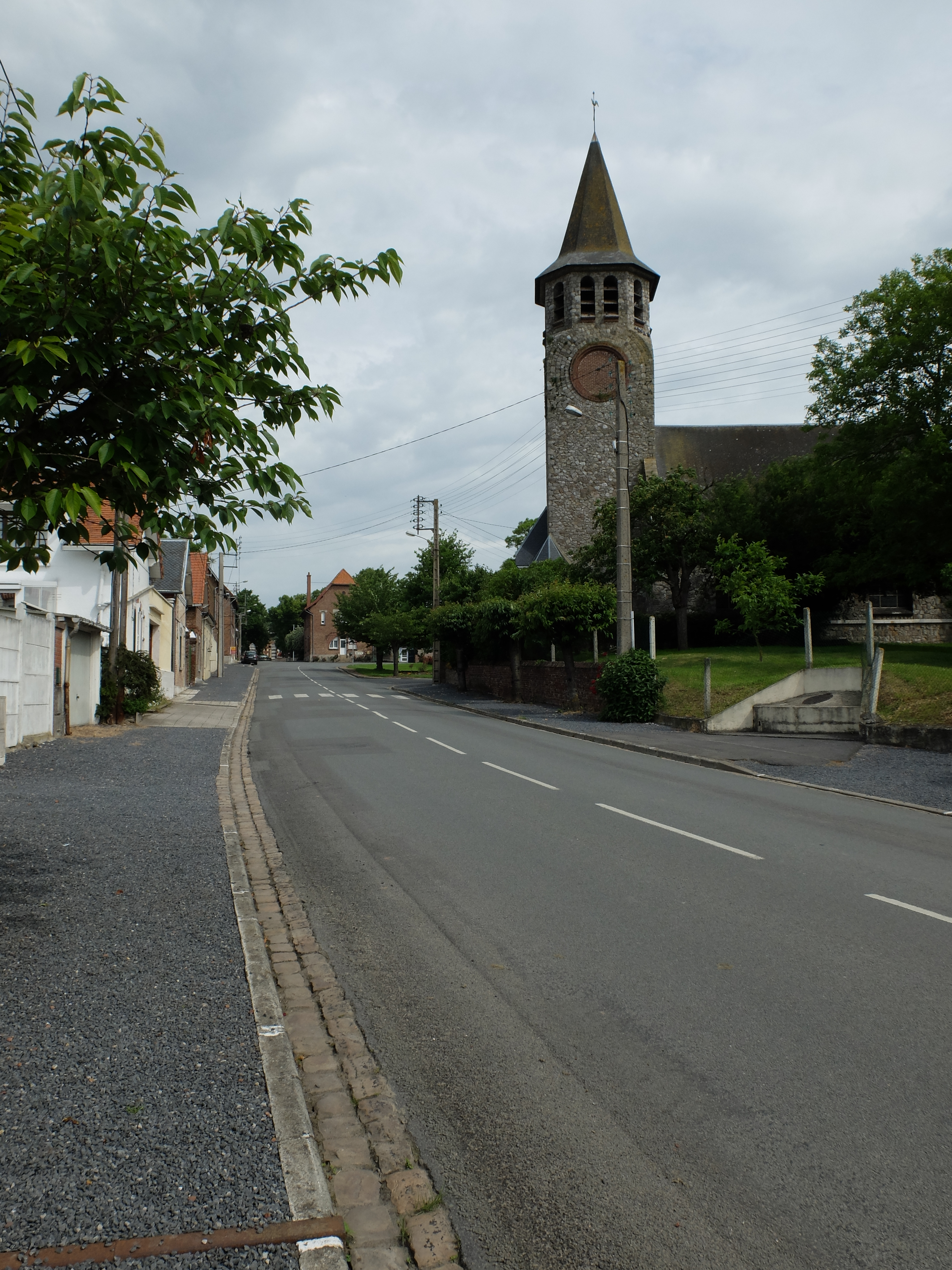
- The church of Boiry-Notre-Dame

- Coat of arms
- Location of Boiry-Notre-Dame
- Location within France Location within Hauts-de-France
- Coordinates: 50°16′25″N 2°56′41″E
- Country: France
- Region: Hauts-de-France
- Department: Pas-de-Calais
- Arrondissement: Arras
- Canton: Brebières
- Intercommunality: CC Osartis Marquion

Government
  - Mayor (2020–2026): Daniel Martiné
- Area^{1}: 6.11 km^{2} (2.36 sq mi)
- Elevation: 82 m (269 ft)
- Highest elevation: 95 m (312 ft)
- Lowest elevation: 43 m (141 ft)
- Population (2023): 450
  - Density: 74/km^{2} (190/sq mi)
- Time zone: UTC+01:00 (CET)
  - Summer (DST): UTC+02:00 (CEST)
- INSEE/Postal code: 62145 /62156
- ^{1} French Land Register data, which excludes lakes, ponds, glaciers > 1 km^{2} (0.386 sq mi or 247 acres) and river estuaries.

Boiry-Notre-Dame (French pronunciation: [bwaʁi nɔtʁ dam]) is a commune in the Pas-de-Calais department in the northern Hauts-de-France region of France 10 miles (16 km) southeast of Arras.

== Population ==
Historical population
Year	Pop.	±% p.a.
1968	389	—
1975	370	−0.71%
1982	408	+1.41%
1990	430	+0.66%
1999	418	−0.31%
2007	436	+0.53%
2012	462	+1.17%
2017	454	−0.35%
2023	450	−0.15%
Source: INSEE

== See also ==
- Communes of the Pas-de-Calais department
