= Sailly-en-Ostrevent =

- Commune
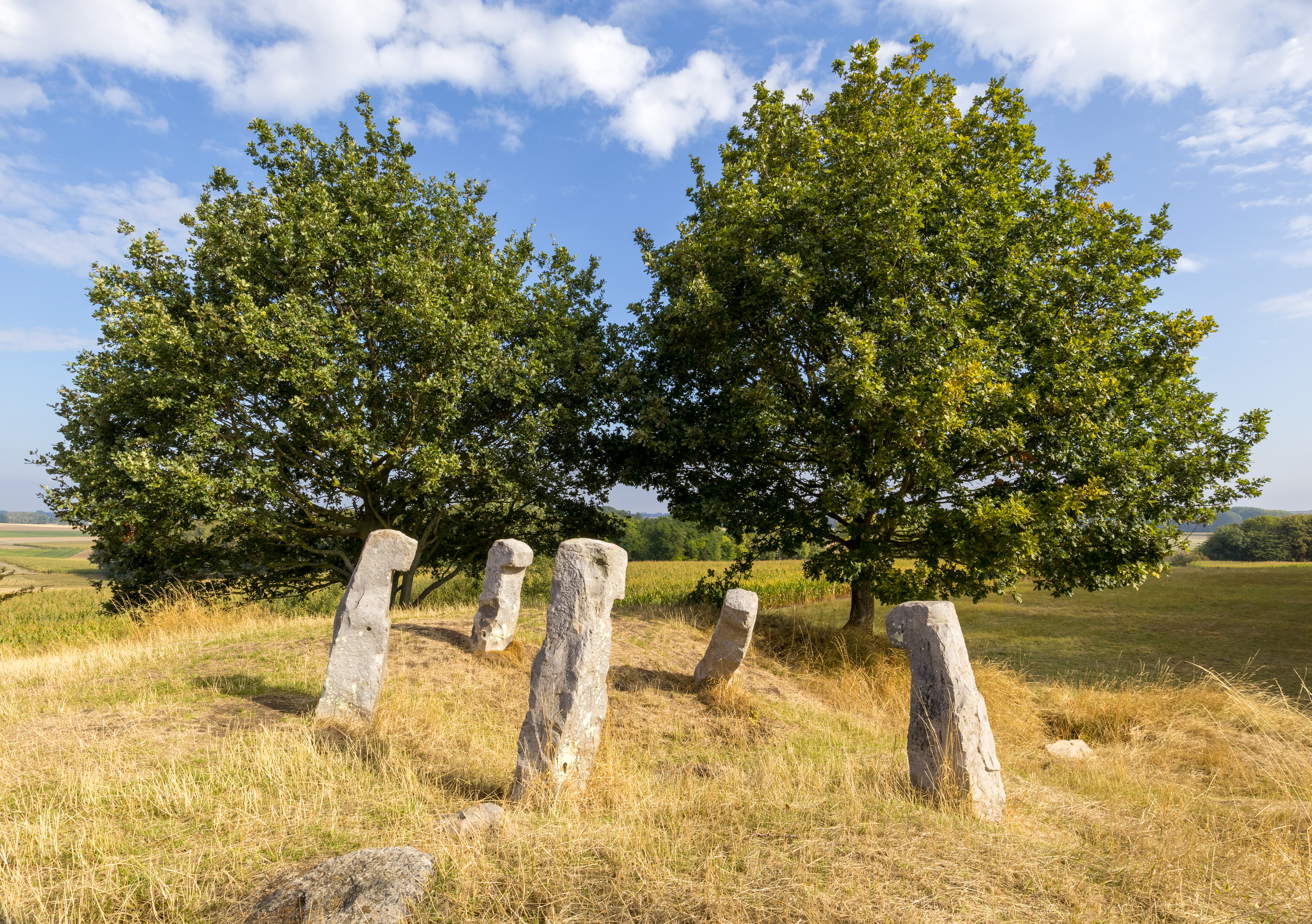
- Dolmens

- Coat of arms
- Location of Sailly-en-Ostrevent
- Location within France Location within Hauts-de-France
- Coordinates: 50°17′21″N 2°59′41″E
- Country: France
- Region: Hauts-de-France
- Department: Pas-de-Calais
- Arrondissement: Arras
- Canton: Brebières
- Intercommunality: CC Osartis Marquion

Government
  - Mayor (2022–2026): Serge Mazingue
- Area^{1}: 7.43 km^{2} (2.87 sq mi)
- Elevation: 48 m (157 ft)
- Highest elevation: 74 m (243 ft)
- Lowest elevation: 38 m (125 ft)
- Population (2023): 665
  - Density: 89.5/km^{2} (232/sq mi)
- Time zone: UTC+01:00 (CET)
  - Summer (DST): UTC+02:00 (CEST)
- INSEE/Postal code: 62734 /62490
- ^{1} French Land Register data, which excludes lakes, ponds, glaciers > 1 km^{2} (0.386 sq mi or 247 acres) and river estuaries.

Sailly-en-Ostrevent is a commune in the Pas-de-Calais department in the Hauts-de-France region of France.

== Geography ==
Sailly-en-Ostrevent lies about 12 miles (19 km) east of Arras, at the junction of the D39 and D43 roads.

== Population ==
Historical population
| Year | Pop. | ±% p.a. |
|---|---|---|
| 1968 | 660 | — |
| 1975 | 640 | −0.44% |
| 1982 | 666 | +0.57% |
| 1990 | 649 | −0.32% |
| 1999 | 647 | −0.03% |
| 2007 | 682 | +0.66% |
| 2012 | 712 | +0.86% |
| 2017 | 722 | +0.28% |
| 2023 | 665 | −1.36% |
Source: INSEE

== Places of interest ==
- The church of St. Albin, rebuilt along with much of the village after World War I.
- The cromlech of Les Bonnettes. In the fields of the commune stands a mound about five metres high, on which are erected five (there were once seven) large stones (dolmen or menhir). The last excavations took place in 1887 but no clues or evidence was discovered as to the origins of the monument.

== See also ==
- Communes of the Pas-de-Calais department
