= Éterpigny, Pas-de-Calais =

Éterpigny
- Commune
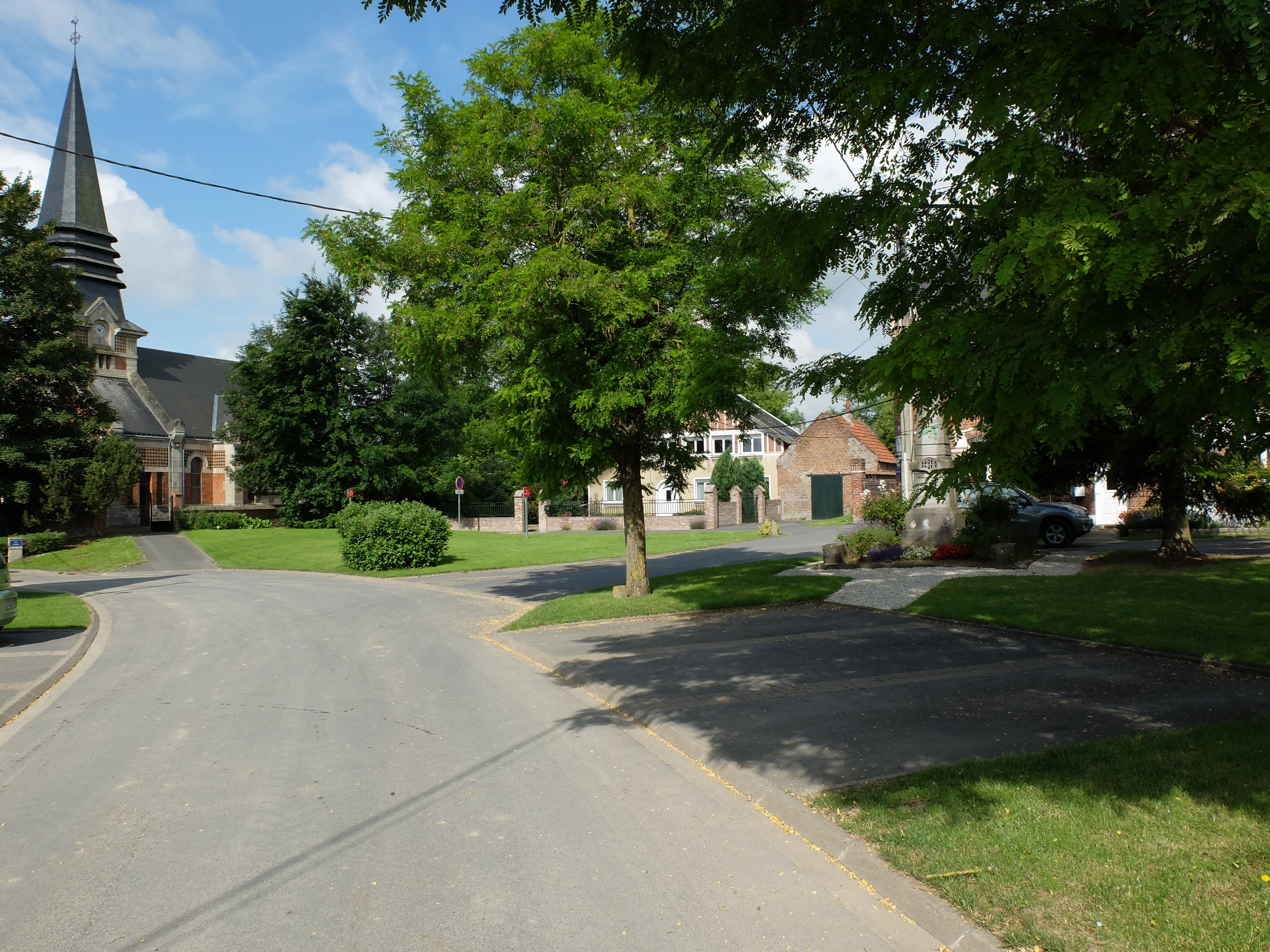
- The centre of Éterpigny

- Coat of arms
- Location of Éterpigny
- Location within France Location within Hauts-de-France
- Coordinates: 50°15′31″N 2°58′50″E
- Country: France
- Region: Hauts-de-France
- Department: Pas-de-Calais
- Arrondissement: Arras
- Canton: Brebières
- Intercommunality: CC Osartis Marquion

Government
  - Mayor (2020–2026): Thomas Meurillon
- Area^{1}: 3.49 km^{2} (1.35 sq mi)
- Elevation: 28 m (92 ft)
- Highest elevation: 67 m (220 ft)
- Lowest elevation: 41 m (135 ft)
- Population (2023): 252
  - Density: 72.2/km^{2} (187/sq mi)
- Time zone: UTC+01:00 (CET)
  - Summer (DST): UTC+02:00 (CEST)
- INSEE/Postal code: 62319 /62156
- ^{1} French Land Register data, which excludes lakes, ponds, glaciers > 1 km^{2} (0.386 sq mi or 247 acres) and river estuaries.

Éterpigny (French pronunciation: [etɛʁpiɲi]) is a commune in the Pas-de-Calais department in the Hauts-de-France region of northern France.

== Geography ==
It is a farming village located approximately 9 miles (14 km) southeast of Arras, on the D9 road. The A26 autoroute passes about half a mile from the village.

== Population ==
Historical population
Year	Pop.	±% p.a.
1968	119	—
1975	123	+0.47%
1982	158	+3.64%
1990	202	+3.12%
1999	167	−2.09%
2007	219	+3.45%
2012	244	+2.19%
2017	258	+1.12%
2023	252	−0.39%
Source: INSEE

== See also ==
- Communes of the Pas-de-Calais department
