= Étaing =

- Commune
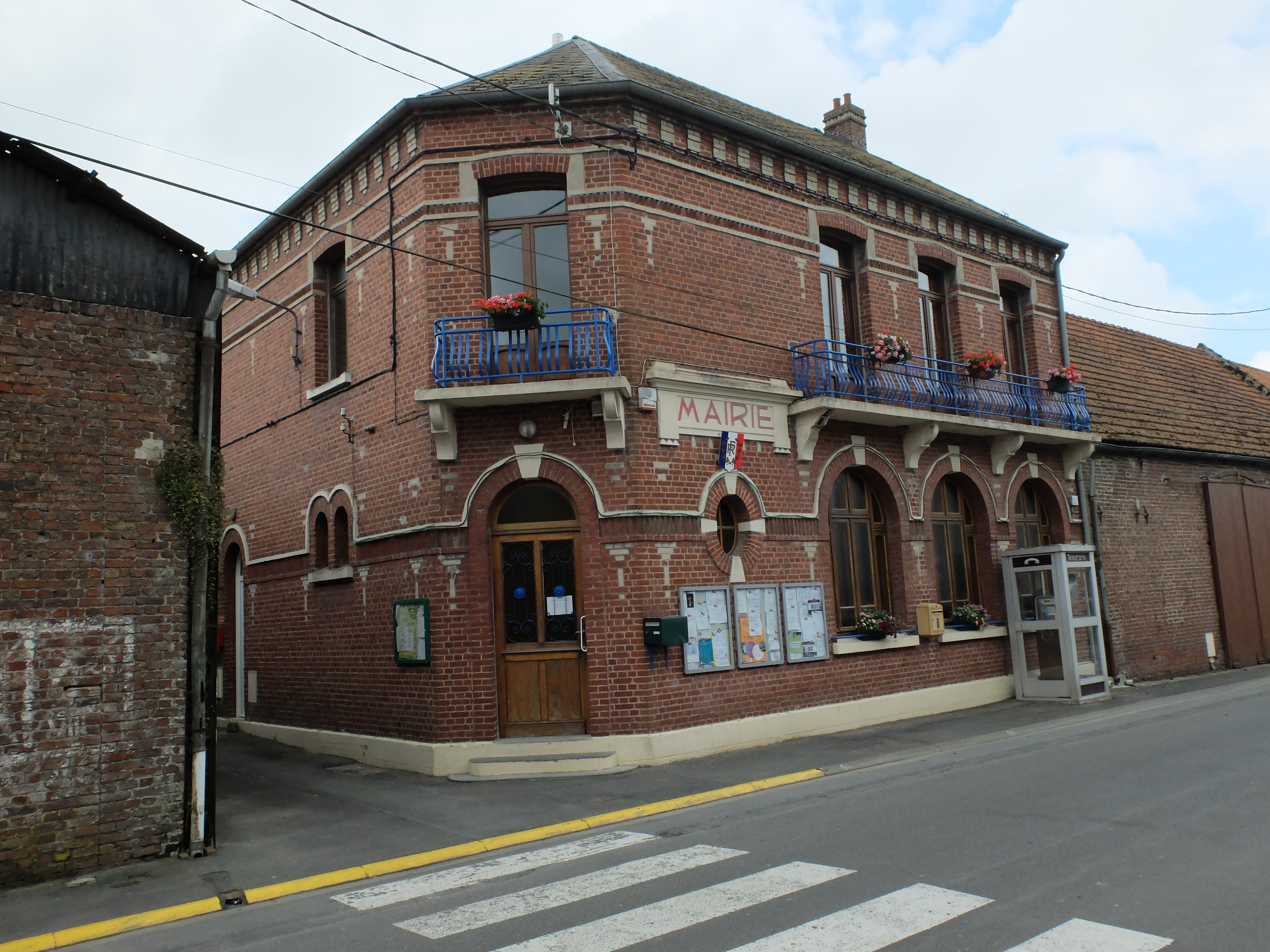
- The town hall of Étaing

- Coat of arms
- Location of Étaing
- Location within France Location within Hauts-de-France
- Coordinates: 50°16′28″N 3°00′02″E
- Country: France
- Region: Hauts-de-France
- Department: Pas-de-Calais
- Arrondissement: Arras
- Canton: Brebières
- Intercommunality: CC Osartis Marquion

Government
  - Mayor (2020–2026): Jean-Louis Capiez
- Area^{1}: 5.1 km^{2} (2.0 sq mi)
- Elevation: 43 m (141 ft)
- Highest elevation: 74 m (243 ft)
- Lowest elevation: 37 m (121 ft)
- Population (2023): 476
  - Density: 93/km^{2} (240/sq mi)
- Time zone: UTC+01:00 (CET)
  - Summer (DST): UTC+02:00 (CEST)
- INSEE/Postal code: 62317 /62156
- ^{1} French Land Register data, which excludes lakes, ponds, glaciers > 1 km^{2} (0.386 sq mi or 247 acres) and river estuaries.

Étaing (French pronunciation: [etɛ̃]) is a commune in the Pas-de-Calais department in the Hauts-de-France region of France 11 miles (18 km) east of Arras, in the valley of the river Sensée.

== Population ==
Historical population
Year	Pop.	±% p.a.
1968	353	—
1975	383	+1.17%
1982	366	−0.65%
1990	356	−0.35%
1999	367	+0.34%
2007	423	+1.79%
2012	442	+0.88%
2017	450	+0.36%
2023	476	+0.94%
Source: INSEE

== See also ==
- Communes of the Pas-de-Calais department
