= Rémy, Pas-de-Calais =

Rémy
- Commune
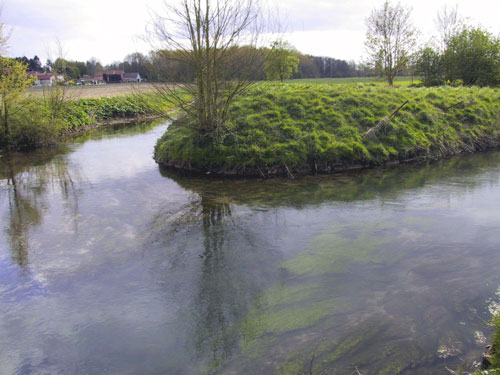
- The Sensée

- Coat of arms
- Location of Rémy
- Location within France Location within Hauts-de-France
- Coordinates: 50°15′16″N 2°57′24″E
- Country: France
- Region: Hauts-de-France
- Department: Pas-de-Calais
- Arrondissement: Arras
- Canton: Brebières
- Intercommunality: CC Osartis Marquion

Government
  - Mayor (2020–2026): Annick Danel
- Area^{1}: 3.59 km^{2} (1.39 sq mi)
- Elevation: 45 m (148 ft)
- Highest elevation: 71 m (233 ft)
- Lowest elevation: 42 m (138 ft)
- Population (2023): 394
  - Density: 110/km^{2} (284/sq mi)
- Time zone: UTC+01:00 (CET)
  - Summer (DST): UTC+02:00 (CEST)
- INSEE/Postal code: 62703 /62156
- ^{1} French Land Register data, which excludes lakes, ponds, glaciers > 1 km^{2} (0.386 sq mi or 247 acres) and river estuaries.

Rémy (French pronunciation: [ʁemi]; Picard: R’my) is a commune in the department of Pas-de-Calais in the Hauts-de-France region of France in the valley of the river Sensée, about 10 miles (16 km) southeast of Arras.

== Population ==
Historical population
| Year | Pop. | ±% p.a. |
|---|---|---|
| 1968 | 151 | — |
| 1975 | 178 | +2.38% |
| 1982 | 213 | +2.60% |
| 1990 | 254 | +2.22% |
| 1999 | 265 | +0.47% |
| 2007 | 242 | −1.13% |
| 2012 | 280 | +2.96% |
| 2017 | 395 | +7.12% |
| 2023 | 394 | −0.04% |
Source: INSEE

== See also ==
- Communes of the Pas-de-Calais department
