= Fresnes-lès-Montauban =

- Commune
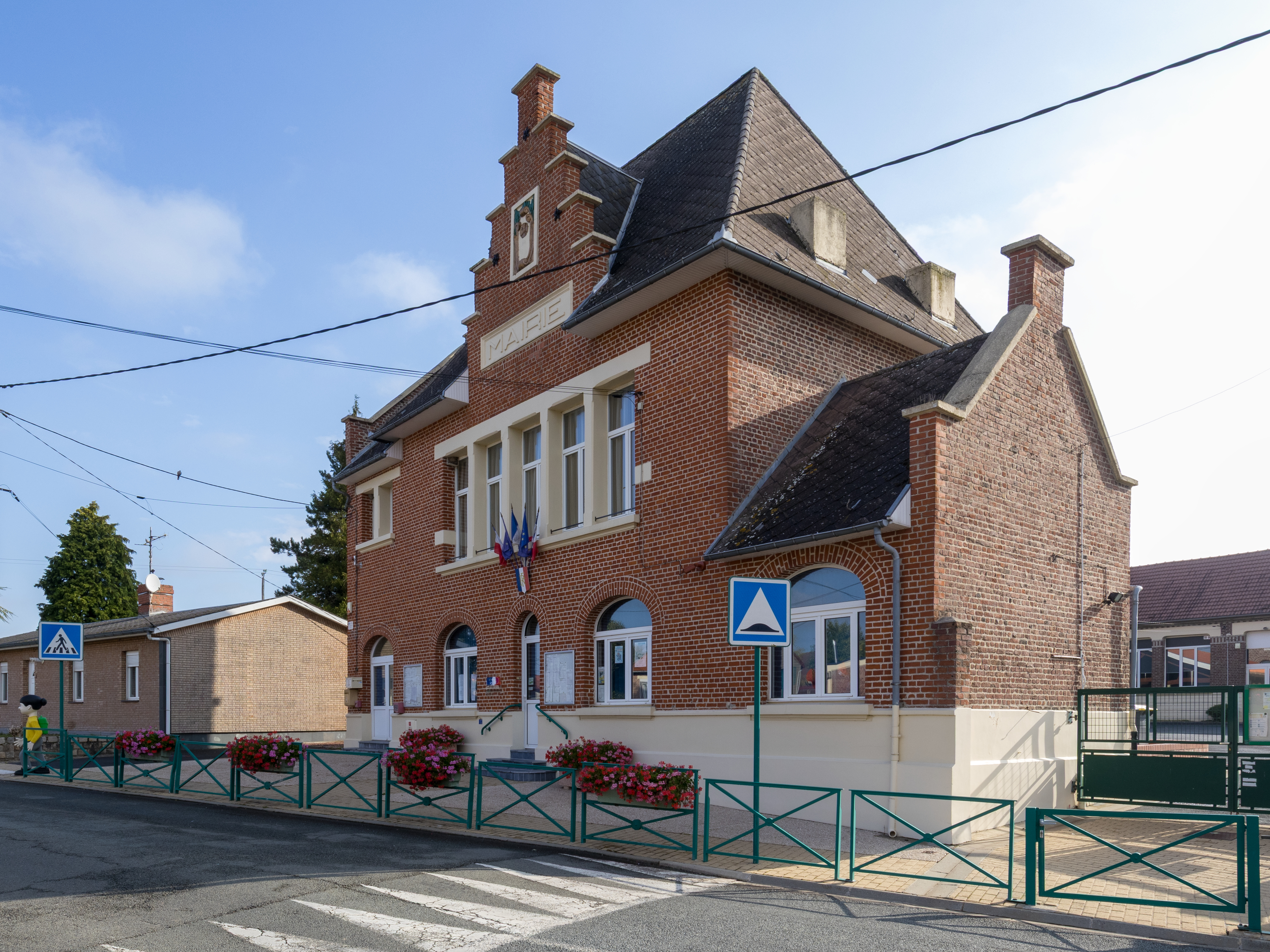
- The town hall of Fresnes-lès-Montauban

- Coat of arms
- Location of Fresnes-lès-Montauban
- Location within France Location within Hauts-de-France
- Coordinates: 50°20′01″N 2°55′55″E
- Country: France
- Region: Hauts-de-France
- Department: Pas-de-Calais
- Arrondissement: Arras
- Canton: Brebières
- Intercommunality: CC Osartis Marquion

Government
  - Mayor (2020–2026): Annie Lemoine
- Area^{1}: 4.95 km^{2} (1.91 sq mi)
- Elevation: 45 m (148 ft)
- Highest elevation: 63 m (207 ft)
- Lowest elevation: 41 m (135 ft)
- Population (2023): 604
  - Density: 122/km^{2} (316/sq mi)
- Time zone: UTC+01:00 (CET)
  - Summer (DST): UTC+02:00 (CEST)
- INSEE/Postal code: 62355 /62490
- ^{1} French Land Register data, which excludes lakes, ponds, glaciers > 1 km^{2} (0.386 sq mi or 247 acres) and river estuaries.

Fresnes-lès-Montauban (French pronunciation: [fʁɛn lɛ mɔ̃tobɑ̃]) is a commune in the Pas-de-Calais department in the Hauts-de-France region of France 9 miles (14 km) northeast of Arras.

== Population ==
Historical population
Year	Pop.	±% p.a.
1968	380	—
1975	386	+0.22%
1982	454	+2.35%
1990	538	+2.14%
1999	499	−0.83%
2007	475	−0.61%
2012	518	+1.75%
2017	572	+2.00%
2023	604	+0.91%
Source: INSEE

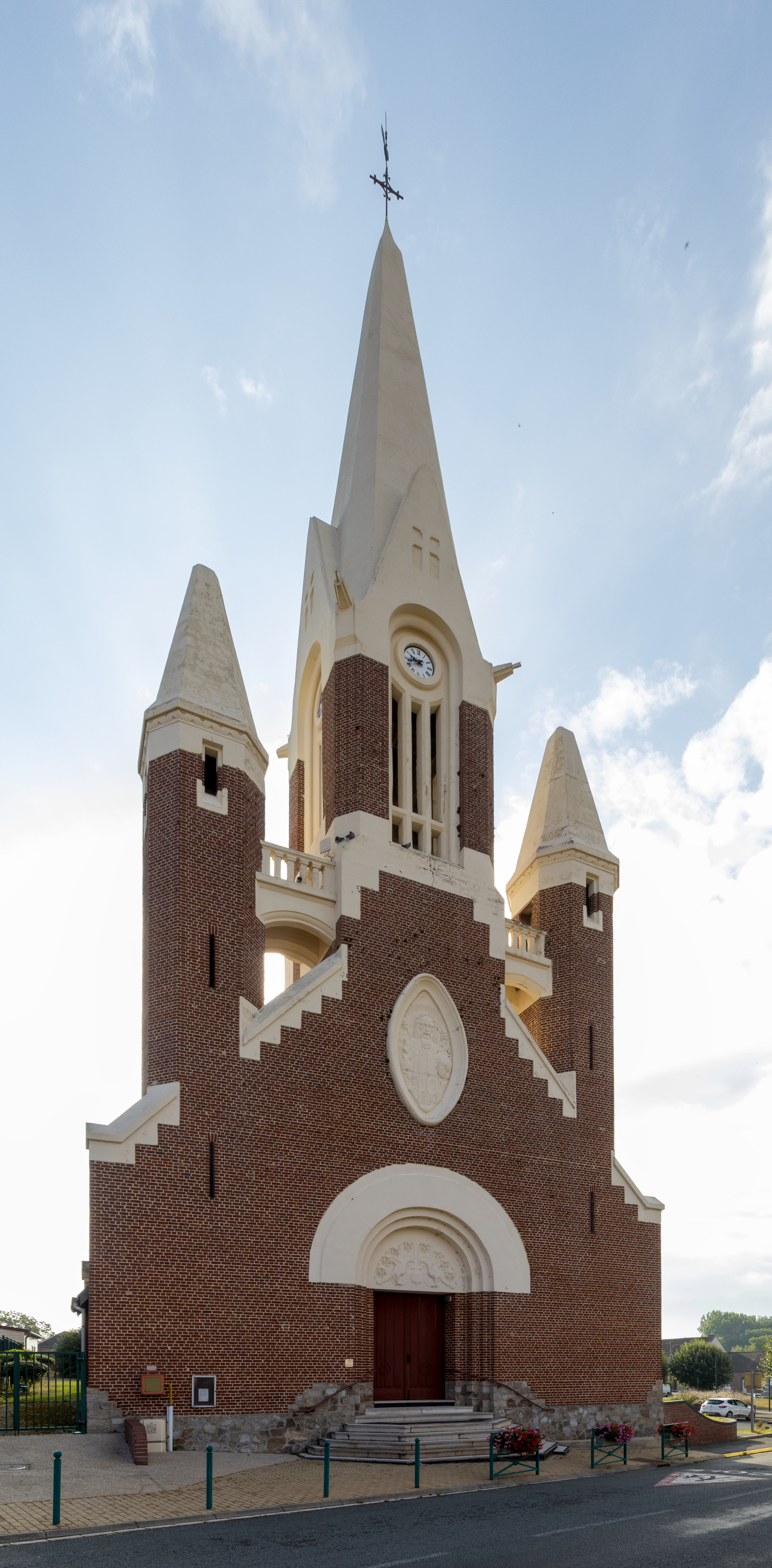
The church

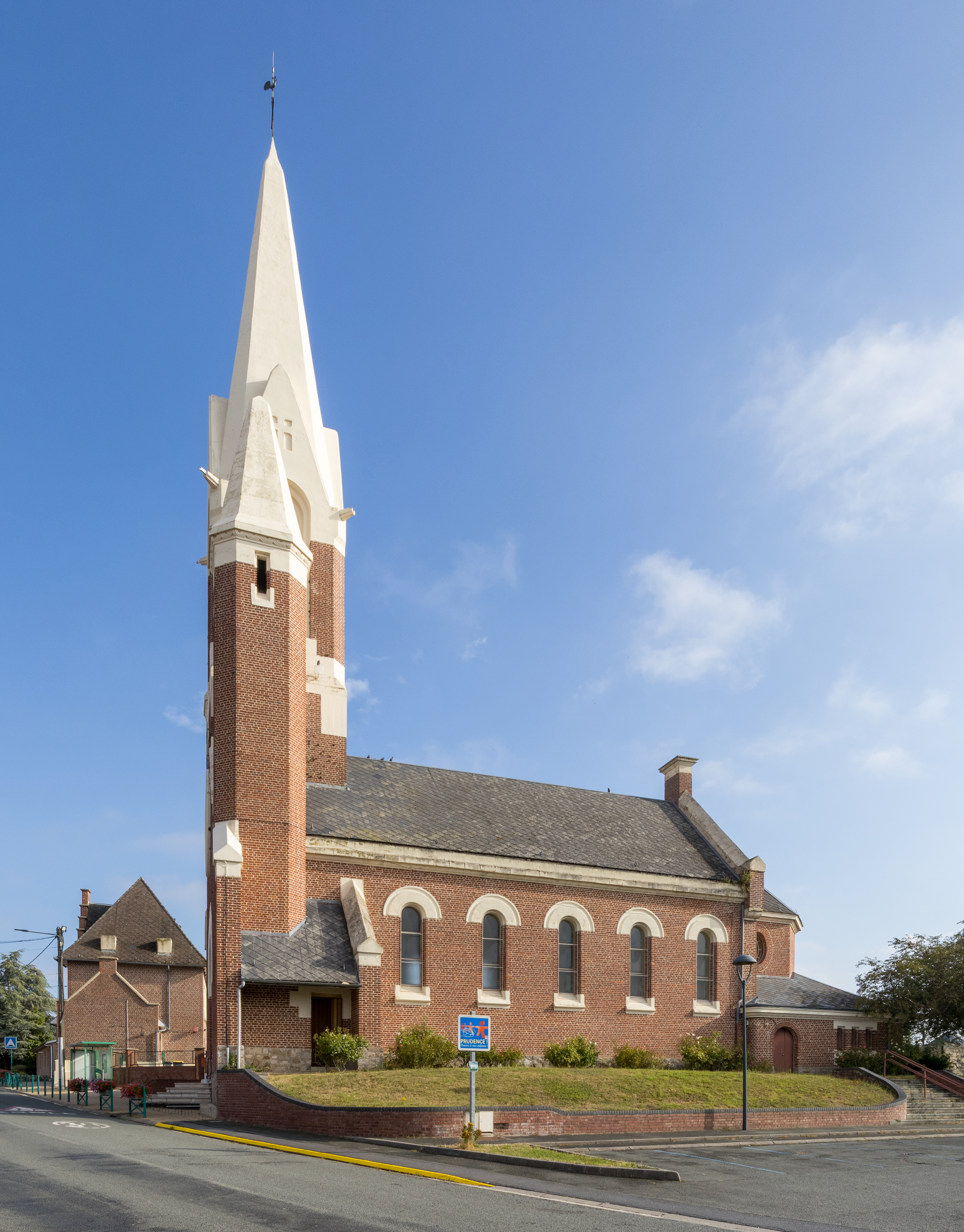
Our Lady

== See also ==
- Communes of the Pas-de-Calais department
