= Dury, Pas-de-Calais =

Dury
- Commune
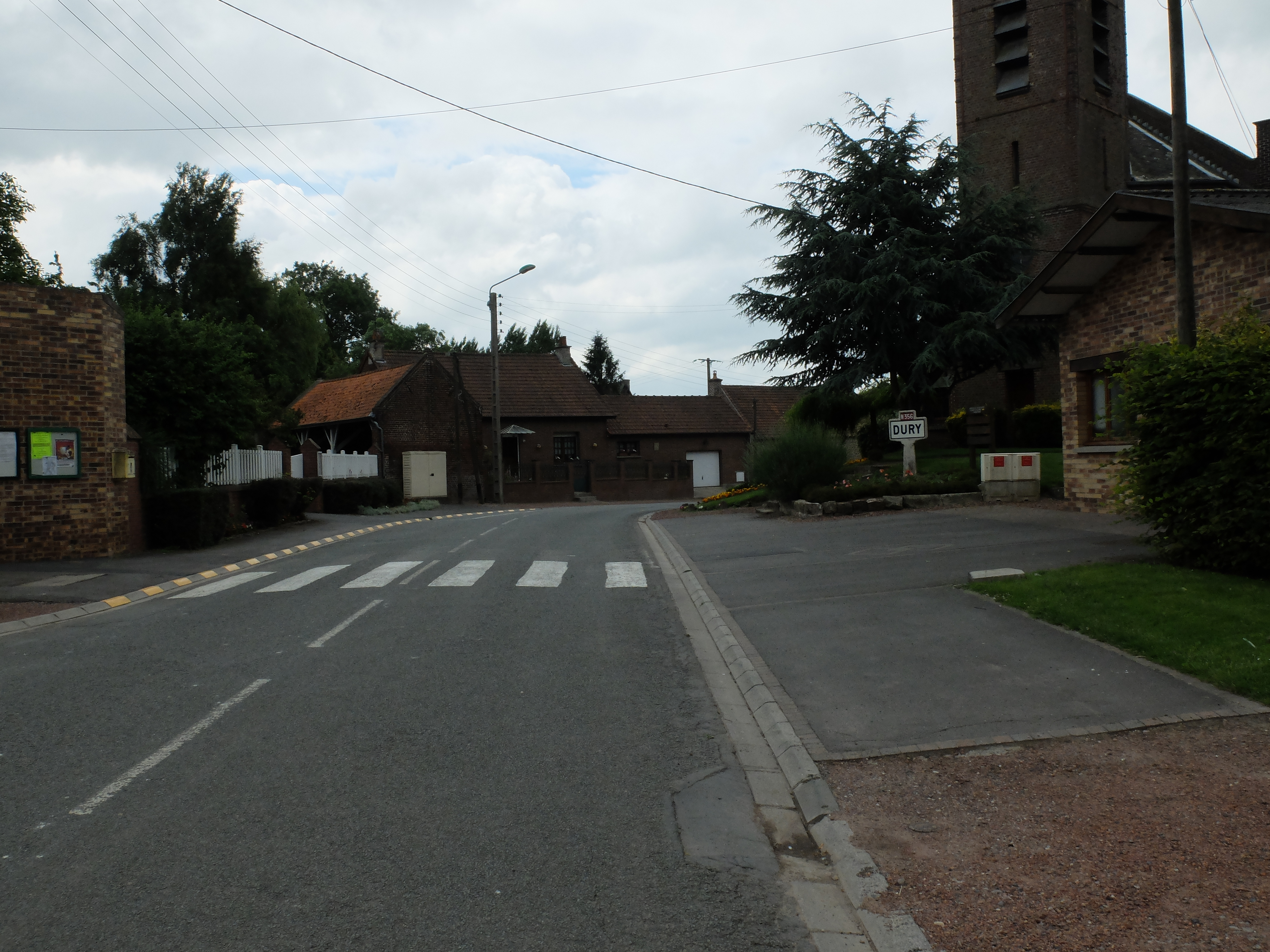
- The centre of Dury

- Coat of arms
- Location of Dury
- Location within France Location within Hauts-de-France
- Coordinates: 50°14′51″N 3°00′32″E
- Country: France
- Region: Hauts-de-France
- Department: Pas-de-Calais
- Arrondissement: Arras
- Canton: Brebières
- Intercommunality: CC Osartis Marquion

Government
  - Mayor (2020–2026): Marc Campbell
- Area^{1}: 5.31 km^{2} (2.05 sq mi)
- Elevation: 71 m (233 ft)
- Highest elevation: 77 m (253 ft)
- Lowest elevation: 52 m (171 ft)
- Population (2023): 301
  - Density: 56.7/km^{2} (147/sq mi)
- Time zone: UTC+01:00 (CET)
  - Summer (DST): UTC+02:00 (CEST)
- INSEE/Postal code: 62280 /62156
- ^{1} French Land Register data, which excludes lakes, ponds, glaciers > 1 km^{2} (0.386 sq mi or 247 acres) and river estuaries.

Dury (French pronunciation: [dyʁi]) is a commune in the Pas-de-Calais department in the Hauts-de-France region of France 10 miles (16 km) southeast of Arras.

== Population ==
Historical population
Year	Pop.	±% p.a.
1968	308	—
1975	275	−1.61%
1982	251	−1.30%
1990	306	+2.51%
1999	295	−0.41%
2007	350	+2.16%
2012	346	−0.23%
2017	350	+0.23%
2023	301	−2.48%
Source: INSEE

== See also ==
- Communes of the Pas-de-Calais department
