= Tortequesne =

- Commune
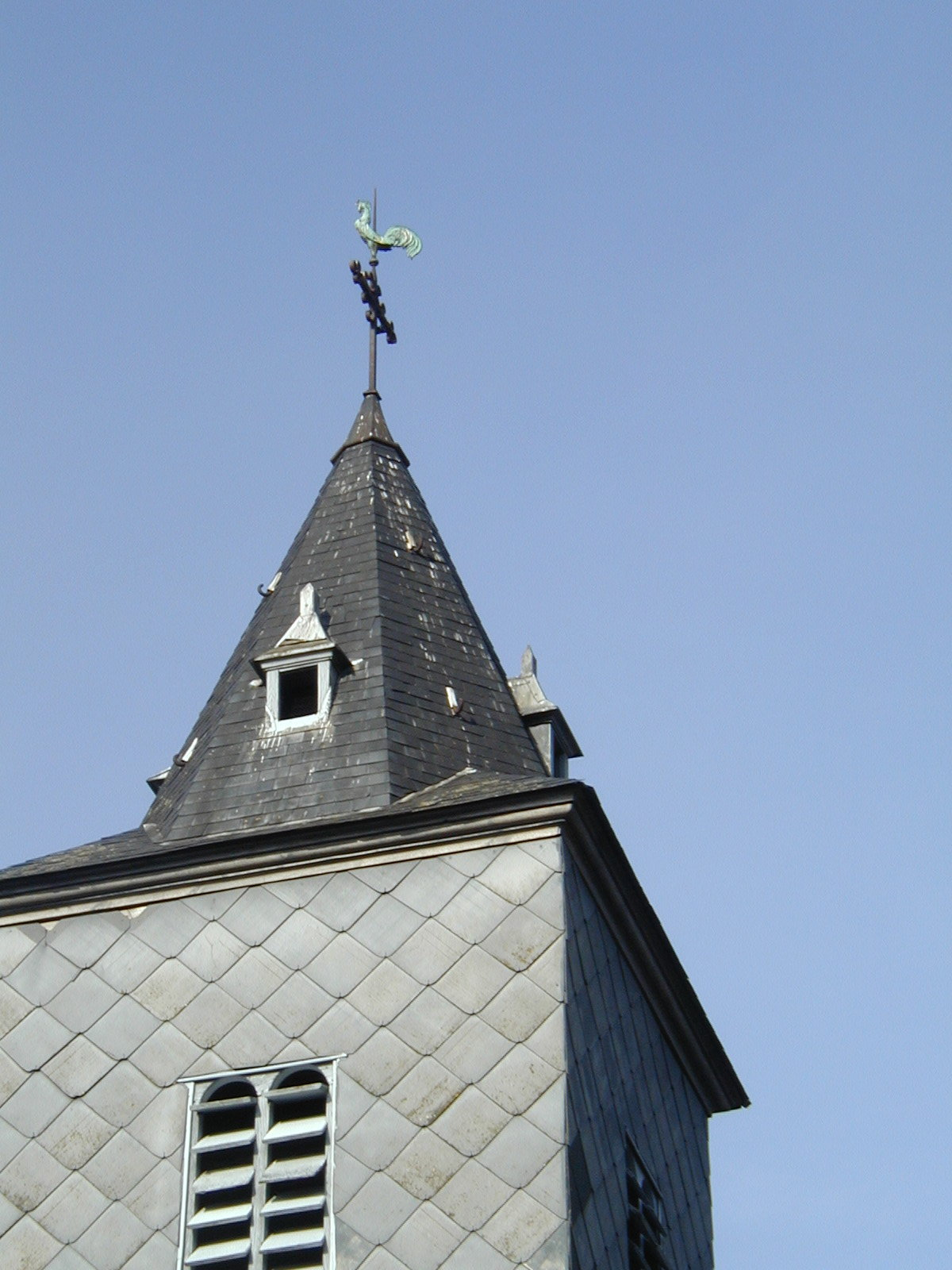
- The bell tower of the church

- Coat of arms
- Location of Tortequesne
- Location within France Location within Hauts-de-France
- Coordinates: 50°17′24″N 3°02′23″E
- Country: France
- Region: Hauts-de-France
- Department: Pas-de-Calais
- Arrondissement: Arras
- Canton: Brebières
- Intercommunality: CC Osartis Marquion

Government
  - Mayor (2020–2026): Jean-Paul Pont
- Area^{1}: 3.37 km^{2} (1.30 sq mi)
- Elevation: 42 m (138 ft)
- Highest elevation: 71 m (233 ft)
- Lowest elevation: 36 m (118 ft)
- Population (2023): 907
  - Density: 269/km^{2} (697/sq mi)
- Time zone: UTC+01:00 (CET)
  - Summer (DST): UTC+02:00 (CEST)
- INSEE/Postal code: 62825 /62490
- ^{1} French Land Register data, which excludes lakes, ponds, glaciers > 1 km^{2} (0.386 sq mi or 247 acres) and river estuaries.

Tortequesne (French pronunciation: [tɔʁtəkɛn]) is a commune in the Pas-de-Calais department in the Hauts-de-France region of France.

== Geography ==
Tortequesne is surrounded by lakes and marshland, 13 miles (21 km) east of Arras, at the junction of the D43 and D956 roads and on the border with the department of Nord.

== Population ==
Historical population
Year	Pop.	±% p.a.
1968	489	—
1975	504	+0.43%
1982	578	+1.98%
1990	719	+2.77%
1999	686	−0.52%
2007	716	+0.54%
2012	724	+0.22%
2017	826	+2.67%
2023	907	+1.57%
Source: INSEE

== Places of interest ==
- The church of St. Martin, dating from the nineteenth century.

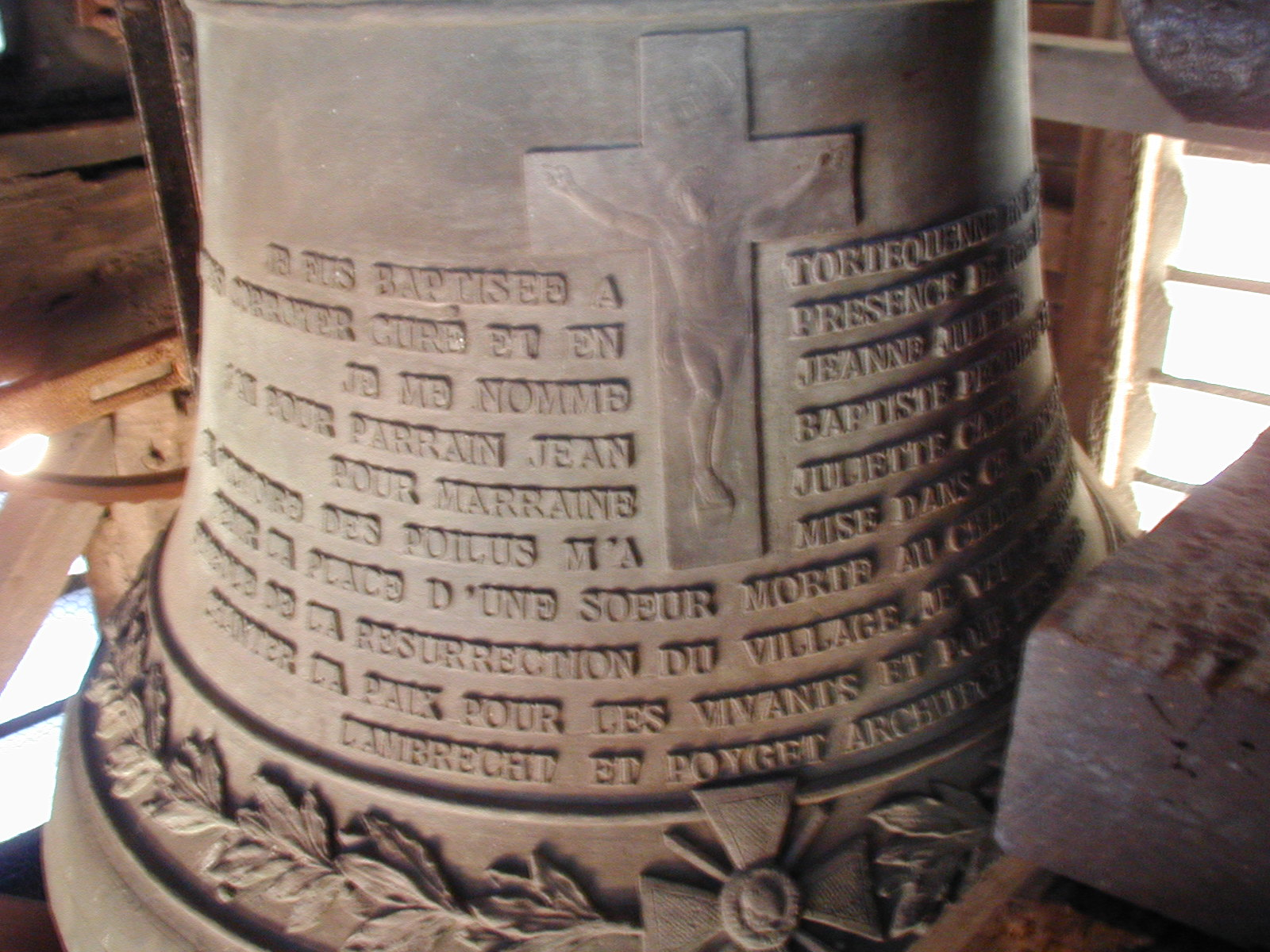
‘Jeanne-Juliette’, the church bell, installed in 1923

== See also ==
- Communes of the Pas-de-Calais department
