= Plouvain =

- Commune
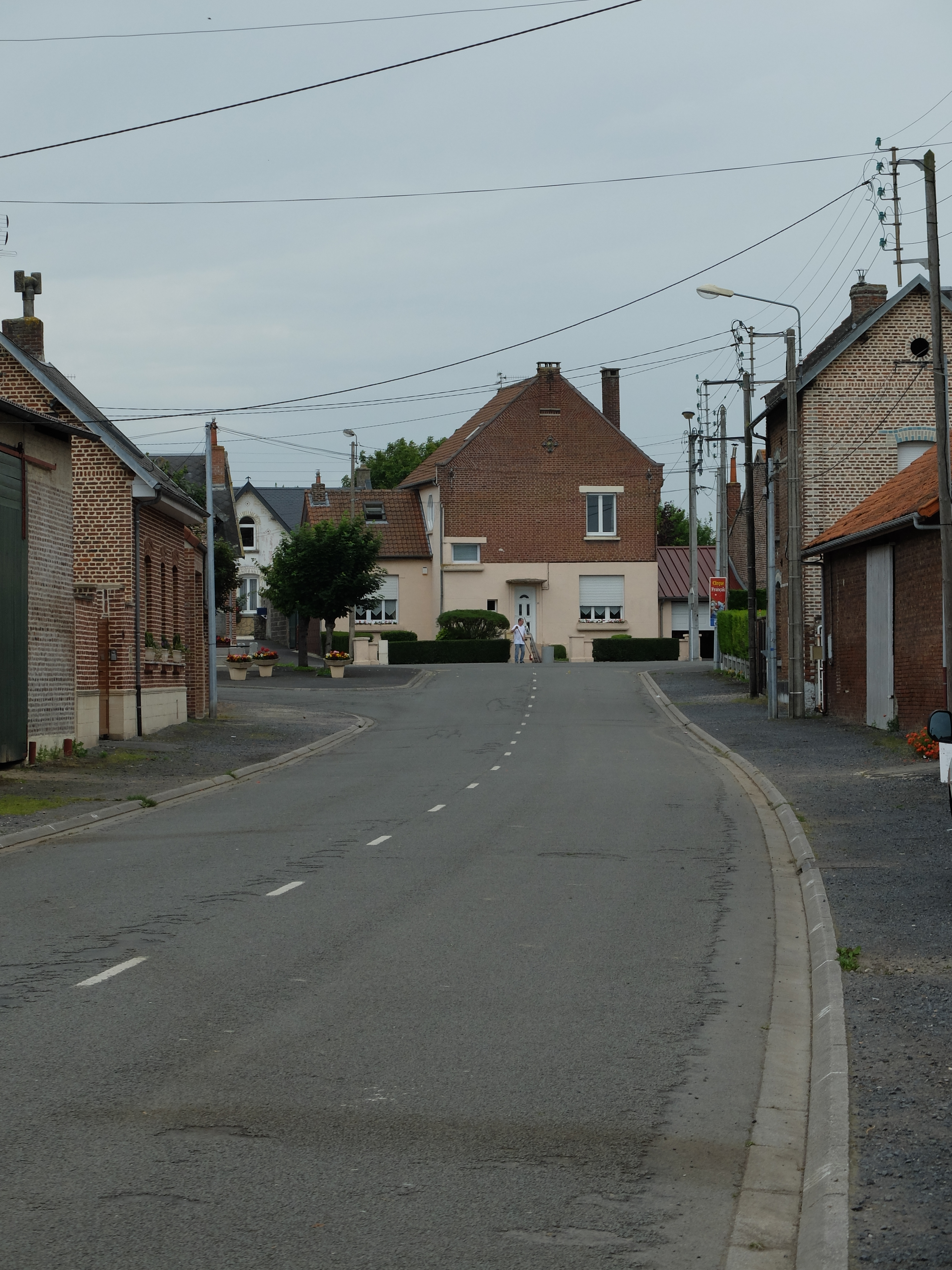
- The main road of Plouvain

- Coat of arms
- Location of Plouvain
- Location within France Location within Hauts-de-France
- Coordinates: 50°18′25″N 2°55′35″E
- Country: France
- Region: Hauts-de-France
- Department: Pas-de-Calais
- Arrondissement: Arras
- Canton: Brebières
- Intercommunality: CC Osartis Marquion

Government
  - Mayor (2024–2026): Raoul Lesage
- Area^{1}: 2.41 km^{2} (0.93 sq mi)
- Elevation: 61 m (200 ft)
- Highest elevation: 71 m (233 ft)
- Lowest elevation: 42 m (138 ft)
- Population (2023): 452
  - Density: 188/km^{2} (486/sq mi)
- Time zone: UTC+01:00 (CET)
  - Summer (DST): UTC+02:00 (CEST)
- INSEE/Postal code: 62660 /62118
- ^{1} French Land Register data, which excludes lakes, ponds, glaciers > 1 km^{2} (0.386 sq mi or 247 acres) and river estuaries.

Plouvain (French pronunciation: [pluvɛ̃]) is a commune in the Pas-de-Calais department in the Hauts-de-France region of France.

== Geography ==
Plouvain is situated 5 miles (8 km) east of Arras, at the junction of the D42 and the D46 roads. The junction of the A1 and the A26 autoroutes is less than a mile away.

== Population ==
Historical population
Year	Pop.	±% p.a.
1968	288	—
1975	309	+1.01%
1982	386	+3.23%
1990	439	+1.62%
1999	460	+0.52%
2007	482	+0.59%
2012	451	−1.32%
2017	454	+0.13%
2023	452	−0.07%
Source: INSEE

== Places of interest ==
- The church of St. Anne, rebuilt along with the rest of the village, after World War I.
- The Commonwealth War Graves Commission burials.

== See also ==
- Communes of the Pas-de-Calais department
