= Récourt =

- Commune
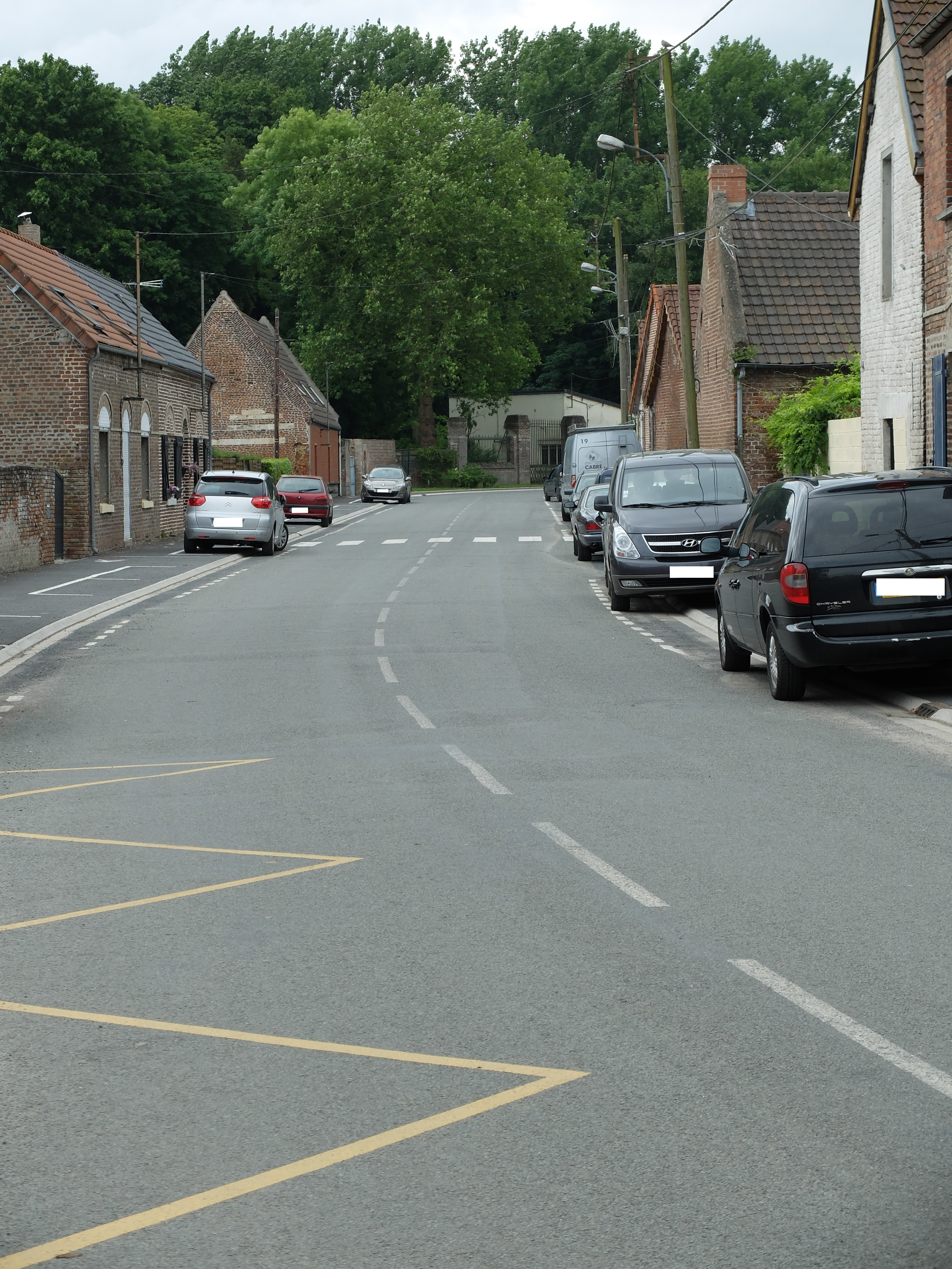
- The main road of Récourt

- Coat of arms
- Location of Récourt
- Location within France Location within Hauts-de-France
- Coordinates: 50°15′15″N 3°02′11″E
- Country: France
- Region: Hauts-de-France
- Department: Pas-de-Calais
- Arrondissement: Arras
- Canton: Brebières
- Intercommunality: CC Osartis Marquion

Government
  - Mayor (2020–2026): Danièle Delannoy
- Area^{1}: 3.33 km^{2} (1.29 sq mi)
- Elevation: 59 m (194 ft)
- Highest elevation: 74 m (243 ft)
- Lowest elevation: 43 m (141 ft)
- Population (2023): 318
  - Density: 95.5/km^{2} (247/sq mi)
- Time zone: UTC+01:00 (CET)
  - Summer (DST): UTC+02:00 (CEST)
- INSEE/Postal code: 62697 /62860
- ^{1} French Land Register data, which excludes lakes, ponds, glaciers > 1 km^{2} (0.386 sq mi or 247 acres) and river estuaries.

Récourt (French pronunciation: [ʁekuʁ]) is a commune in the Pas-de-Calais department in the Hauts-de-France region of France about 14 miles (23 km) east of Arras.

== Population ==
The inhabitants are called Récourtois in French.

Historical population
Year	Pop.	±% p.a.
1968	103	—
1975	82	−3.20%
1982	101	+3.02%
1990	199	+8.85%
1999	221	+1.17%
2007	231	+0.55%
2012	231	+0.00%
2017	211	−1.79%
2023	318	+7.08%
Source: INSEE

== See also ==
- Communes of the Pas-de-Calais department
