= Bellonne =

- Commune
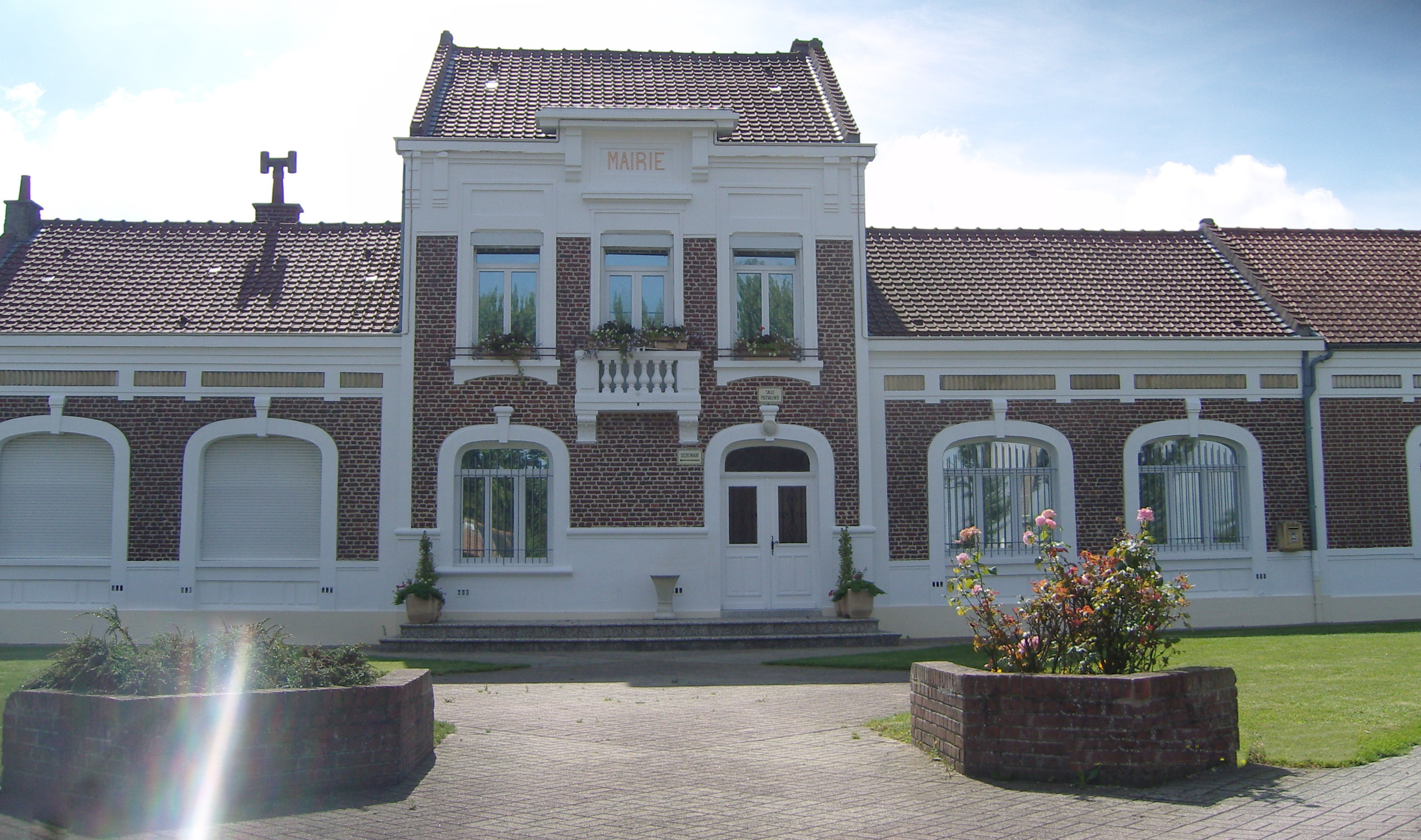
- The town hall of Bellonne

- Coat of arms
- Location of Bellonne
- Location within France Location within Hauts-de-France
- Coordinates: 50°18′11″N 3°02′38″E
- Country: France
- Region: Hauts-de-France
- Department: Pas-de-Calais
- Arrondissement: Arras
- Canton: Brebières
- Intercommunality: CC Osartis Marquion

Government
  - Mayor (2020–2026): Bernard Gaudefroy
- Area^{1}: 2.03 km^{2} (0.78 sq mi)
- Elevation: 65 m (213 ft)
- Highest elevation: 67 m (220 ft)
- Lowest elevation: 43 m (141 ft)
- Population (2023): 212
  - Density: 104/km^{2} (270/sq mi)
- Time zone: UTC+01:00 (CET)
  - Summer (DST): UTC+02:00 (CEST)
- INSEE/Postal code: 62106 /62490
- ^{1} French Land Register data, which excludes lakes, ponds, glaciers > 1 km^{2} (0.386 sq mi or 247 acres) and river estuaries.

Bellonne (French pronunciation: [bɛlɔn]) is a commune in the Pas-de-Calais department in the Hauts-de-France region in northern France.

== Geography ==
A small village located 12 miles (19 km) east of Arras on the D44 road.

== Population ==
Historical population
| Year | Pop. | ±% p.a. |
|---|---|---|
| 1968 | 115 | — |
| 1975 | 127 | +1.43% |
| 1982 | 166 | +3.90% |
| 1990 | 263 | +5.92% |
| 1999 | 249 | −0.61% |
| 2007 | 257 | +0.40% |
| 2012 | 231 | −2.11% |
| 2017 | 211 | −1.79% |
| 2023 | 212 | +0.08% |
Source: INSEE

== Sights ==
- The church of St. Martin, rebuilt in the 20th century, along with most of the village.

== See also ==
- Communes of the Pas-de-Calais department
