= Cagnicourt =

- Commune
- The main road of Cagnicourt

- Coat of arms
- Location of Cagnicourt
- Location within France Location within Hauts-de-France
- Coordinates: 50°12′46″N 2°59′52″E
- Country: France
- Region: Hauts-de-France
- Department: Pas-de-Calais
- Arrondissement: Arras
- Canton: Brebières
- Intercommunality: CC Osartis Marquion

Government
  - Mayor (2020–2026): Thibaut Samier
- Area^{1}: 9.42 km^{2} (3.64 sq mi)
- Elevation: 70 m (230 ft)
- Highest elevation: 94 m (308 ft)
- Lowest elevation: 54 m (177 ft)
- Population (2023): 421
  - Density: 44.7/km^{2} (116/sq mi)
- Time zone: UTC+01:00 (CET)
  - Summer (DST): UTC+02:00 (CEST)
- INSEE/Postal code: 62192 /62182
- ^{1} French Land Register data, which excludes lakes, ponds, glaciers > 1 km^{2} (0.386 sq mi or 247 acres) and river estuaries.

Cagnicourt (French pronunciation: [kaɲikuʁ]) is a commune in the Pas-de-Calais département in the Hauts-de-France region of France southeast of Arras.

== Population ==
Historical population
Year	Pop.	±% p.a.
1968	429	—
1975	407	−0.75%
1982	408	+0.04%
1990	394	−0.44%
1999	386	−0.23%
2007	412	+0.82%
2012	431	+0.91%
2017	432	+0.05%
2023	421	−0.43%
Source: INSEE

== See also ==
Communes of the Pas-de-Calais department
