= 38th (Welsh) Heavy Battery, Royal Garrison Artillery =

38th (Welsh) Heavy Battery, RGA
- Royal Artillery cap badge
- Active: 1915–16 April 1920
- Country: United Kingdom
- Branch: New Army
- Role: Heavy Artillery
- Size: Battery
- Part of: Royal Garrison Artillery
- Patron: Welsh National Executive Committee
- Engagements: Battle of the Ancre; Battle of Arras; Third Battle of Ypres; Battle of Cambrai; German Spring Offensive; Battle of Albert; Battle of the Canal du Nord; Second Battle of Cambrai; Battle of the Selle; Battle of the Sambre

38th (Welsh) Heavy Battery, Royal Garrison Artillery, (38th (W) Hvy Bty, RGA) was a New Army ('Kitchener's Army') unit of the British Army raised in Wales during World War I, originally as part of 38th (Welsh) Division. The battery served with the British Expeditionary Force (BEF) on the Western Front from early 1916, including the Arras, Ypres and Cambrai offensives of 1917. It fought against the German Spring Offensive and took part in the Allies' victorious Hundred Days Offensive, often supporting the Guards Division. After the Armistice with Germany it was part of the British Army of the Rhine until its disbandment in 1920.

== Recruitment and training ==
Alfred Leete's recruitment poster for Kitchener's Army.

On 6 August 1914, less than 48 hours after Britain's declaration of war, Parliament sanctioned an increase of 500,000 men for the Regular British Army, and the newly appointed secretary of state for sar, Earl Kitchener of Khartoum, issued his famous call to arms: 'Your King and Country Need You', urging the first 100,000 volunteers to come forward. This group of six divisions with supporting arms became known as Kitchener's First New Army, or 'K1'.

The flood of volunteers overwhelmed the ability of the army to absorb and organise them, and by the time the Fifth New Army (K5) was raised, many of the units were being organised as 'Pals battalions' under the auspices of local recruiting committees up and down the country. One of the largest of these was the 'Welsh National Executive Committee' (WNEC) formed after a meeting held at Cardiff under the chairmanship of David Lloyd George on 28 September. The WNEC proposed to raise a complete Welsh Army Corps of two divisions. This proposal was authorised by the WO on 10 October, and recruitment got under way. As well as the infantry Pals battalions raised by these initiatives, the K5 divisions required supporting arms such as artillery and engineers. The first artillery battery for the 1st Welsh Division was formed at Sophia Gardens at Cardiff towards the end of October. It was then sent with the other artillery recruits to the training camp at Porthcawl where they were organised into subsections. There were no uniforms before the WNEC obtained clothing in the grey Welsh cloth known as Brethyn Llwyd, which was worn until sufficient khaki could be obtained. There was a complete lack of equipment with which to train, and gun drill had to be carried out with improvisations such as a pair of old horse-drawn omnibus wheels fitted with a pole and hook to practise limbering-up. 1st Welsh Division was numbered as 43rd Division on 10 December 1914. During March and April 1915 the recruits and sections of 43rd Divisional Artillery were organised to complete the required establishment of 16 batteries (4 brigades) of the Royal Field Artillery (RFA) and 1 heavy battery of the Royal Garrison Artillery (RGA). The short-lived 43rd Division was renumbered 38th (Welsh) Division on 27 April, when the embryo heavy battery became 38th (Welsh) Heavy Battery, RGA.

However, current policy on the Western Front was to detach single heavy batteries from the infantry divisions and group them into RGA brigades of 3–4 batteries, and this organisation was adopted for the new units being formed in the UK. 38th (W) Heavy Bty with its own ammunition column was detached from 38th (W) Division before June 1915. The battery may have been at Charlton Park, near Woolwich, at the end of January 1916, possibly while receiving its equipment of four 60-pounder guns. When it completed its training it joined 120th and 129th (Bristol) Hvy Btys to form a new 42nd Heavy Brigade, RGA, at Bordon Camp on 2 March 1916. The brigade was mobilised for overseas service on 8 March and it embarked at Southampton Docks on 27 March to join the British Expeditionary Force on the Western Front. It landed at Le Havre in France on 30 March.

== Service ==
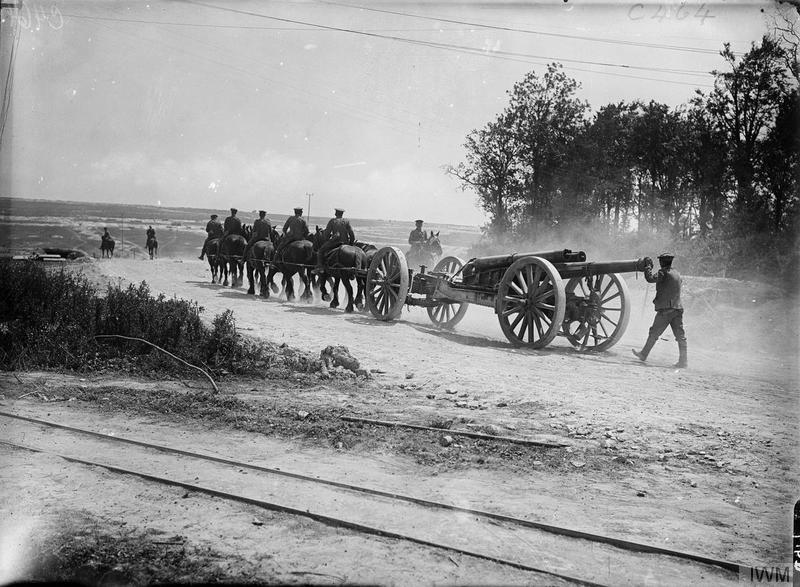
A 60-pounder moving up, 1916

As soon as the brigade arrived, artillery policy was changed again, and during April the RGA brigades were redesignated as Heavy Artillery Groups (HAGs), without change of numeral. HAGs had a more fluid organisation, and batteries were frequently switched between them. The long range 60-pdr batteries in the HAGs were primarily used for counter-battery (CB) fire. During April 38th (W) Heavy Bty moved to 28th HAG, which was being reorganised as a large group of both heavy and siege batteries for CB work. On 3 May, for example, the group's 35th Heavy Bty came under fire from German 5.9-inch guns, and 38th (W) and 2nd London Hvy Btys retaliated with a few rounds of Shrapnel shell or Lyddite high explosive (HE) on all identified '5–9' batteries in the area. 38th (W) Heavy Bty returned to 42nd HAG on 28 May until 53rd HAG arrived at Beuvry from the UK and took over command of 38th (W) Bty's four 60-pdrs and two of 2nd London Hvy Bty's old 4.7-inch guns on 28 July. 38th (W) Heavy Bty continued its almost daily CB shoots during the summer.

=== Ancre ===
So far 38th (W) Hvy Bty had only served with groups under First Army, which held the quiet sector from Laventie to Vimy Ridge while the Battle of the Somme was being fought further south. However, on 3 October 38th (W) Hvy Bty transferred south to Pommier in Third Army, first under 47th HAG, then 35th HAG took over from 18 October. The battery was now in VII Corps' sector, ready to reopen Third Army's participation in the Somme offensive, but nothing came of these plans.

38th (W) Heavy Bty continued occasional CB shoots. On 20 October it fired 34 rounds directed by a balloon observer against a German anti-aircraft (AA) battery, and two days later 30 rounds at another AA battery. However, the intensity of firing increased on 11 November when 35th HAG was ordered to cooperate with Fifth Army, which was preparing to launch the final phase of the offensive (the Battle of the Ancre). This brought down German fire on Pommier and other British positions, to which 38th (W) Hvy Bty replied. Firing continued until Zero at 06.00 on 14 November, when Fifth Army attacked. During the day 38th (W) Hvy Bty fired at targets ordered by 39th HAG. The final attack of the offensive came on 18 November when 35th HAG cooperated again. V Corps of Fifth Army succeeded in taking Beaumont-Hamel and Beaucourt, which had resisted capture on 1 July.

=== Arras ===
At the end of November Third Army reorganised its heavy artillery. Both 38th (W) Hvy Bty and 35th HAG HQ were ordered north to join VI Corps in front of Arras. The battery left Saulty on 1 December and marched by way of Habarcq to Anzin-Saint-Aubin, where it joined 48th HAG. The battery was in good positions above the watermill east of the village, with water for the horses, good dugouts along the road and good billets in the village. Following a policy decision made in the summer, 60-pdr batteries were being increased from four to six guns, and 38th Hvy Bty must have received its additional guns by now, because it deployed behind three hedges, one two-gun section behind each. The only drawback to the position was that the arc of fire was spoiled by trees. After improving and camouflaging its positions and dumping a supply of ammunition, the battery commenced CB fire on 5 December at a German 150 mm battery that had been detected near Feuchy by 3rd Field Survey Company's sound ranging. Over the following days 38th (W) Hvy Bty continued CB work, with aircraft observation when the winter weather permitted, or on predetermined 'night lines'. A few shots for registration, or on a target of opportunity such as an enemy working party, were fired on most days. On 29/30 December the battery moved forward to prepared temporary positions and took part in a special night shoot with a number of other batteries, firing simultaneous salvoes on targets deep behind enemy lines, though the salvoes were ragged. On 6 January the battery fired a large number of rounds against various targets in retaliation for the enemy's gas shelling of Arras. The battery remained here for over four months, though its command changed to 65th HAG when VI Corps heavy artillery was reorganised on 18 February 1917. 32nd HAG arrived on 25 March and took over the battery.

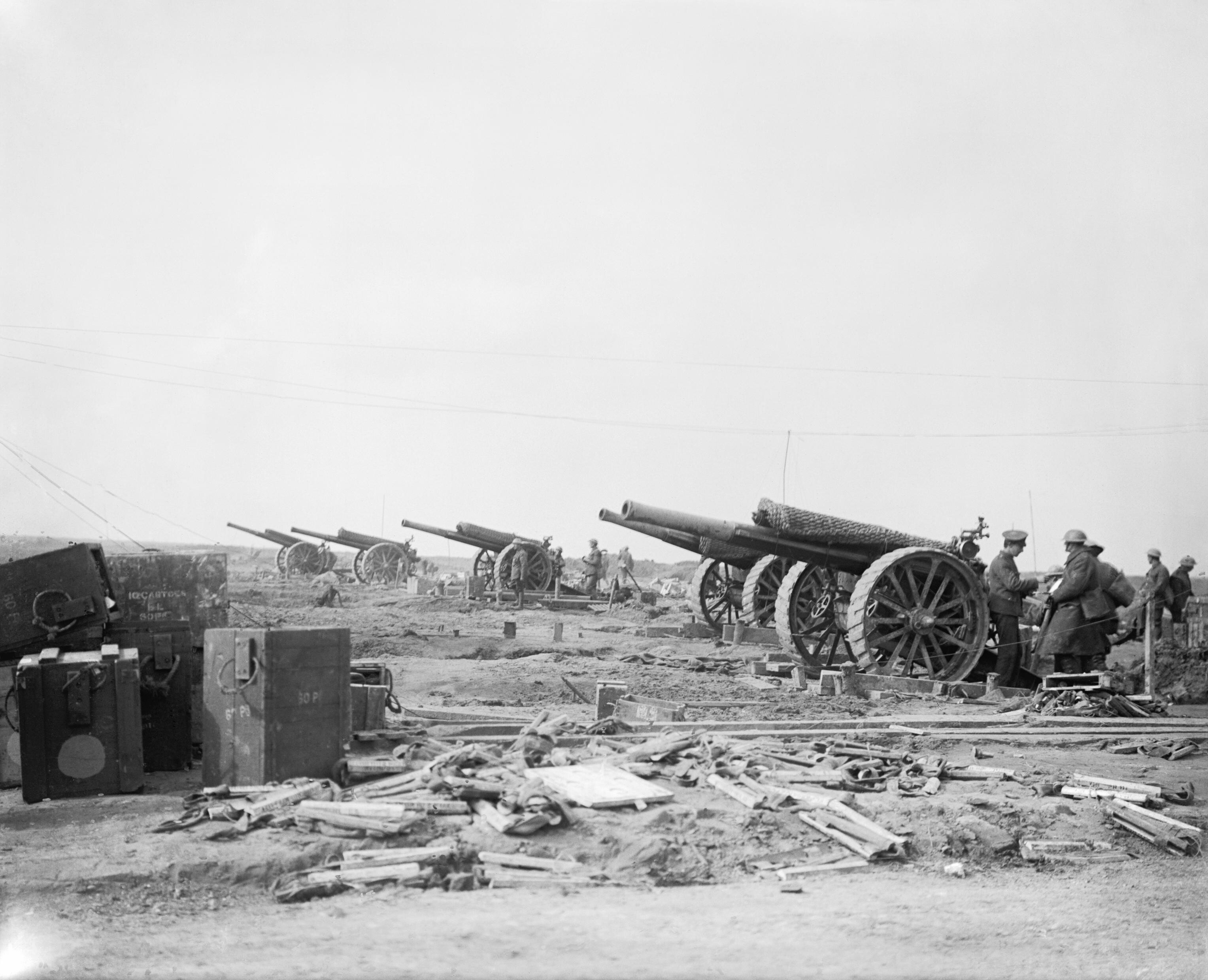
A battery of 60-pdrs in action after moving up to Feuchy during the Battle of Arras.

In late March the intensity of shelling increased as Third Army prepared for its Arras Offensive. The CB programme was highly effective, many German batteries being put out of action even before the main bombardment began. This was to be of four days' duration (V, W, X and Y), with the 60-pdrs shelling billets, tramways and light railways, and 'sweeping' communication trenches and dead ground. At night they kept up harassing fire. The heavy batteries were allocated 100 rounds per gun per day. Z Day for the attack was delayed by 24 hours, giving an additional day (Q) of bombardment. The attack was then launched on 9 April, behind a massive barrage of field guns and howitzers, while the 60-pdr batteries swept and 'searched' behind enemy lines to catch machine gunners and moving infantry as well as continuing the CB fire. With this amount of preparation the first day at Arras (the First Battle of the Scarpe) was notably successful, but subsequent phases of the offensive were increasingly costly. However, VI Corps did achieve some advances on 10 April and that afternoon 38th (W) Hvy Bty was switched to the command of 47th HAG supporting Cavalry Corps. Together with 35th Hvy Bty it moved up to a position between Tilloy and Feuchy, beside the Cambrai road. This area was known as 'Battery Valley' because so many German batteries had been located there. These were now replaced by British heavy and siege batteries moving up to shorten the range, which were established among the derelict German guns. However, the German batteries that had evacuated now had to be painstakingly re-located and registered. 35th and 38th (W) Hvy Btys engaged positions north of Rœux and east of Monchy-le-Preux which were attacked on 11 April. There was no gap for the Cavalry Corps to exploit, so 47th HAG returned to VI Corps' command that evening. 38th (W) Hvy Bty continued firing as VI Corps attempted to capture Guémappe and the Wancourt ridge, and on 14 April took part in a defensive barrage to stop a German counter-attack on Monchy. The British offensive was resumed on 23 April (the Second Battle of the Scarpe) and 47th HAG's heavy batteries had some fleeting opportunities to fire on enemy parties near Guémappe, the forward observation officers (FOOs) reporting severe losses inflicted on the enemy (confirmed by prisoners' statements). On 25 April 38th (W) Hvy Bty moved to new positions north-west of Wancourt.

On 11 May 38th (W) Hvy Bty was taken out of the line for a short rest, and on 15 May it was transferred back to 48th HAG, which was moving to Mercatel on loan to VII Corps. The Arras Offensive was winding down, but VII Corps began a series of small operations against the German Hindenburg Line on 20 May. 38th (W) Heavy Bty took part in a special bombardment ('V concentration') repeated several times during the day to neutralise enemy batteries. 33rd Division succeeded in taking the Hindenburg front line, and the attack was renewed in the evening with partial success against the support line. Next day the group fired in support of an attack further south by V Corps. Over the following weeks the batter maintained the usual routine of CB neutralisation shoots, opportunity shoots against enemy parties seen by FOOs, occasional 'V concentrations' to support infantry operations, and harassing shoots on night lines. On 29 May all of 48th HAG's batteries pulled out as the group returned to VI Corps at Tilloy.

38th (W) Heavy Bty returned to the command of 47th HAG on 24 June, and then on 30 June it briefly came under 'W Group' in XVII Corps' Artillery. From 4 July the battery was assigned to 92nd HAG, which had just been ordered north to reinforce Fifth Army for the forthcoming Third Ypres Offensive.

=== Ypres ===
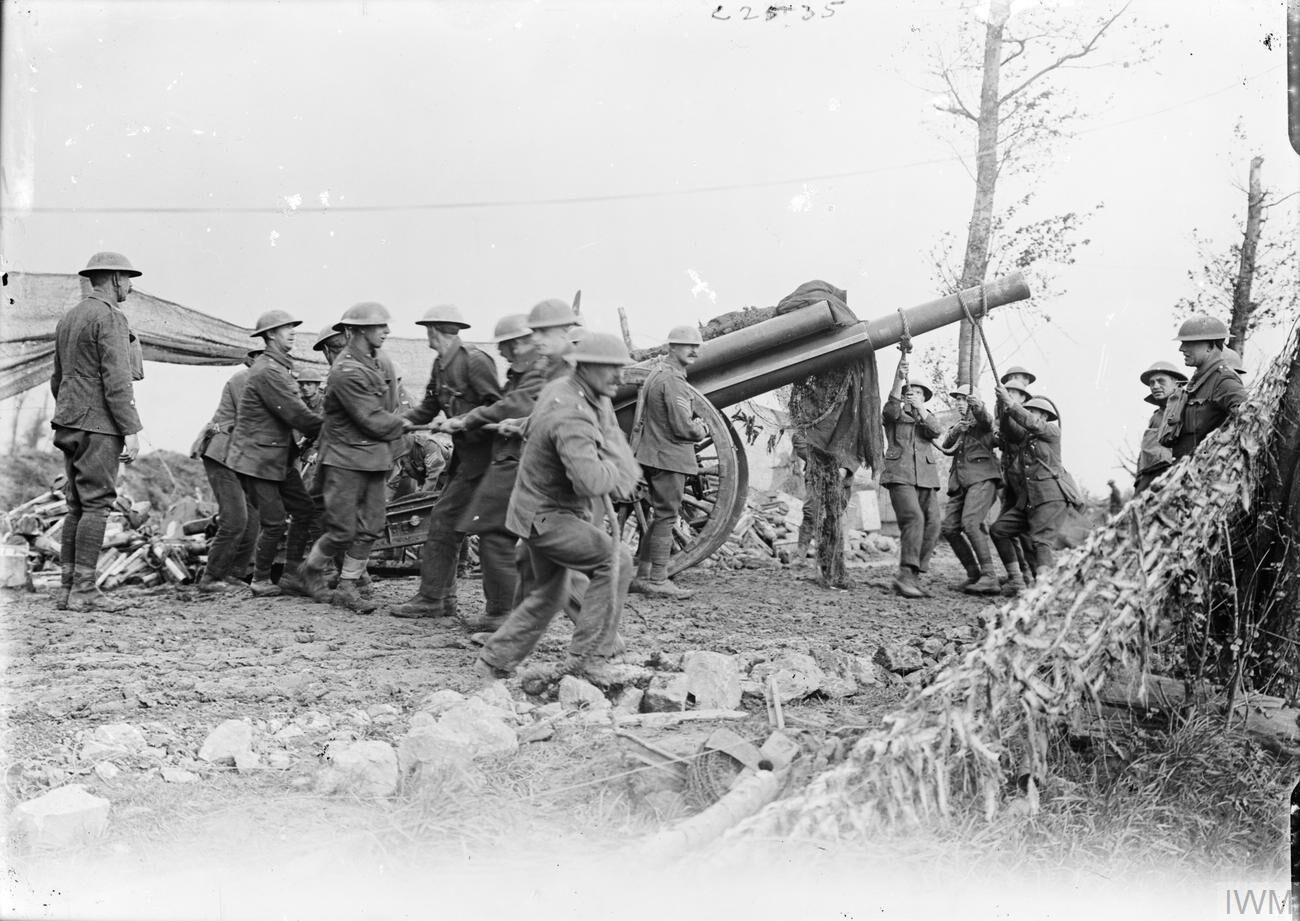
Moving a 60-pounder gun out of its emplacement, 1917.

Fifth Army was preparing for the offensive with a huge artillery concentration. 92nd HAG shared its headquarters at Poperinge with 85th HAG; they were organised as 'V Group' (siege batteries of howitzers) under 85th HAG and 'W Group' (60-pdr heavy batteries including 38th (W) Hvy Bty) under 92nd HAG. 92nd HAG/W Group was detailed as Right, or Southern, Counter Battery (Gun) Group. Firing had been going on since 12 June, but 92nd HAG was ordered to stay silent until the full bombardment began on 15 July. As well as numerous neutralising CB shoots, some called down by observation aircraft of C Flight, No 9 Squadron, Royal Flying Corps, the 60-pdrs also shelled the crossings of the Steenbeek stream, the main Torhout railway, and various tracks, roads and crossings with shrapnel. After a week's delay Zero hour for the first phase of the offensive (the Battle of Pilckem Ridge) was set for 03.50 on 31 July. The night before, 92nd HAG's batteries fired gas shells into five known German battery positions until 5 minutes before Zero. During the advance the 60-pdr batteries fired barrages behind the German second line to smash up counter-attacks and long-range machine gun positions. XIV Corps' attack in front of 92nd HAG was successful, despite heavy casualties, with Guards and 38th (Welsh) Divisions advancing from their positions along the Yser Canal, pushing through Pilckem to their third objective and taking up a line along the Steenbeek. However, the attacks further south had been less successful, and during the afternoon heavy rain set in, flooding the Steenbeek.

Next day, 1 August, 38th (W) Hvy Bde was placed 'out of action' and prepared to move forward. However, three of its guns were worn out and condemned by the Inspector of Ordnance Machinery (IOM), while the mud made movement difficult. It finally went forward to 'Wagon Farm' on 4 August, but found it very difficult to move into the position, taking 24 hours to emplace its three remaining guns. Having dug gun pits, the battery opened fire again on 6 August, aiming to neutralise enemy batteries and interrupt communications, but another gun was condemned on 9 August. The battery's observation post (OP) was at 'Stray Farm'. On 15 August the IOM reported three fresh guns ready for collection and the battery got the first of these into position at Wagon Farm at 03.15 the following morning. The replacement gun was ready to open fire at 04.50, five minutes late for Zero hour of XIV Corps' next attack. This was the Battle of Langemarck, when the infantry of 20th (Light) and 29th Divisions pushed out of the Steenbeek Valley to capture Langemarck itself. Theirs was an isolated success on an otherwise unsuccessful day. 38th (W) Heavy Bty was heavily engaged with its available guns: the second replacement was in action at 06.00 but another gun was put out of action by its recoil springs breaking. The battery sent its FOO up to Langemarck, but he could not find a decent OP and returned to Stray Farm, having suffered several casualties among his team. However, XIV Corps' success allowed 92nd HAG to move its batteries across the Yser Canal. 38th (W) Heavy Bty sent its reconnaissance party forward early next morning with material to repair roads and construct gun platforms at Huddlestone Crossroads, and the guns went up at one-hour intervals, suffering a few casualties to men and horses on the road. The battery got four guns in action by 18.00 and brought up ammunition from its old position throughout the night. Over the next three days the crossroads was shelled by German 150 mm howitzers at irregular intervals, particularly on the night of 19/20 August when two guns had their camouflage set alight and a considerable quantity of ammunition was destroyed. The battery was ordered to shift 400 yards (370 m) south to a new position. This was 150 yards (140 m) from the nearest road, and it took all day to prepare a gun road to the new position due to the enormous number of shellholes that needed to be filled in. One gun was ditched during the move on 20/21 August and it had to be left during daylight, to be recovered later, but two guns were in position by dawn. Another with a broken trail, was sent to the IOM, but five guns were positioned by dawn on 23 August. The exhausted gunners were relieved by 50 drivers brought up from the wagon lines, who worked to bring forward the ammunition. All the battery's frontline personnel were sent to a rest camp on 24 August, returning on 28 August and therefore missing the failed attack of 27 August. While they were away, men from the wagon lines succeeded in getting the last gun into position. 38th (W) Heavvy Bty resumed neutralisation fire on the night of 29/30 August.

Poor weather prevented much air observation, and the BEF's ammunition expenditure during the August battles had been so great that firing had to be limited until fresh supplies were brought up. The weather improved in September, and 92nd HAG's batteries received more 'Zone Calls' from air observers on targets of opportunity. Conversely, German day and night bombers persistently attacked Fifth Army's rear area, and the wagon lines of 92nd HAG's batteries suffered badly. The offensive was renewed on 20 September with the Battle of the Menin Road Ridge. The new tactics emphasised stepwise attacks, allowing time for the heavy artillery to carry out CB tasks and to destroy concrete emplacements before the next attack. 92nd HAG participated in a practice barrage the day before the Menin Road attack, and then in a barrage and neutralising CB fire during the actual attack, in which XIV Corps played a minor role. XIV Corps was not directly involved in the next advance (the Battle of Polygon Wood, 26 September) but 92nd HAG supported the neighbouring XVIII Corps with CB fire.

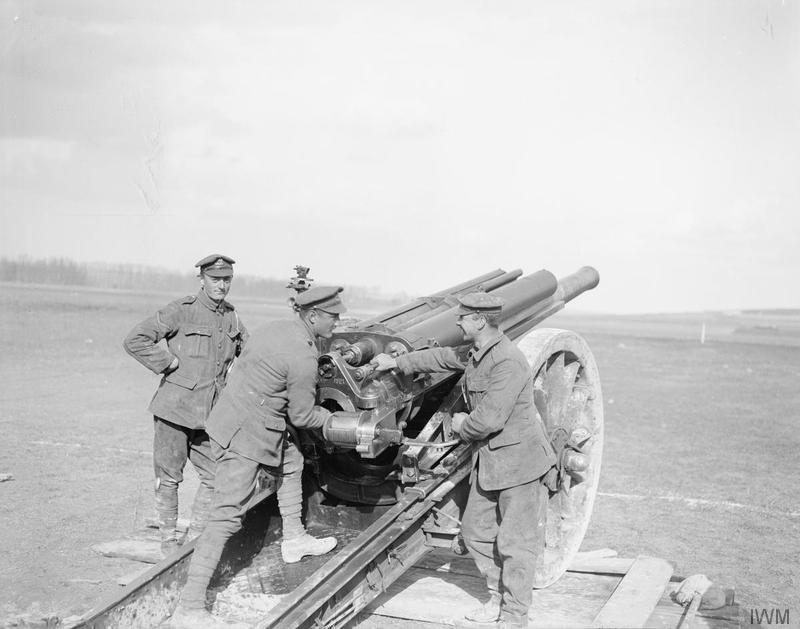
Loading a 60-pounder.

=== Cambrai ===
On 30 September 38th (W) Hvy Bty was ordered to transfer to 39th HAG in Third Army. The battery joined it at Mercatel south of Arras on 5 October, taking over the guns and positions of 2/1st Lowland (City of Edinburgh) Hvy Bty, which had exchanged into 92nd HAG. The battery's first duty was to fire in support of a simulated attack by 16th (Irish) Division on 6 October, the guns of 38th (W) Hvy Bty sweeping 'Ceylon Trench'. For the rest of the month it fired at enemy working parties and transport in support of XVII Corps.

Third Army was planning a new offensive (the Battle of Cambrai) which would not involve XVII Corps, so a number of 60-pdr batteries were transferred to the attacking corps: two sections of 38th (W) Hvy Bty left for IV Corps' area on 3 November. The remaining section continued 'sniping' at enemy movements and working parties on XVII Corps' front. The two transferred sections joined 54th HAG on 16 November, when the artillery reinforcements were moving into concealed positions.Third Army planned to send a mobile HAG comprising one 60-pdr heavy battery and one 6-inch howitzer siege battery forward with each attacking infantry division. 54th HAG temporarily consisted of 39th (W) Hvy Bty and 303rd Siege Bty and was ordered to prepare to move forward with 51st (Highland) Division.

For this operation Third Army was employing new artillery methods. To ensure surprise there was no preliminary bombardment, nor pre-registration of guns, but their targets had been accurately surveyed. The guns had all been calibrated, and batteries were equipped with guns that had identical characteristics and would fire together. The CB batteries would not attempt to destroy enemy batteries, but only to neutralise them. While 303rd Siege Bty was given barrage tasks for the first hours of the attack, 38th (W) Hvy Bty was given a 'special task' (the nature of which is unknown today). At Zero hour on 20 November, the 60-pdrs opened with gas shell, and then switched to hitting known German reserve areas while the 6-inch guns continued CB fire. On III Corps' front the infantry assault, led by hundreds of tanks, was a stunning success, but for IV Corps the picture was less good. As soon as the neutralising fire lifted off the German field batteries, they manned their guns, pulled them out of their pits and engaged the British tanks as they crossed the Flesquières ridge, destroying a number. As a result, despite starting well, 51st (H) Division became badly held up. Although 51st (H) Divisional Artillery's field batteries did move forward on 20 November, any plans to send the mobile HAG forward for the exploitation phase had to be abandoned.

Over the following days IV Corps became involved in bitter fighting in the villages and woods. On 27 November a hastily organised attack was made by Guards Division on Bourlon village and Fontaine-Notre-Dame. Although the divisional field artillery was reinforced, its only heavy artillery support was 54th HAG with 38th (W) Hvy Bty and 303rd Siege Bty, which had no time to register their targets. Although the divisional commander had asked for the heaviest possible bombardment, Bourlon was left untouched because it was thought that survivors of earlier attacks might be sheltering there. The 60-pdrs of 38th (W) Hvy Bty were directed to fire instead on the road approaches to the German positions. With its feeble artillery support, the attack of 27 November was a failure resulting in heavy casualties for the Guards.

The Germans launched a massive counter-attack on 30 November against the salient that Third Army had driven into the Hindenburg Line. IV Corps' position was relatively strong, and its heavy batteries firing from positions around Demicourt, Louverval and Beaumetz were able to cover the whole corps front in enfilade. When the German bombardment began at dawn the British heavy batteries responded with CB fire, and the waves of attackers coming over open ground between Bourlon and Mœuvres suffered a terrible pounding from everything from field guns to heavy howitzers. They made little progress in this sector. IV Corps prepared a second defence line and gathered a mobile reserve, but plans to withdraw the heavy artillery were not carried out. However, further south VII Corps' front was broken and heavy and siege batteries in the rear areas were overrun. Next day IV Corps HQ was replaced by V Corps HQ. Most of its front was quiet, but on the morning of 2 December V Corps' heavy artillery opened fire on a concentration of enemy troops observed between Bourlon Wood and the Canal du Nord. That evening the corps' front was attacked but most of the lost ground was immediately recovered. However, the renewed German advance further south on 3 December rendered the whole salient vulnerable and plans were drawn up for a retirement to a more defensible line. An enemy concentration near Mœuvres was broken up by artillery fire on the afternoon of 4 December, but there was little other German activity in front of V Corps, which was able to move its artillery batteries back during the night. Single guns or sections of heavy batteries stayed in place until just before dawn, keeping up the usual volume of fire during the night. Ammunition stocks and even empty shall cases were withdrawn before the positions were abandoned. The enemy continued bombarding the empty positions during 5 December. The infantry fell back from their covering positions to the new line of resistance that night, and by 7 December the whole of Third Army was in the positions it would hold during the winter.

=== Winter 1917–18 ===
38th (W) Heavy Bty joined 63rd HAG under XVII Corps at Athies near Arras on 29 December, and established its guns at Feuchy. The battery remained with this group for the rest of the war. By now HAG allocations were becoming more fixed, and during December 1917 they were converted into permanent RGA brigades once more. 63rd HAG became 63rd (Mobile) Bde, with 38th (W) and 119th Heavy Btys (60-pdrs) and two siege batteries (6-inch howitzers), serving under Third Army.

There was little activity during January and February 1918, 38th (W) Hvy Bty occasionally firing to disperse enemy working parties or for CB shoots, otherwise to check lines and calibrate its guns. The men spent much of the time building alternative and rear gun positions in case of an enemy offensive. A thaw set in in mid-January, and the battery's badly designed dugouts were flooded, creating more discomfort and work for the men. On 25 January the Germans carried out a shoot on Feuchy with gas and HE, the first rounds landing on the battery's lead section, causing a number of gas casualties and destroying many cartridges. Similar shoots later in the month caused no damage to the battery. 63rd Brigade moved from Athies to Tilloy Wood in February, and 38th (W) Hvy Bty took over the guns and positions of 1/1st Lowland (City of Edinburgh) Hvy Bty. The battery's personnel spent 10–16 February at XVII Corps' rest camp.

=== German Spring Offensive ===
Activity increased in the second week of March in anticipation of the Germans launching a major offensive. 38th (W) Heavy Bty fired in support of an infantry raid on 9 March, and from 12 March the heavy batteries directed harassing fire and corps salvoes against enemy communications day and night. The German spring offensive began with a tremendous bombardment against Third and Fifth Armies at 04.40 on 21 March. At 05.10 and 09.15 63rd Bde's batteries fired their planned 'Counter Preparation' barrages against likely routes of advance (observed fire was impossible until later in the day because of thick mist) but XVII Corps was not attacked. The brigade fired another CP barrage on the southern edge of Bullecourt at 13.30 to assist the neighbouring VI Corps. Then at 16.30 63rd (Mobile) Bde was one of three sent from XVII Corps to reinforce the hard-pressed VI Corps. The batteries pulled out their guns at 23.30 and during the night they marched south to Behagnies, arriving between 09.30 and 11.00 next morning and coming into action in the afternoon near Mory. Thereafter the brigade was in constant movement as the centre and right of Third Army was forced to retreat. 63rd Brigade pulled out at 00.30 on 23 March and the batteries came into action in front of Gomiécourt at 07.00, firing at the north-east part of Ervillers. On 24 March they were in action in front of Logeast Wood, then next day they pulled out at 00.20 to come into action between Monchy-au-Bois and Ransart. 38th (W) Heavy Bty remained there until 28 March, when the brigade moved to Bellacourt, south-west of Arras. On that day the last German effort against Arras had been held off (the First Battle of Arras), and the fighting on Third Army's front died down.

38th (W) Heavy Bty continued harassing fire over the following days as the Germans made a final attack on Third Army (the Battle of the Ancre (1918), 5 April) before the front solidified. On 12 April the enemy put up 17 kite balloons; 38th (W) Hvy Bty engaged one of these, but was forced to cease fire by hostile shellfire. On 11 May 63rd Bde moved to Monchiet and on 2 June to Basseux, both in the area south-west of Arras. The batteries continued the normal routines of trench warfare.

=== Hundred Days Offensive ===
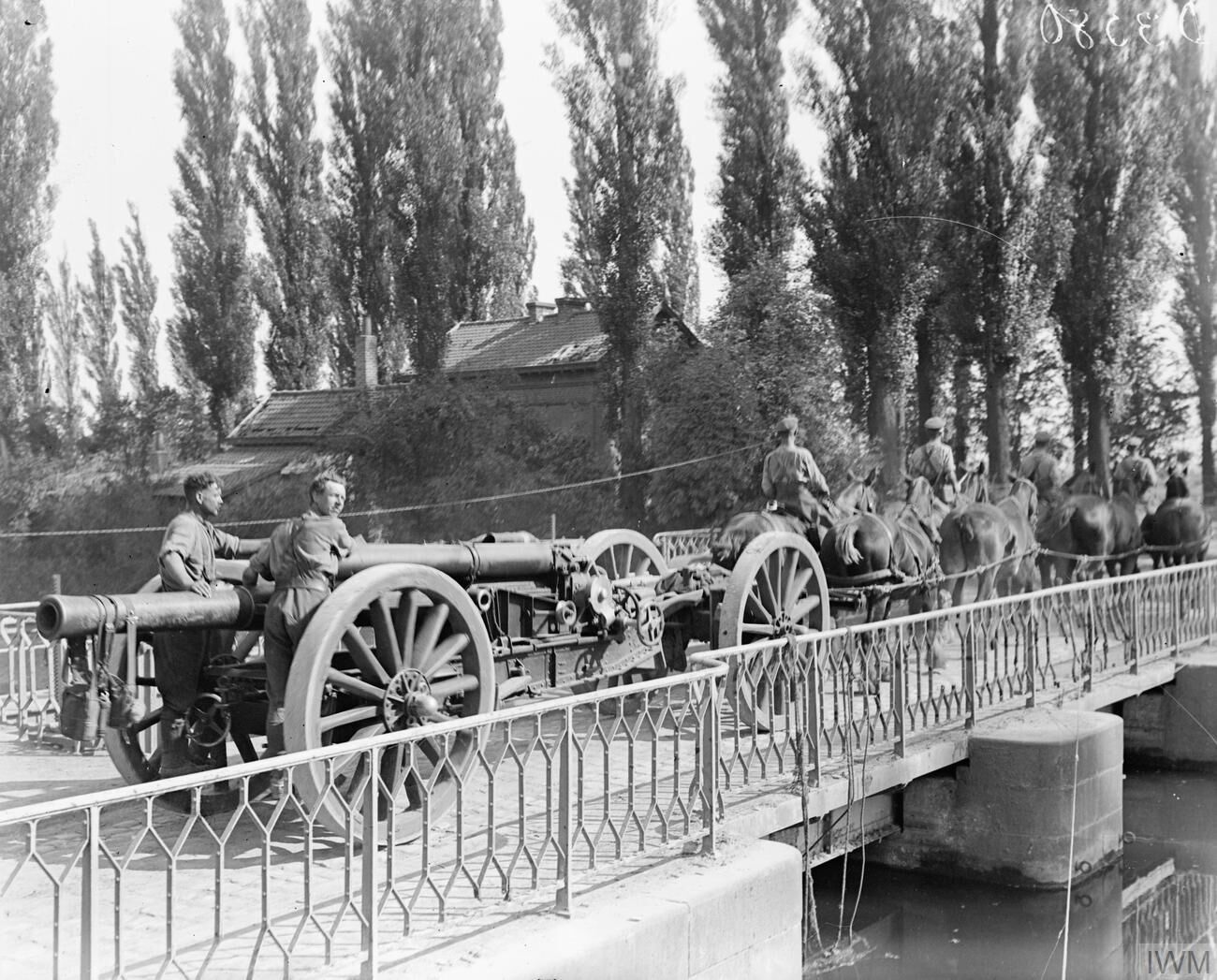
A 60-pounder advancing during the Hundred Days Offensive

The Allies launched their final Hundred Days Offensive with the Battle of Amiens on 8 August. Third Army joined in on 21 August at the Battle of Albert, when the batteries of 63rd (Mobile) Bde moved forward in support of the advancing infantry. They supported the successful attack of 56th (1st London) Division of VI Corps on 23 August and that division's less successful attack on 24 August. On that day the batteries moved to Blairville and engaged 'many' targets. They continued to advance next day, officers' patrols keeping in close touch with the infantry. They kept this up into September, using air and ground observation to identify their targets. Enemy batteries were engaged and their lines of retreat harassed. On 3 September, when brigade HQ had moved up to Lagnicourt, the batteries supported Guards Division, who made an unopposed advance towards the Canal du Nord. The Germans made a stand there, and the batteries of 63rd Bde reverted to harassing their rear areas night and day. Hostile batteries were engaged during the day and gassed at night. Unusually the 60-pdrs were also used for trench bombardment.

On 27 September the Allies began a coordinated series of offensives all along the Western Front. On that day Third Army launched the Battle of the Canal du Nord. 63rd Brigade's batteries participated in the bombardment, and later in the day they and brigade HQ crossed the canal, continuing their advance to Flesquières next day after its capture by VI Corps. On 30 September the brigade bombarded enemy trenches, and on 1 October the 60-pdrs fired shrapnel in support of the infantry advance. By 8 October the batteries had reached the St Quentin Canal and supported 2nd and 3rd Divisions in their attacks (the Second Battle of Cambrai). Guards Division then continued the pursuit to the River Selle supported by 63rd Bde until 12 October. The Selle was crossed on 20 October, and until the end of the month 63rd Bde and its batteries advanced almost daily while firing to support the infantry. On 4 November, at Cappelle, they provided CB and harassing fire for the Guards Division's attack in the Battle of the Sambre. 38th and 119th Heavy Btys then took their 60-pdrs forward to Preux-au-Sart during the night of 5/6 November. By 7 November the brigade had reached La Longueville, where the 60-pdrs engaged in harassing the enemy rear areas. Early on 9 November the Guards occupied their final objective of Maubeuge followed by the HQ of 63rd Bde while the batteries were in the suburb of Douzies. They were still there when the Armistice with Germany came into effect at 11.00 on 11 November.

== Postwar ==
On 25 November 1918 63rd (Mobile) Bde, RGA, and its batteries began a long march across liberated Belgium with VI Corps, crossing the German frontier near Gemünd to join the Allied occupation of the Rhineland, the British component of which became the British Army of the Rhine. The troops were comfortably billeted, and demobilisation of key personnel began in early 1919.

63rd (Mobile) Bde was disbanded on 1 November 1919 and 38th Bty, RGA, (it dropped the 'Heavy' designation on 19 April 1919) was redesignated as 38th Mountain Bty, RGA, on 7 January 1920. It was absorbed into the cadre of 2nd Mountain Bty, RGA, to reform that Regular Army unit on 16 April 1920.

== Memorial ==
There is a brass memorial plate to 38th Welsh Heavy Battery RGA (omitting the brackets round 'Welsh') in Cardiff City Hall. It lists 32 names of those who died, with the RA badge above, and includes in the centre an image of a Welsh goat surrounded by a wreath.
