= 301st Siege Battery, Royal Garrison Artillery =

Artillery unit of the British Army in World War I

301st Siege Battery, RGA
- Cap Badge of the Royal Regiment of Artillery
- Active: 17 November 1916–1919
- Country: United Kingdom
- Branch: British Army
- Role: Siege Artillery
- Size: Battery
- Part of: Royal Garrison Artillery
- Equipment: BL 6-inch 26 cwt howitzer
- Engagements: Battle of Messines; Third Battle of Ypres; Battle of Cambrai; German Spring Offensive; Hundred Days Offensive

Insignia
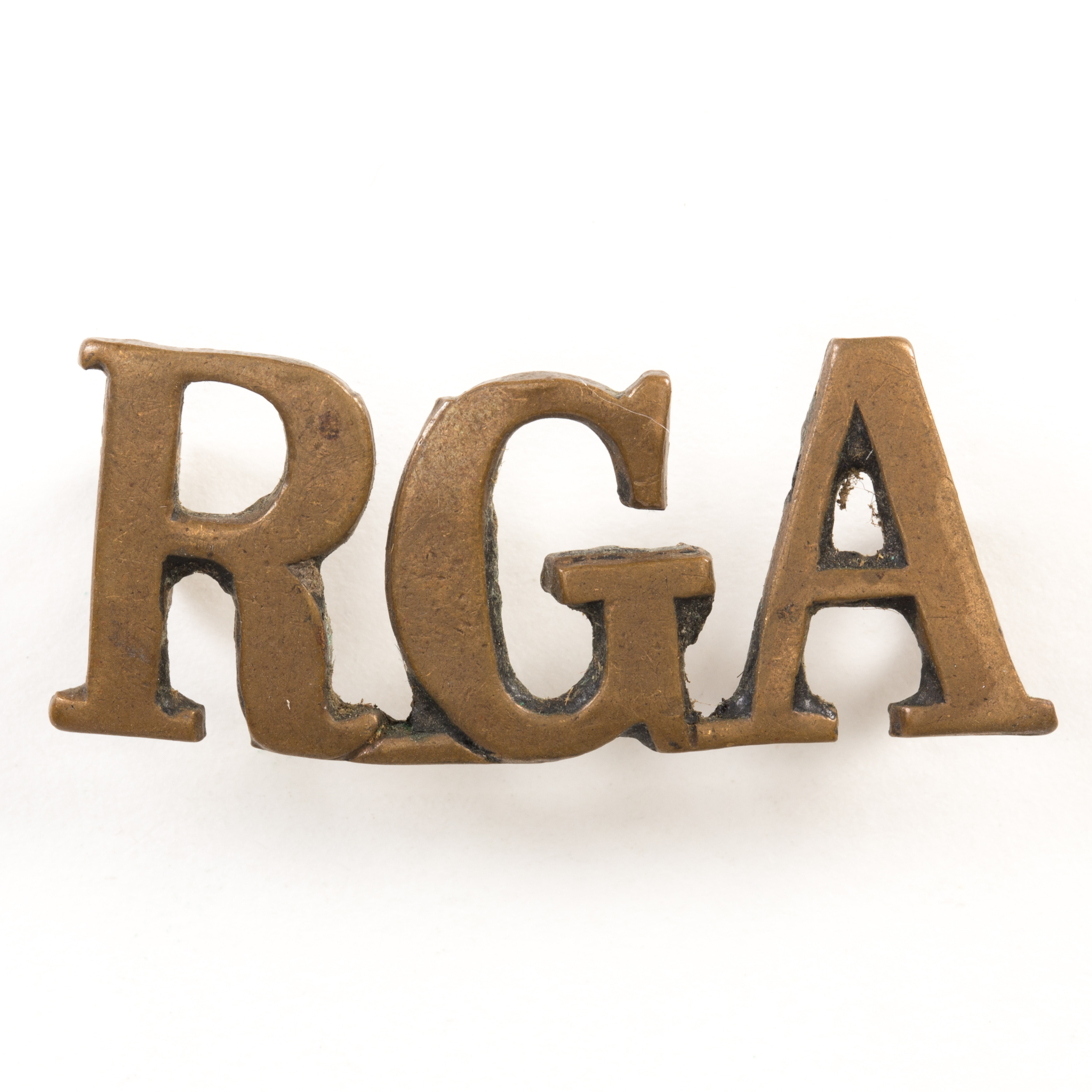
- Shoulder title

301st Siege Battery (301st SB) was a heavy howitzer unit of Britain's Royal Garrison Artillery (RGA) in World War I. Formed in November 1916, it served on the Western Front at the battles of Messines, Ypres and Cambrai, against the German Spring Offensive and in the final Allied Hundred Days Offensive. After the Armistice with Germany the battery served in the Allied occupation of the Rhineland until it was disbanded in 1919.

== Mobilisation and training ==
Once the fighting on the Western Front had bogged down into Trench warfare in 1914, there was an urgent need for siege artillery, and a large number of new RGA units were hurriedly formed over the following years. The Army Council instructed that 301st Siege Battery would be formed at Portsmouth with effect from 17 November 1916, conforming to the establishment laid down for 6-inch breechloading howitzer batteries. After training, the battery was mobilised at Larkhill on 14 March 1917 and on 18 March was equipped with four BL 6-inch 26 cwt howitzers. Together with 303rd SB it embarked for the Western Front on 2 April and landed at Le Havre in France the following morning, the guns arriving on 7 April.

== Western Front ==
The two new batteries entrained on 8 April and arrived at Bailleul next day. They then marched to join 41st Heavy Artillery Group (HAG) at Dranoutre behind the southern part of the Ypres Salient held by Second Army. While its guns were overhauled at the siege park, the gunners of 301st SB began digging gun pits and dugouts. By 19 April it had 'B' and 'D' guns in position and commenced firing next day, under the command of Captain G.W. Graham (a pre-war officer of the Cork RGA (Special Reserve).) Its first targets were the Dammstrasse and 'White Chateau', notable defensive position behind the German lines, though 41st HAG supporting IX Corps was mainly employed for counter-battery (CB) fire. 301st SB soon settled to its CB tasks, receiving some hostile fire in return and suffering its first few casualties. From 12 to 17 May the battery did no firing while its gunners worked on tramways to bring up ammunition. It then resumed its CB and trench bombardment tasks. On 20 May 301st SB was transferred to the command of 53rd HAG, which had recently arrived at Locre to join IX Corps, but the battery continued with the same tasks, firing hundreds of rounds each day on camouflaged enemy emplacements and important trenches, together with barbed wire-cutting shoots. On 27 May the front was subjected to a German cylinder gas attack, followed by gas shells on the battery positions, requiring the gunners to work in respirators for some time.

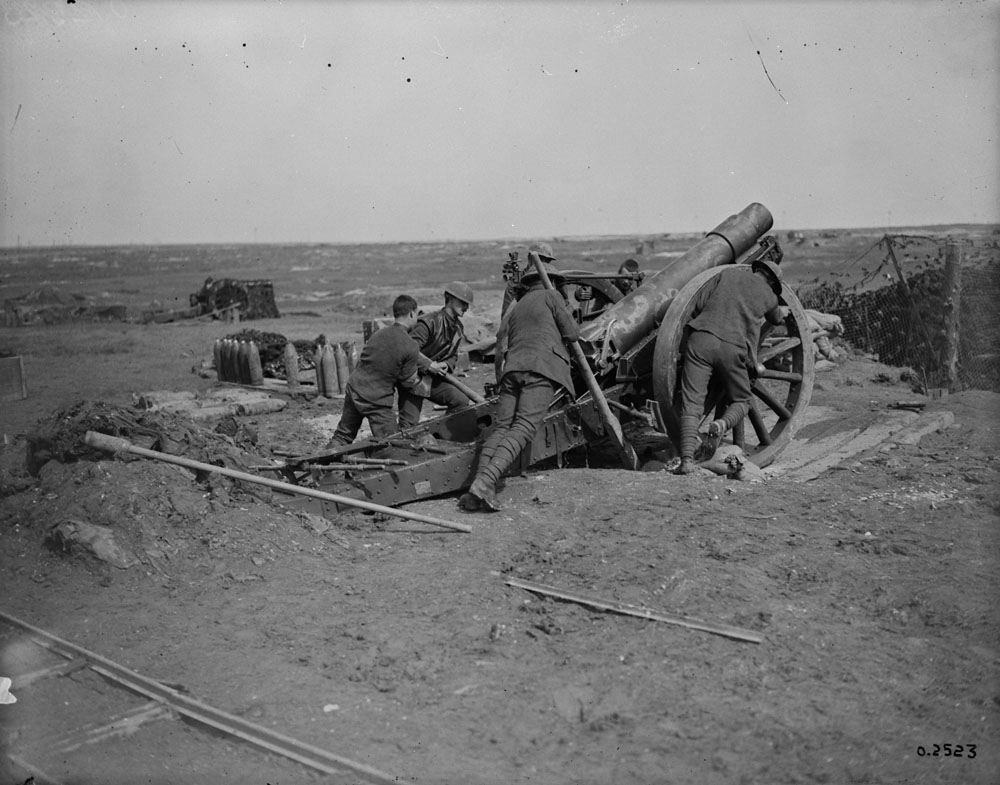
A 6-inch 26 cwt howitzer in action on the Western Front.

=== Messines ===
The arrival of 53rd HAG and other artillery units and HQs was part of a build-up for an attack that Second Army was preparing against the Messines–Wytschaete Ridge (the Battle of Messines). The preliminary bombardment for the attack began on 3 June with a special bombardment of Wytschaete village on IX Corps' front, which was expected to be strongly defended.

Second Army's artillery plan emphasised CB fire, and simulated attacks were made to induce the enemy to reveal his hidden batteries: over 200 hostile battery positions were intensively shelled during two days of concentrated CB fire prior to Z Day. British artillery fire died away about 02.40 on the morning of 7 June (Z Day). Before dawn, at 03.10, the surprise element of the plan was revealed: the simultaneous explosion of 19 huge mines dug under the ridge, which blew the German front line system to bits before the infantry went over the top. IX Corps had as its objectives the line from the Spanbroekmolen salient to the 'Nag's Nose' salient at Hollandscheschuur, including the village of Wytschaete, while X Corps was to take the ridge to the north, including the Dammstrasse and the woods beyond. The British guns opened fire immediately after the mine explosions at Zero, and 53rd HAG's batteries were soon switched to their second tasks as the infantry overran the German positions. The results of the limited attack were spectacular, with the whole ridge being captured. In the IX Corps' area, the 36th (Ulster) Division found that 'the ground about the strongpoints had been literally ploughed up by the bursts of the high explosive shells during the bombardment; the barbed wire entanglements which had protected this are below the crest lay piled in twisted heaps, and everywhere was the wreckage of once solidly built dugouts and shelters'. The Dammstrasse position was successfully captured by X Corps. During the morning the battery was ordered to cease fire and pull out and park its guns, which were now out of range.

The day after the battle the battery struck camp, loaded its lorries, and moved off to Vlamertinge behind Ypres in Fifth Army's area, where it handed two guns over to 168th and 237th SBs. After sleeping at the siege park the men went on 9 June to a rest camp at Houtkerque. While it was resting and training at Houtkerque 301st SB came briefly under the command of 88th HAG on 11 June, then transferred to 71st HAG on 13 June, then back to 53rd HAG three days later.

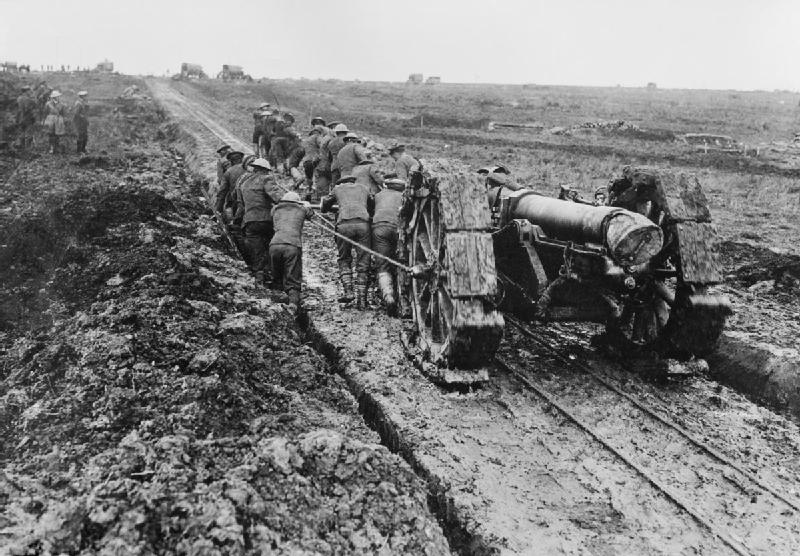
6-inch howitzer being moved through mud on the Western Front.

=== Ypres ===
Fifth Army was preparing for the Ypres Offensive, and fresh batteries were constantly arriving. XIX Corps' Heavy Artillery (HA) had just taken command of the sector directly in front of Ypres and 301st SB was assigned to D Sub-Group of 70th HAG on 24 June. On 28 June a detachment from the battery moved one howitzer close to the new assigned position, but it proved impossible to move it into position in the mud, and the other gun was sent back to the siege park. It was not until 1 July that the first gun was hauled out of the mud and into position, and the detachment suffered a number of casualties from enemy shellfire while doing so; shellfire also damaged the camouflage. By 2 July the first gun was 'in action', a second was in position, and camouflage had been erected for Nos 3 and 4. The remainder of the battery arrived from Houtkerque on 3 July and the guns began firing a few rounds 'by the map', without observation. 13th HAG arrived at Vlamertinge on 4 July and took 301st SB under its command. 13th and 70th HAGs together constituted XIX Corps HA's Northern Counter-Battery Group for the forthcoming operation.

It had been planned to increase RGA siege batteries' establishment to six guns, and on 8–9 July a section of 1 officer and 57 ORs joined 301st SB from the recently-arrived 371st SB, (Note: 371st Siege Battery, RGA, had been formed on 14 February 1917 at Prees Heath Camp, and its personnel had landed in France on 25 June before being posted to XIX Corps HA. The other section of the battery was assigned to 303rd SB.) However, these only made up for recent casualties, and no additional guns were issued to the battery at this time.

301st SB continued improving its positions, digging a communication trench from the dugouts to the gun positions, building a command post and laying a tramway to bring up ammunition, the working parties suffering a number of casualties from shellfire. Meanwhile the guns continued firing, mainly map shoots or 'SOS' shoots in response to requests from the infantry, although a few targets were registered from an observation post (OP) at 'Hussar Farm' or with aircraft observation. On 16 July the preliminary bombardment for the Ypres offensive began; on that day the battery was shelled with gas and high explosive (HE), and the gunners had to wear their respirators for four hours. This was repeated next morning and No 3 gun was put out of action by a direct hit. The bombardment proceeded, 301st SB mainly on neutralisation CB shoots, 'sweeping and searching' behind enemy lines or point targets such as Zonnebeke Church. On the night of 27 July a German aircraft bombed the battery, starting a fire that was soon extinguished.

The bombardment reached high intensity from 29 July, and the first phase of the offensive (the Battle of Pilckem Ridge) was launched at 03.50 on 31 July with a heavy barrage, 301st SB firing 760 rounds on its assigned target. The infantry went forward and by dawn (04.40) they had broken through the German outpost line and advanced about 800 yards (730 m) up the shell-pitted slope of Pilckem Ridge. At 05.05 fresh companies leapfrogged through to continue the advance against the belt of fortified farms that protected the German second line. On XIX Corps' front some of these held out for up to 3 hours, but soon after 09.00 the British infantry had gained a foothold across the Steenbeek stream. 301st SB responded to a few calls from the OPs during the afternoon. However, the advance of the reserve brigades to the third objective was badly coordinated and towards evening the Germans counter-attacked, pushing XIX Corps back to the Steenbeek and recapturing 'Wurst Farm'. During the counter-attack the enemy fired a concentration on 301st SB, killing three gunners and wounding four. That evening heavy rain set in and continued for three days, preventing air observation and turning the battlefield into a sea of mud. This made the forward movement of reinforcements, supplies, guns and ammunition extremely difficult and delayed further operations. The sickness rate also increased.

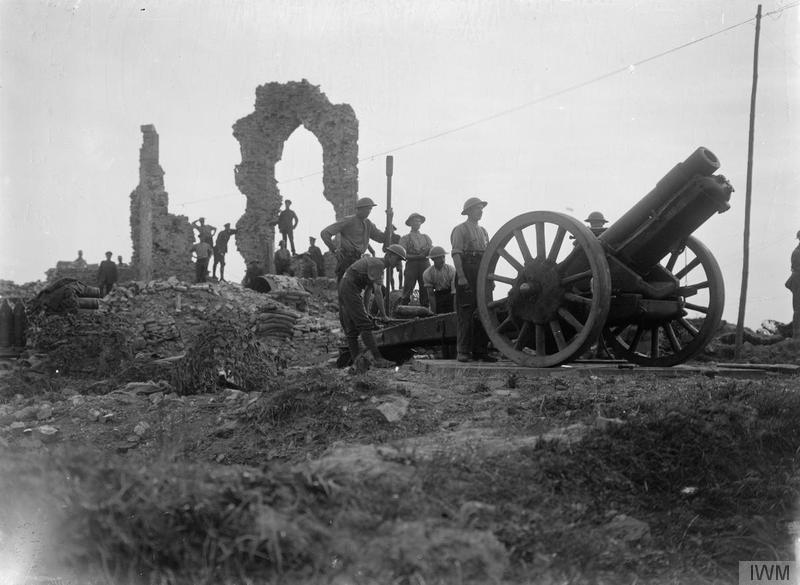
6-inch howitzer in action near Ypres, August 1917.

Over the following days 301st SB continued its 'searching and sweeping' and CB neutralisation shoots, calibrating its guns as required with shots against Zonnebeke Church. There was a steady trickle of casualties from shellfire, gas, and sickness. The offensive resumed with the Battle of Langemarck on 16 August. 301st SB fired over 650 rounds in the morning and later responded to calls from OPs and aircraft. The attack was not a success: the exhausted infantry had to wade through mud in the flooded Steenbeek valley. Many key points had not been adequately bombarded, and smoke obscured the OPs and SOS signals, so German counter-attacks were effective. XIX Corps in particular gained little ground. There was now a lull in large-scale operations as Second Army took the lead and carefully prepared for a resumption of the offensive. Fifth Army continued local attacks on the pillboxes protecting the Passchendaele Ridge. 301st SB fired hundreds of rounds a day on 'searching and sweeping' or map shoots. It received some reinforcements from the RGA Base or returned from hospital, but suffered a continual trickle of casualties. On 2 September Right Section of the battery was relieved by a section of 71st (South African) SB sent up from Third Army; the section withdrew to Poperinge for rest (though the billets were bombed).

=== Cambrai ===
On 3 September 301st SB was ordered to transfer to 55th HAG with VI Corps in Third Army. Right Section travelled south by train from Poperinge to the new sector at Hénin-sur-Cojeul on 7 September, and next day began working on the new battery positions. It fired a few ranging shots with aircraft observation on 11 September and then began routine map shooting and night firing. Left Section remained at the old battery position, suffering numerous gas casualties, until it was relieved on 15 September, and then left Poperinge on 21 September to join Right Section and relieve the other section of 71st (SA) SB. 301st SB came under the command of 17th HAG on 22 September after that group moved to Third Army in exchange for 55th HAG. The battery settled down to the trench warfare routine, with shoots on targets indicated by OPs or aircraft, and night harassing fire (HF) tasks. From early October it was firing in support of 16th (Irish) Divisional Artillery against 'Tunnel Trench', part of the Hindenburg Line support trench that had remained uncaptured since the fighting round Bullecourt earlier in the year. On 14–15 October the battery carried out a wire-cutting task for a major raid by 16th (Irish) Division on Tunnel Trench.

From 14 November 301st SB was under the command of 4th HAG, and remained with it for the rest of the war. Major Graham went to England for a command course from 17 November to 4 December. Third Army launched a surprise attack on 20 November (the Battle of Cambrai), which did not involve VI Corps' front. However, the corps arranged numerous diversions, including a simultaneous attack on Tunnel Trench by 16th (I) Division. 4th HAG fired a heavy CB neutralisation bombardment at Zero (06.20), and continued slow CB fire until 08.55 when 301st SB was directed onto selected points in the standing barrage protecting the advance of the neighbouring IV Corps. 301st SB fired over 600 rounds on various targets during the day. It continued firing over the next two days, then on the afternoon of 22 November it pulled out its guns and shifted them a few kilometres by light railway to a new position at Noreuil. They were ready for action that evening except No 1 gun, which returned by railway from the workshops next day. Over the following weeks the battery fired numerous CB tasks and a few trench bombardments, but because of the weather observation was often poor. The Germans made a major counter-attack at Cambrai on 30 November, and on 1 December they subjected the whole area round Noreuil to bombardment, to which 4th HAG's batteries responded. 301st SB was hit by enemy fire again on 14 December, and on 30–31 December the Germans made a determined effort to capture 'Welsh Ridge' defending the right flank of the Flesquières salient that remained in British hands after Cambrai. The attack was accompanied by heavy gas shelling on British batteries along the whole front.

=== Winter 1917–18 ===
Heavy Artillery Groups were now becoming permanent RGA Brigades rather than ad hoc groups. During December 4th HAG was redesignated 4th (Mixed) Brigade, with two 60-pounder heavy batteries (2/1st North Midland and 131st HBs), two 6-inch howitzer batteries (223rd and 301st SBs), one 8-inch howitzer battery (261st SB), and one 9.2-inch howitzer battery (129th SB). 301st SB remained part of this brigade for the rest of the war. In January 1918 301st SB was finally issued with two additional howitzers, bringing it up to its six-gun establishment.

Major Richards was admitted to hospital on 30 December and later granted home leave. He was struck off the strength of the battery on 30 January 1918. Enemy artillery was now mostly quiet, but 4th Bde carried out CB shoots every day, also firing on enemy working parties and night harassing fire. On the night of 24/25 February the whole of 4th Bde was withdrawn for rest. The siege battery howitzers were pulled out and parked along the main Bapaume–Arras road. On 26–28 February the brigade marched to Saulty, where it overhauled its guns and carried out training. The Allies were expecting a major German spring offensive, and at 18.00 on 5 March the brigade was recalled to the line at very short notice and marched through the night. Next day 301st SB bivouacked at Beaumetz and then went into action on 6/7 March, with one 4-gun position and one 2-gun position. Considerable movement could be seen behind enemy lines, and the batteries fired to harass this, on railways and roads, and on enemy battery areas. From 15 March heavy CB preparations were put down every night at varying times, and always just before dawn. Although a number of ammunition dumps were blown up and gun-pits observed to be hit, the Germans made no response.

=== Spring Offensive ===
At 05.10 on 21 March, while 4th Bde was still firing its pre-dawn counter-preparation, the German artillery opened a massive barrage all along the front of Third and Fifth Armies. 4th Brigade's batteries continued firing their counter-preparation tasks at SOS rates, but dense mist hindered observation while shellfire cut most telephone lines, so they could only fire on pre-arranged targets. The enemy assault was launched against VI Corps at 09.40, covered by the mist. Later, as visibility improved, some specific targets could be engaged: at 16.50 301st SB and two other batteries caught an advancing infantry column that had been spotted. By 17.00 all the batteries were firing on Bullecourt and Écoust, which had been within the Forward Zone of 59th (2nd North Midland) Division: the survivors of the garrison at Écoust had surrendered at 16.30. From Écoust the enemy had worked round the right flank of 34th Division, while further south the flanks of the Flesquières salient had been rapidly penetrated. Firing died away as darkness fell, with 34th Division still holding its Battle Zone between Croisilles and Saint-Léger, but the Germans having gained a huge pocket between 34th and 59th Divisions. 301st SB had lost one gun destroyed by shellfire during the day, together with 1 officer and 3 ORs killed and 18 ORs wounded. During the night VI Corps abandoned Croisilles to hold a stronger line on higher ground behind and replaced 59th (2nd NM) Division with 40th Division from reserve. Next morning 4th Bde's batteries began 'searching' fire into the mist, then at 10.40 they concentrated on Croisilles. By midday reinforcements were arriving, including 84th Bde RGA, which joined 4th Bde to form a double group. About 14.30 the enemy massed in front of VI Corps, and the heavy artillery began firing their SOS tasks as an attack came in on Saint-Léger Wood. By 17.30 the weight of these numbers on the exhausted British divisions, and pressure from the right where IV Corps had given way, meant that the line was bent back and Hénin Hill had been lost. 34th Division withdrew to the rear trenches of the Battle Zone. Once again, firing ceased after dark, with 4th Bde later harassing the enemy's roads.

Next morning (23 March) 4th Bde responded to SOS calls from the infantry. 301st SB fired on 'The Sucerie', on Hally Copse near Saint-Léger, and on Mory, where fierce fighting was taking place as 40th Division counter-attacked the village. The rest of VI Corps' front was shelled but no attack was made on it during the day. On the night of 23/24 March 31st Division came into the line to relieve 34th Division, and 4th Bde was affiliated to directly to Guards Division to the left of 31st Division. Throughout 24 March the batteries fired SOS and HF tasks (84th Bde was replaced by 88th Bde during the day) as the Germans continued to attack at Mory. VI Corps fought hard to maintain its positions during 25 March, but the continued retreat of the troops to its right forced it to give ground and swing back. 4th Brigade's most advanced batteries were withdrawn some distance, but all batteries fired on Gomiécourt that evening after its capture by the enemy. At 23.10 on 25 March 301st SB was ordered to pull out its guns (it had obtained a replacement sixth gun by now), and next day it marched to Bailleulmont. On 27 March 4th Bde marched to Ransart with its more mobile guns (the 60-pdrs and 6-inch howitzers) and came back into action, with 301st SB positioned at Adinfer. Its main targets were enemy troop concentrations observed from the OP in Adinfer, the villages of Moyenneville and Hamelincourt, and the nearby airfield. Guards Division was heavily shelled and attacked by infantry but held its ground. However, a gap was opening to its right as IV Corps continued to fall back, and Guards Division was ordered to fall back to the 'Purple Line' that was being dug between Adinfer and Hendecourt. 301st SB was therefore withdrawn from Adinfer to positions behind Ransart, but it only went back after it had fired off all its ammunition. During the night Guards Division closed the gap to IV Corps, and the Germans failed to break through on 28 March, their infantry concentrations being broken up by the British artillery. Although the German offensive continued elsewhere, 29 March was quiet on the Guards' front, and the last attack on them was repulsed next day. 4th Brigade's batteries remained active to the end of the month.

There was little firing by either side's artillery on 1–4 April, but 4th Bde noticed an upturn in enemy activity on 5 April when they made one last attack on other parts of Third Army's line. This marked the end of the first phase of the German offensive, and the emphasis moved north to the Battle of the Lys around the Ypres Salient. 4th Brigade's batteries resumed their usual CB and HF tasks, and occasionally fired on fleeting targets reported by the OPs, such as infantry columns, particularly on the Croisilles–Saint-Léger road. Each battery of 4th Bde kept one 2-gun section at a separate silent location throughout April and May. An increase in enemy fire was observed on 24–25 April, coinciding with the failed enemy attack on Villers-Bretonneux. The enemy artillery was more active in May, to which 4th Bde responded with increased CB fire. On the evening of 17 May 301st and 223rd SBs sent their rear sections forward to carry out a night bombardment of two targets, and they experimented with augmented charges to increase the range of their guns. CB shoots with aircraft observation became frequent. On 17 June 4th Bde's batteries pulled out and went to rest in the Pommera area, then on 28 June they entrained for Second Army, arriving at Arnèke and Esquelbecq next day. On 30 June they went into action under XIX Corps HA south of the Vlamertinge–Ypres road, with each section of 301st SB occupying a different position. 4th Brigade remained with Second Army for the remainder of the war.

=== Hundred Days Offensive ===
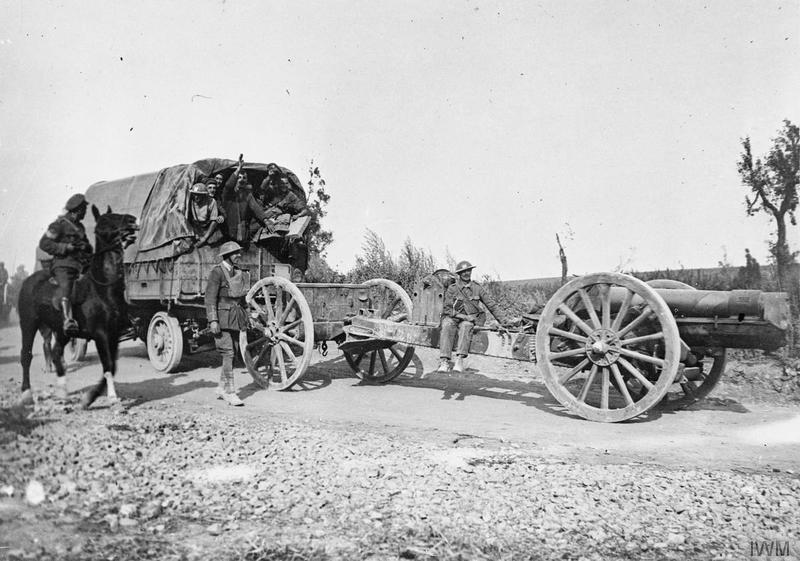
A 6-inch howitzer being towed up to the line in August 1918.

In early July 4th Bde established its OPs and liaison with 33rd Division in front, and began registering its batteries. 301st SB carried out an experimental shoot using air-burst shells for ranging, and began its routine CB work. It also suffered from hostile shelling on a number of occasions. Between 12 and 17 July batteries of the brigade combined for 'shell storm' bombardments of selected enemy batteries. On the night of 28/29 July 301st and 223rd SBs fired to support a raid by X Corps, and again early on 2, 4 and 7 August when 35th and 41st Divisions carried out raids. From 7 August 4th Bde considerably increased the number of shell-storm shoots.

On 8 August the Allies launched their counter-offensive when Fourth Army attacked at the Battle of Amiens. The Germans had already begun withdrawing from their most exposed positions in front of Second Army, which followed up and carried out raids, for example by 18th Infantry Brigade supported by 4th Bde, RGA, at midnight on 8 August. Over the following days hostile artillery fire was met by the whole brigade firing 'Annihilating Fire Phase 1A' tasks. 301st and 223rd SBs carried out an extensive gas shell bombardment on the night of 16/17 August, ahead of Second Army launching its own part of the offensive on 18 August, with an attack on Outtersteene Ridge, which was accompanied by 'vigorous' CB fire from 4th Bde. The weather was now very hot and hazy, so aircraft shoots were carried out in the clear light of early morning, with good results until the weather broke on 26 August.

On 27 August II US Corps (27th and 30th US Divisions) moved into the line for the first time on the completion of their training. They had no artillery of their own, so VII Corps HA (which had been out of the line as a training formation) was to act as the heavy artillery HQ. 301st SB, together with 261st SB and 131st HB, were lent by 4th Bde to this temporary formation. However, II US Corps and VII Corps HA headquarters did not take over command immediately, so 301st SB remained under XIX Corps HA and reverted to 4th Bde, supporting 27th US Division at Dikkebus. The batteries reconnoitred forward positions to be taken up if the Germans evacuated Mont Kemmel. On the night of 30/31 August American patrols revealed that they had done so, and the US divisions followed them up onto the Vierstraat Ridge, while 41st Division took the left end of the ridge on 4 September. 4th Bde pushed its 60-pdr and 6-inch howitzer batteries 3,000–4,000 yards (2,700–3,700 m) forward ready for an attack on the Messines–Wytshaete Ridge beyond. The Germans continued retiring, slowly giving up the ground they had gained during the Battle of the Lys in April. However, they retained the Messines–Wytshaete Ridge, the capture of which, as in 1917, would be a major affair. From this position they fired on British batteries, 301st SB being heavily shelled on 13 September, without any damage to personnel or material. The US II Corps, after its battle training with Second Army, went south to fight with Fourth Army, while Second Army prepared for offensive action, with 4th Bde affiliated to 41st Division. 301st SB moved a section with ammunition to a forward position near 'Caffe Belge'. All such moves were done after dark and the guns kept silent until the attack was launched.

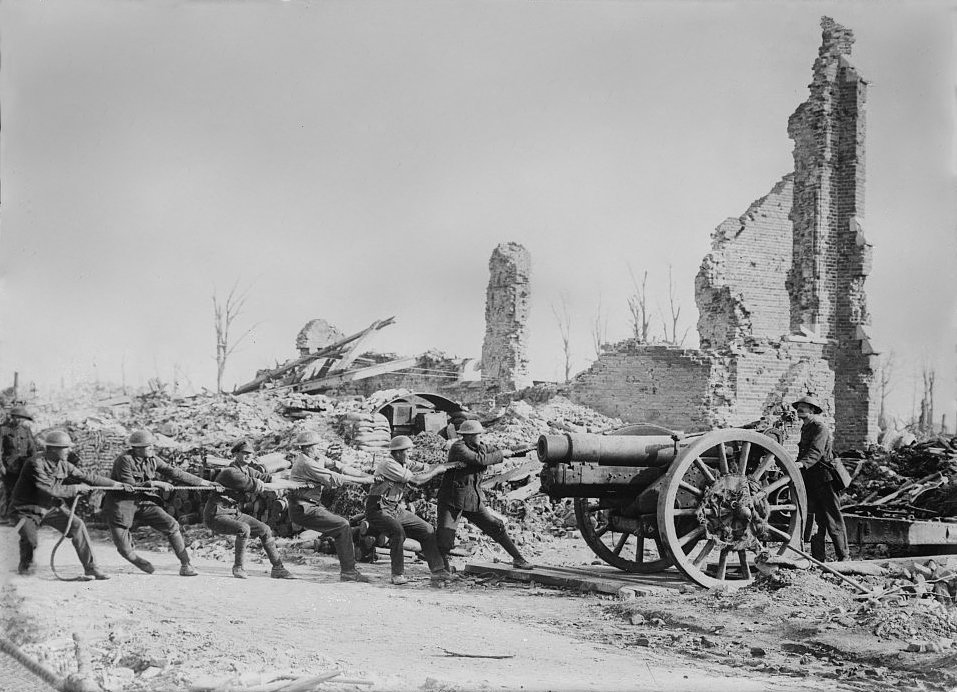
Manhandling a 6-inch howitzer through a ruined village.

The Allies launched a coordinated series of attacks all along the Western Front from 27 September: Second Army joined in on 28 September (the Fifth Battle of Ypres). Apart from routine HF and CB shoots (including a few 'shell storms') there had been no preparatory bombardment or registration to warn the enemy. Zero was at 05.30, at which time the RGA brigades began intense CB fire on all known enemy batteries, including those reported as active by No 10 Squadron Royal Air Force, many of which were neutralised with gas shells. On XIX Corps' front all the objectives were taken by 14th (Light) and 35th Divisions as far as the Ypres–Comines Canal. At the end of the day 4th Bde pushed forward four guns from each of the 60-pdr and 6-inch batteries to 'Middlesex Road', describing this as 'a very fine effort', given the bad weather and state of the roads. Next day 41st Division passed through from reserve and continued the attack towards Comines, supported by 4th Bde's guns, although two sections of 6-inch howitzers ordered to push forward to 'Battle Wood' were held up by the bad roads. 41st Division was delayed by German resistance in Zandvoorde, but it captured Comines on 30 September. Second Army's advance now had to wait until roads could be built across the shell-cratered area of the Ypres battlefields – particularly round the Hooge craters in the case of 4th Bde – and the fighting died down on 2 October. 4th Brigade did get its 60-pdrs up onto the Gheluvelt Plateau, and then used the motor transport of 223rd and 301st SBs to get provisions and ammunition up to them. Gradually the howitzer batteries also got forward and began CB shoots against the new enemy gun positions.

Second Army did not renewed its offensive until the Battle of Courtrai on 14 October: before that it endeavoured by means of bombardments, harassing fire, wire-cutting, feint attacks and active patrolling to make the Germans think that the attack was imminent. No preliminary bombardment was fired before Zero on 14 October (05.35), when 301st SB began its CB tasks, but the enemy was expecting the attack and put down their own counter-preparation barrage at 04.15. Despite this, and the delays caused by morning mist, 35th and 41st Division reached their ambitious objectives. By 09.30 4th Bde's mobile batteries (60-pdrs and 6-inch howitzers) were moving forward to take up positions south-west of Moorsele. On 15 October XIX Corps pushed forward towards the River Lys. 4th Bde was told that it was going to be rested, but this was cancelled next day when the Germans retired again and the batteries followed up. 4th Brigade spent two quiet days 17–18 October while XIX Corps got a few troops across the Lys and when patrols of 35th Division entered the town of Courtrai next day they were able to capture a bridge. XIX Corps was able to get artillery across, including 4th Bde's horsedrawn 60-pdr batteries, and by early on 20 October the Lys had been crossed along the whole of Second Army's front. The 6-inch howitzer batteries and their gun tractors had to wait at Markbeeke until the Royal Engineers could complete a heavier bridge for them.

The leading guns of 4th and 10th Bdes, RGA, supported the advance of 41st Division towards the River Scheldt. The division crossed the Courtrai–Le Bossuyt Canal and cleared the Hoogmolen ridge, but was checked by machine gun fire at Ooteghem on 24 October. A more powerful attack was put in next day supported by 4th and 10th Bdes, which had got their 6-inch howitzers up to add weight to the 60-pdrs. As far as possible the guns only used Shrapnel shell near towns and villages, so that Belgian civilians could shelter safely in cellars. Any HE shells fired near roads and bridges had to use the No 106 instantaneous fuse so as not to crater the roadway that the advancing troops would need. CB fire was restricted to enemy batteries observed to be firing, and then only a proportion of guns would reply, the remainder continuing on their bombardment tasks. At the end of 25 October, 41st Division had not quite cleared Ooteghem, but patrols next morning found that the Germans had abandoned long stretches of their defences, and the division was able to push on and secure some bridges over the Scheldt. Second Army then reorganised so that XIX Corps could exploit its successes and threaten the line of retreat of the enemy holding the Tieghem Heights. 4th Brigade crossed the canal and found good gun positions near Hoogemolen. On 27 October 301st SB and the two 60-pdr batteries moved to new positions near Knokke. On 29 October the commander of 4th Bde and battery commander of 301st SB reconnoitred a new forward position for the coming operation. This had to be in the flat country beyond the Scheldt and was overlooked by an enemy-held ridge to the southeast, so the battery would have to remain camouflaged and silent until it was needed. For the operation on 31 October, 4th and 10th Bdes exchanged their 60-pdr and 6-inch howitzers, so that 4th Bde consisted of four 60-pdr batteries for CB work, while 301st (operating as two 3-gun sections) was under 10th Bde for bombardment work. The attack on the high ground (known as the Action at Tieghem) was launched by 35th Division at 05.25 on 31 October and was a complete success, with 10th Bde providing a barrage for five hours. At the end of the day 301st and 223rd SBs were returned to the command of 4th Bde.

After two days' rest the batteries moved up to new positions north-east of Ingovghem to prepare for the next operation, but they were already reconnoitring positions 1,500–2,000 yards (1,400–1,800 m) further ahead on news that the Germans were abandoning their positions on the east bank of the Scheldt. The mobile 60-pdrs and 6-inch howitzers moved into these positions near Tieghem on the night of 4/5 November, but then the 6-inch howitzers went forward to silent positions within 2,000 yards (1,800 m) of the river. On 8 November 4th Brigade received orders to begin firing early on 9 November in support of 41st French Division, but these was cancelled when the French crossed the river without opposition. XIX Corps also got across during the night of 8/9 November, and soon the battery staffs were following 35th Division to reconnoitre routes to the river crossings, though no bridges were yet available. 35th Division continued its advance on 10 November, but that night news of the Armistice with Germany was received. 35th Division reached the line of the River Dendre before hostilities ended at 11.00 next day.

== The Rhine ==
On 14 November 4th Bde, RGA, transferred to II Corps which had been selected for the Allied occupation of the Rhineland with Second Army. The advance began on 17 November when the leading elements crossed the Armistice Line, and the batteries of 4th Bde moved to Ellezelles next day. Here they remained until 29 November, when they began following Second Army across Belgium, reaching Liège on 7 December. It crossed the German frontier on 10 December and completed its march by crossing the Rhine by the Hohenzollern Bridge at Cologne on 18 December. It was billeted in Opladen near Leverkusen.

4th Brigade settled down to occupation duties at Opladen, the batteries reconnoitring positions if they were required to support 3rd Division holding the left sector of the Cologne Bridgehead. Demobilisation of coalminers and other critical workers began at the end of December and education schemes were started for the men awaiting demobilisation. On 19 January all the troops stood by in case of a threatened strike by German railway workers, and on 3 February the brigade was called out to enforce the 9-hour working day at the Opladen railway works. Although the brigade deployed 20 Lewis guns and was reinforced by the 1st Auckland Battalion of the New Zealand Division, the day passed off without incident. Demobilisation continued, and on 31 March 4th Bde HQ left for England to hand over to a new 4th Brigade, RGA, which had been formed in the Regular Army. 92nd Brigade, RGA, took over the batteries including 301st Siege Battery and oversaw their final disbandment before the end of 1919.
