= 303rd Siege Battery, Royal Garrison Artillery =

Artillery unit of the British Army in World War I

303rd Siege Battery, RGA
- Cap Badge of the Royal Regiment of Artillery
- Active: 17 November 1916–1920
- Country: United Kingdom
- Branch: British Army
- Role: Siege Artillery
- Size: Battery
- Part of: Royal Garrison Artillery
- Equipment: BL 6-inch 26 cwt howitzer
- Engagements: Battle of Messines; Third Battle of Ypres; Battle of Cambrai; German Spring Offensive; Hundred Days Offensive

Insignia
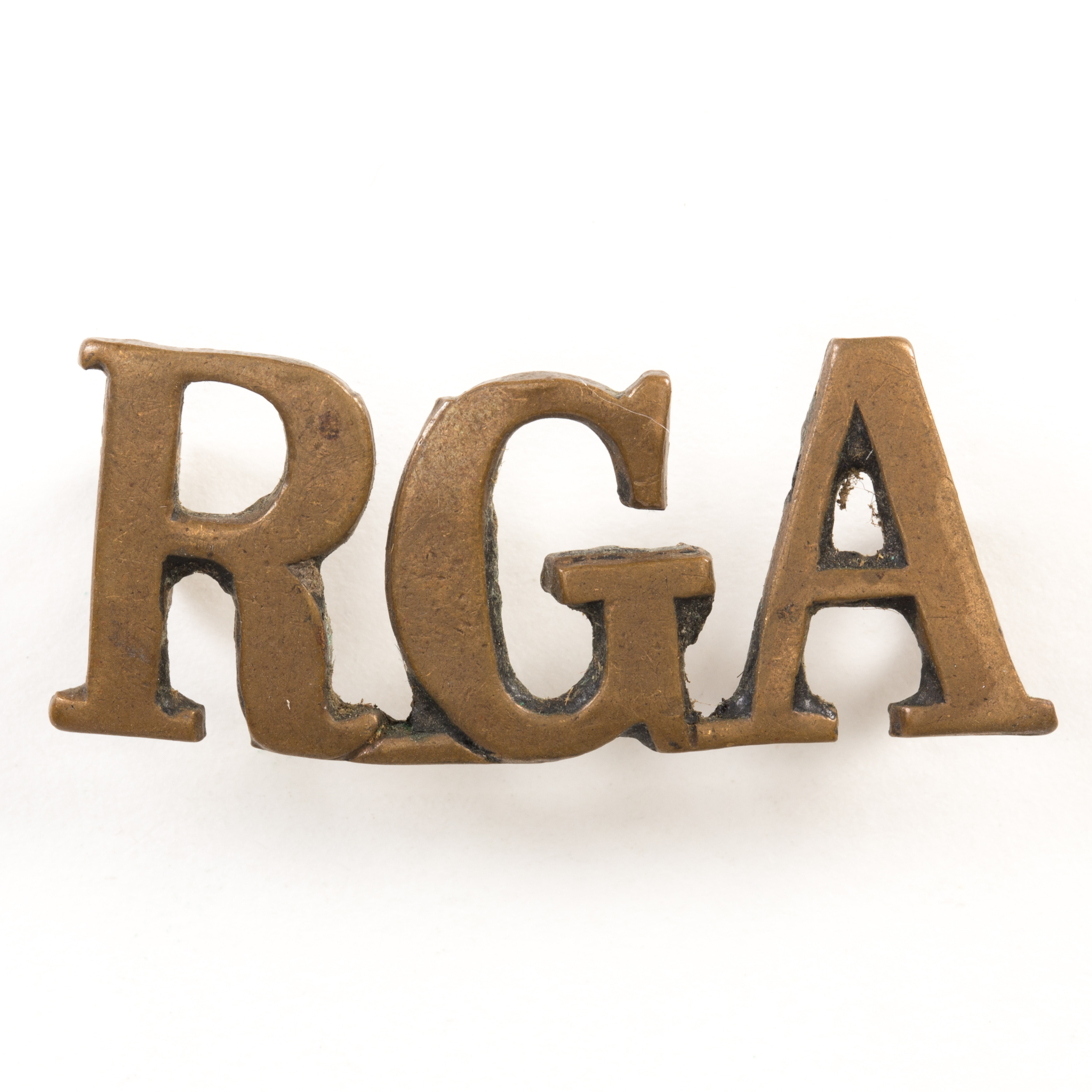
- Shoulder title

303rd Siege Battery (303rd SB) was a heavy howitzer unit of Britain's Royal Garrison Artillery (RGA) in World War I. Formed in November 1916, it served on the Western Front at the battles of Messines, Ypres and Cambrai, in the 'Great Retreat' during the German Spring Offensive and it supported the Canadian Corps in the final Allied Hundred Days Offensive. After the Armistice with Germany the battery served in the Allied occupation of the Rhineland until it was disbanded in 1920.

== Mobilisation and training ==
Once the fighting on the Western Front had bogged down into Trench warfare in 1914, there was an urgent need for siege artillery, and a large number of new RGA units were hurriedly formed over the following years. The Army Council instructed that 303rd Siege Battery was to be formed at Plymouth with effect from 17 November 1916, conforming to the establishment laid down for 6-inch breechloading howitzer batteries. The battery was accordingly formed at Crownhill Fort, Plymouth, where drafts of men were sent from various RGA batteries, companies and training schools. On 10 January 1917 the battery moved to Ewshot in north Hampshire to continue its training. After a succession of junior officers had acted as officer commanding (OC), Captain W.T. Saidler, a Territorial Force officer, arrived as acting OC; he later served as battery captain. On 2 February the battery marched to Aldershot, where the men were accommodated in Tournay Barracks and trained on the modern BL 6-inch 26 cwt howitzer. There was an outbreak of measles in the barracks, and one officer and 38 other ranks (ORs) were removed from the battery and did not return. On 26 February the battery went by train to Hut Camp at Lydd, where it carried out shooting practice on the ranges. It began its final training at No 27 Camp at Larkhill from 15 March. Here it was joined on 29 March by Major H.W. Lockhart, a regular officer, who became its first permanent OC.

== Western Front ==
The battery mobilised for overseas service at Larkhill, and after an advance party left on 1 April 1917 the main body marched next day to Amesbury station, where it entrained for Southampton Docks to embark on the SS Londonderry. The battery disembarked the following morning at Le Havre; 301st SB from Larkhill crossed to France at the same time. On 8 April 303rd SB entrained its four 6-inch howitzers and personnel, and arrived at Bailleul next day, together with 301st SB. Both new batteries then marched to join 41st Heavy Artillery Group (HAG) at Dranoutre behind the southern part of the Ypres Salient held by Second Army.

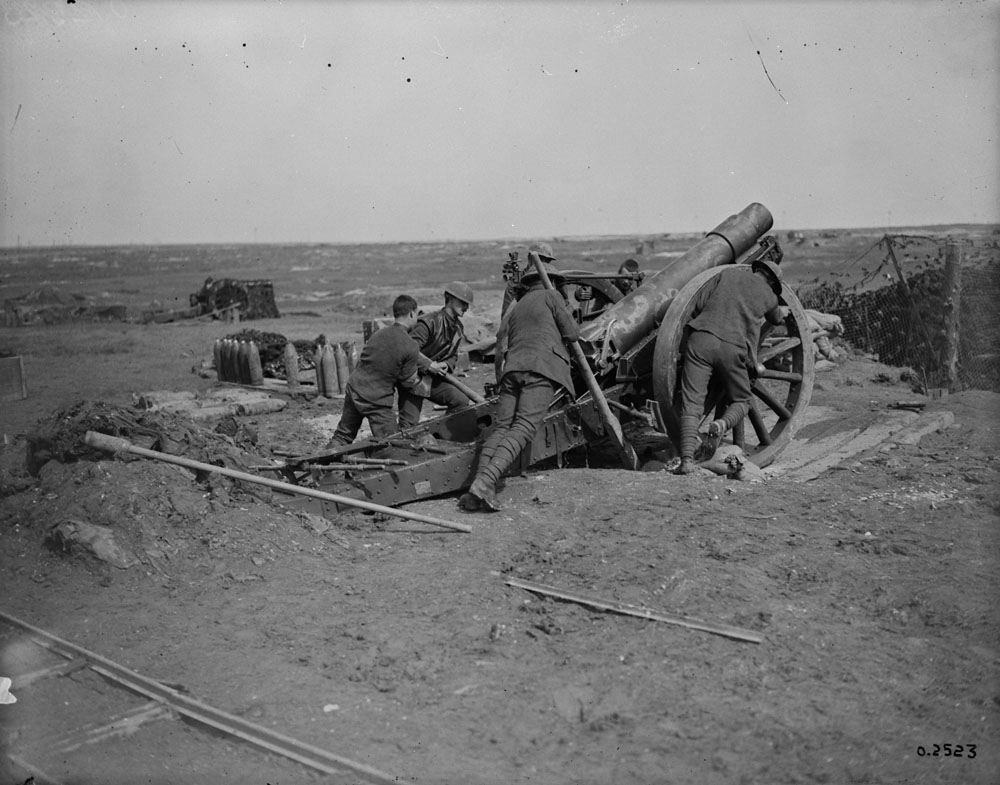
A 6-inch 26 cwt howitzer in action on the Western Front.

=== Messines ===
On arrival 303rd SB began working on its gun emplacements, shell and cartridge recesses, and shelter trenches, coming under shellfire for the first time on 13 April. By 19 April it had three of its four howitzers in position, and next day began firing a few shots to calibrate its guns and register targets. For the rest of April it fired on various targets, including its first shoots with aircraft and balloon observation, and retaliation shoots for incoming enemy shellfire, the battery suffering its first casualties in early May. 41st HAG supporting IX Corps was mainly employed for counter-battery (CB) fire, but on one occasion 303rd SB fired 400 rounds on the Dammstrasse, a notable defensive position behind the German lines. The observation post (OP) on Kemmel Hill had good observation of the Dammstrasse and other targets on and over the Messines–Wytschaete Ridge in front. One of the guns now developed a mechanical fault and had to be taken out of action for repair. This was the first of many such cases, with the battery constantly having to send one or more guns to the workshops. The problems became more acute as the volume of fire increased, and by 7 May the whole battery was taken out of action. While their guns were repaired, the gunners were employed to lay light railways for bringing up ammunition. Second Army was preparing for an attack on the Messines–Wytschaete Ridge, and after the battery returned to action on 12 May the volume of firing increased. 303rd SB sometimes received 1000 rounds of ammunition in a single night, and by 25 May it had accumulated a dump of 4000 rounds in preparation for the attack. The main bombardment for the attack began on 3 June with a special bombardment of Wytschaete village on IX Corps' front, which was expected to be strongly defended. However, 303rd SB's guns were still giving trouble, and by 3 June only 'B' gun was serviceable: it fired continuously up to the time of the attack on Z Day. In reply the battery received occasional harassing fire, sometimes with gas shell.

Second Army's artillery plan emphasised CB fire, and simulated attacks were made to induce the enemy to reveal his hidden guns: over 200 hostile battery positions were intensively shelled during two days of concentrated CB fire prior to Z Day. British artillery fire died away about 02.40 on the morning of 7 June (Z Day). Before dawn, at 03.10, the surprise element of the plan was revealed: the simultaneous explosion of 19 huge mines dug under the ridge, which blew the German front line system to bits before the infantry went over the top. IX Corps' objectives were the line from the Spanbroekmolen salient to the 'Nag's Nose' salient at Hollandscheschuur, including the village of Wytschaete, while X Corps was to take the ridge further north, including the Dammstrasse and the woods beyond. The British guns opened fire immediately after the mine explosions at Zero, and 41st Bde's batteries were soon switched to their second tasks as the infantry overran the German positions. The results of the limited attack were spectacular, with the whole ridge being captured. In the IX Corps' area, the 36th (Ulster) Division found that 'the ground about the strongpoints had been literally ploughed up by the bursts of the high explosive (HE) shells during the bombardment; the barbed wire entanglements which had protected this area below the crest lay piled in twisted heaps, and everywhere was the wreckage of once solidly built dugouts and shelters'. Similarly, the Dammstrasse was successfully captured by X Corps. 303rd SB's 'B' gun, manned by two detachments, one relieving the other, fired 350 rounds during the day.

=== Ypres ===
The day after the battle 303rd SB was posted to 23rd HAG with Fifth Army, in the northern part of the Ypres Salient. That evening the battery marched to Vlamertinge with two guns (the other two being in the workshops), which it was ordered to hand over to 168th SB, and the men were then taken by lorry to the siege park. Next day they went to a rest camp at Houtkerque. On 12 June an advance party went to Ypres to prepare gun positions, the rest of the battery following three days later and going into billets at Vlamertinge. The new battery position was in Ypres itself, close to the ruins of the Cloth Hall. 303d SB's two guns were returned from the workshops and it was loaned two other guns by 279th SB. The battery had these guns in action on 22 June. Fifth Army was preparing for the Ypres Offensive, and fresh batteries were constantly arriving. 23rd HAG was part of XIV Corps Heavy Artillery (HA), but 303rd SB positioned further south came under 90th HAG when that group arrived at Vlamertinge and joined XIX Corps HA on 20 June. Four days later 303rd SB transferred to 70th HAG, then to 62nd HAG when that HQ arrived at Vlamertinge on 5 July. Ypres was under constant enemy bombardment and the billets at Vlamertinge were also shelled, the battery suffering a number of casualties, while much of the ammunition brought up each night was destroyed before it could be used. The battery continued to suffer from poor serviceability of its guns, all of which were out of action by the end of June.

From 29 June to 7 July 303rd SB's gunners worked on new gun positions outside the city near the Yser Canal. Moving its last repaired gun in on the night of 6 July a single enemy shell killed corporal Harry Jukes 32, and wounded 19 other men. Following the trickle of casualties while in the city, 303rd SB only had enough gunners to man three of its guns. It had been planned to increase the battery's establishment to six guns, and on 8 July a section of 1 officer and 57 ORs joined from the recently-arrived 371st SB, (Note: 371st Siege Battery, RGA, had been formed on 14 February 1917 at Prees Heath Camp, and its personnel had landed in France on 25 June before being posted to XIX Corps HA. The other section of the battery was posted to 301st SB.) but this reinforcement only brought the battery back up to its four-gun establishment. On 10 July the battery was targeted by a destructive hostile CB shoot, next day the battery office and quartermaster's stores were wrecked, and on 12/13 July the whole Ypres area was subjected to an all-night gas bombardment, these events causing further casualties, particularly among the reinforcements. 303rd SB's forward observation officers (FOOs) occasionally used 'Haslar House' in Sint-Jan as their OP: this was the concrete-filled shell of a large house, which was gradually chipped away by enemy shellfire to reveal the concrete core. On 20 July Maj Lockhart was promoted to command 51st HAG and Acting-Maj E.H. Huxford arrived from 49th SB to take over the battery. However, he was already suffering from the effects of gas, and was sent to hospital after three days. Acting-Capt E.G. Silverton took over temporary command, but he was killed when a shell hit the battery command post on 26 July, also wounding another officer and mortally wounding the battery command assistant. Captain A.J. Steward from 27th SB was appointed temporary OC, and as the dugouts in the canal bank were now under fire from super-heavy guns the command post was moved.

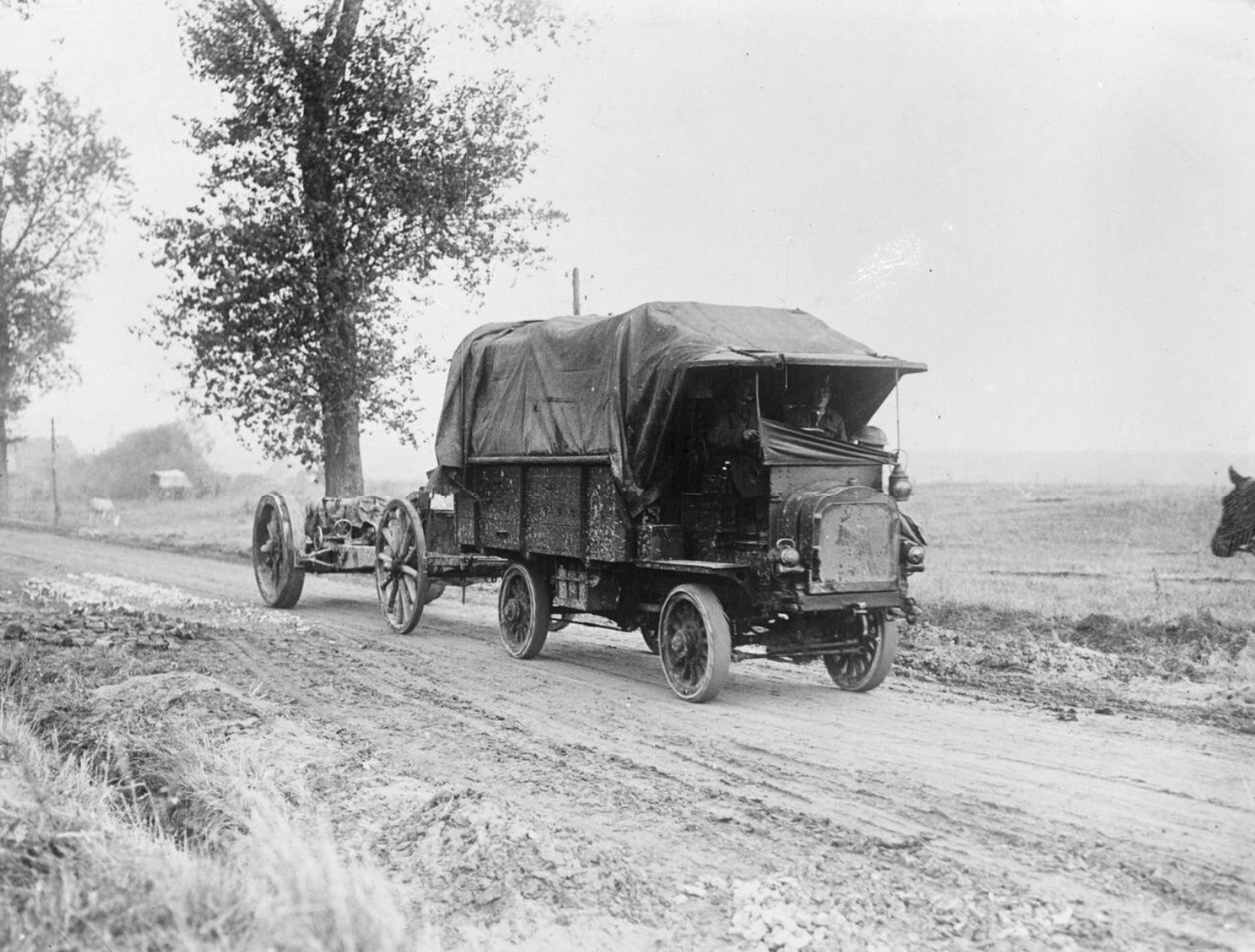
FWD Model B lorry towing a 6-inch 26 cwt howitzer.

Since 7 July the battery had been carrying out registration and aeroplane shoots and on 16 July the preliminary bombardment for the Ypres offensive had begun. This bombardment reached high intensity from 29 July, and 303rd SB's four guns fired 988 rounds on 30 July. The first phase of the offensive (the Battle of Pilckem Ridge) was launched at 03.50 on 31 July with a heavy barrage. The infantry went forward and by the time dawn broke at 04.40 they had broken through the German outpost line and advanced about 800 yards (730 m) up the shell-pitted slope of Pilckem Ridge. At 05.05 fresh companies leapfrogged through to continue the advance against the belt of fortified farms that protected the German second line. On XIX Corps' front some of these held out for up to 3 hours, but soon after 09.00 the British infantry had, as planned, gained a foothold across the Steenbeek stream. However, the advance of the reserve brigades to the third objective was badly coordinated and towards evening the Germans counter-attacked, pushing XIX Corps back to the Steenbeek and recapturing 'Wurst Farm'. That evening heavy rain set in and continued for three days, preventing air observation and turning the battlefield into a sea of mud. This made the forward movement of reinforcements, supplies, guns and ammunition extremely difficult and delayed further operations.

From its existing positions, 303rd SB was still within range and it did not have to move forward. Over the early days of August it responded to numerous SOS calls for defensive barrages against German counter-attacks on the Steenbeek line: on 3 August alone it fired nearly 400 rounds on these tasks. The numerically weak gun detachments were becoming exhausted, and although a few reinforcements arrived on 5 August, a premature explosion in No 3 gun destroyed the gun and injured 8 ORs, the sergeant being mortally wounded. Next day a German gas shell landed on No 2 gun, breaking the trail, leaving the battery with just two guns in action. The gunners began work on new advanced positions north-east of the village of Sint-Jan for the next phase of the offensive. These positions were under observation from the Germans in front, and the diggers were subjected to bursts of harassing shellfire. Captain Steward was promoted to major on 15 August, but went down with 'trench fever' and was evacuated next day; Lieutenant J.N. Green became acting-captain and OC.

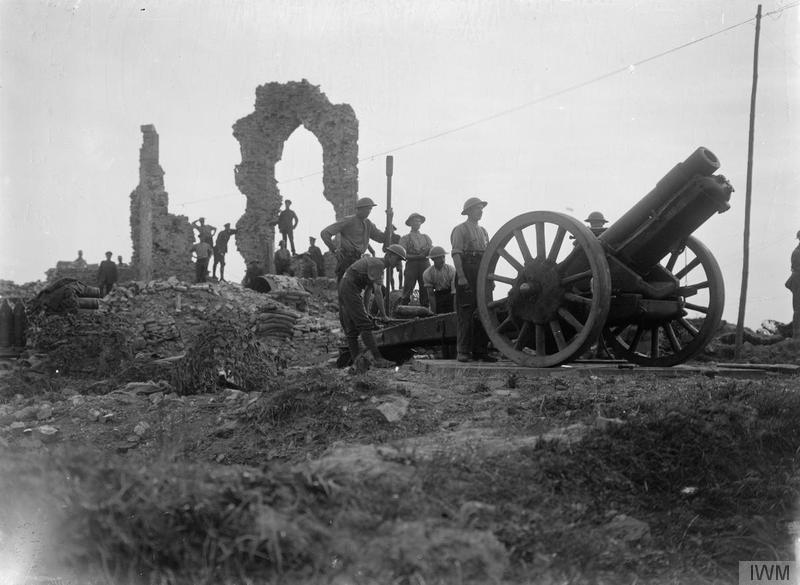
6-inch howitzer in action near Ypres, August 1917.

The offensive resumed with the Battle of Langemarck on 16 August. The attack was not a success: many key points had not been adequately bombarded, and smoke obscured the OPs and SOS signals, so German counter-attacks were effective. The exhausted infantry had to wade through mud in the flooded Steenbeek valley. XIX Corps in particular gained little ground. 303rd SB fired 913 rounds during the day. There was now a lull in large-scale operations as Second Army took the lead and carefully prepared for a resumption of the offensive. Since 31 July the battery had sometimes used Bossaert's Farm as an OP, but this was an exposed position in the support line, surrounded by mud. Later the battery manned an OP in 'Liverpool Trench'. From this the FOOs could register guns onto Wurst Farm and other strongpoints as Fifth Army continued local attacks on the pillboxes protecting the Passchendaele Ridge. Ypres and Vlamertinge were now practically free from shellfire, but were bombed almost nightly from the air and the battery positions were still in range of German guns. Captain W.D. Bennett arrived to take temporary command of 303rd SB on 26 August.

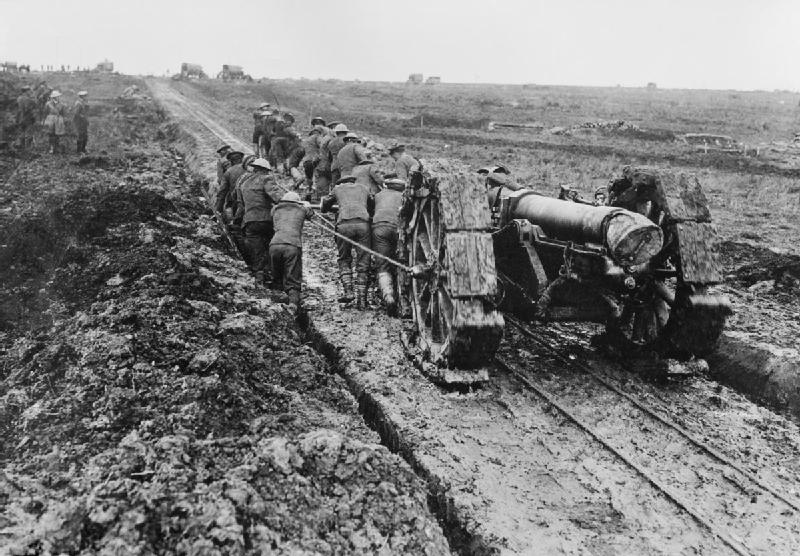
6-inch howitzer being moved through mud on the Western Front.

On 3 September the Right Section of 303rd SB was relieved by 119th SB, who took over the guns in position; 303rd SB's gunners went back to Poperinge for a short rest. After the succession of temporary commanders, Maj James Delap now arrived from 216th SB on 4 September to take over as OC of 303rd SB, remaining in command for the rest of the war; Capt W.D. Bennett became second-in-command. The whole battery was then ordered south to join Third Army. The Transport Section's lorries took the stores (for six guns) by road while the advance party of gunners went by train on 7 September. The two parties took over 119th SB's guns and dugouts in Havrincourt Wood, where the battery came under 14th HAG in IV Corps. It commenced firing on 14 September, the usual tasks being CB shoots or harassing fire (HF) on trench junctions, roads, railways, canal bridges etc, round Havrincourt, Flesquières and Ribécourt, sometimes directed by aircraft, otherwise from a good OP situated in High Wood. Left Section of the battery arrived on 22 September and was billeted in Metz-en-Couture, where the battery began constructing a camp of Nissen huts and dugouts. Although work had to be suspended when a nearby field battery was shelled, the camp was well camouflaged and did not receive any enemy fire. The battery had been reinforced to full strength but still only had four guns, so there were opportunities to rotate gun detachments and carry out training. On 1 October the battery came under the command of 29th HAG when that HQ exchanged sectors with 14th HAG. Although the camp at Metz was well camouflaged, the Germans had spotted the gun positions. On 10 October the gun pits of Right Section were subjected to a destructive CB shoot by 5.9-inch guns ('Five-Nines'). Both pits were smashed and No 1 gun received two direct hits, but No 2 gun was away for repair at the time and there were no casualties among the personnel. Two days later Left Section was shelled for the first time. Right Section prepared a new position on the Gouzeaucourt road, about half a mile from the billets, with covered gun pits, and was back in action on 28 October. On 29 October the battery carried out a special bombardment of a nest of enemy trench mortars (Minenwerfers) that had been located at 'Boggart's Hole' on the western edge of the Havrincourt Chateau grounds. Major Delap personally conducted the shoot from a Royal Field Artillery (RFA) OP in the front line. The first round was fired with a low charge in an attempt to achieve a steep angle of descent onto the target, but this proved too unsteady, so the rest of the 100-round shoot was carried out with normal charges. The nest was silenced and the principal mortar, nicknamed 'Peter' did not fire again. In the same shoot a German company HQ was destroyed and a concrete OP badly damaged.

=== Cambrai ===
The Havrincourt sector had been quiet when 303rd SB arrived, but Third Army was planning a new surprise attack on the Hindenburg Line in this sector (the Battle of Cambrai), and the artillery build-up began. On 30 October 303rd SB was ordered to push Left Section forward from Havrincourt Wood to a new advanced position. With great difficulty the guns were hoisted onto the trucks of a Decauville Railway running through the wood and hauled along by horses. The guns were positioned early next morning and ordered to remain silent. Other batteries were also digging new positions, screened by the prevailing bad weather, and 303rd SB had a 50-strong party dealing with huge consignments of ammunition. For this operation Third Army was employing new artillery methods. To ensure surprise there was no preliminary bombardment, nor pre-registration of guns, but their targets had been accurately surveyed. The guns had all been calibrated, and batteries were equipped with guns that had identical characteristics and would fire together. The CB batteries would not attempt to destroy enemy batteries, but only to neutralise them. Right Section of 303rd SB was active on CB shoots in conjunction with aircraft and the Sound ranging section of 3rd Field Survey Company, Royal Engineers (RE). On 15 November many new batteries moved silently into position, scores of tanks were brought in by night and hidden in the woods, and 51st (Highland) Division moved into camouflaged quarters in Metz and Havrincourt Wood. Third Army planned to send a mobile HAG comprising one 60-pounder heavy battery and one 6-inch howitzer siege battery forward with each attacking infantry division. 303rd SB and 38th (Welsh) Heavy Bty were temporarily attached to 54th HAG for this operation and ordered to prepare to move forward with 51st (H) Division. Because of the weather the roads would be too soft for gun tractors, so 303rd SB borrowed horse teams from 119th Heavy Battery, accompanied by horsedrawn General Service waggons packed with stores and water for the move.

At Zero hour (06.20) on 20 November, the field artillery opened up with a creeping barrage and smokescreen to hide the advance of the tanks. 303rd SB's fireplan was to last 20 minutes on the distant village of Fontaine (51st (H) Division's furthest objective), then to switch to the Flesquières ridge for 30 minutes when the tanks and infantry would be assaulting it, and finally onto reserve trenches beyond. These tasks were complete by 09.50, the battery having fired 420 rounds. On III Corps' front the infantry assault, led by hundreds of tanks, had been a stunning success, but for IV Corps the picture was less good. As soon as the neutralising CB fire lifted off the German field batteries, they manned their guns, pulled them out of their pits and engaged the British tanks as they crossed the Flesquières ridge, destroying a number. As a result, despite starting well, 51st (H) Division became badly held up. Although 51st (H) Divisional Artillery's field batteries did move forward on 20 November, any plans to send the mobile HAG forward for the exploitation phase had to be abandoned. At 04.30 next morning 303rd SB sent a party to establish a forward OP, but it was of little use in a fast-moving battle as 51st (H) Division fought its ay over Flesquières ridge. By the end of the day the guns were got into position at Trescault, but took no part in the fighting. The battery spent the third day of the battle in this position, but took the opportunity to bring up ammunition, which served as a forward dump for the rest of the battle. 51st (H) DA was reluctant to push the battery forward for fear of blocking the road, but on the evening of 22 November 303rd SB were ordered up. By 04.30 next morning it had passed through Ribécourt and hauled its guns up a steep bank to bring them into action behind Flesquières. To make a roadway the gunners used bricks from a house in Ribécourt that the battery had previously destroyed. 51st (H) DA gave the battery Fontaine as its target, and it established an OP in a knocked-out tank. The captured Hindenburg Line provided deep dugouts for battery HQ and billets for off-duty detachments. Over the following days IV Corps became involved in bitter fighting in the villages and woods, and 303rd SB was given a variety of targets in Fontaine and Bourlon, and on the roads from Cambrai. The battery was working in mud and snow, and was under nightly harassing fire, but casualties were light. On 27 November, after 51st (H) Division had been relieved, a hastily organised attack was made by the Guards Division on Fontaine and Bourlon. Although the divisional commander had asked for the heaviest possible bombardment, only two and a half 6-inch howitzer batteries under corps control had targeted Fontaine the previous day. Guards Divisional Artillery's field guns were reinforced, but the only heavy artillery in direct support was the two mobile batteries of 54th HAG, which had no time to register their targets. During the attack 303rd SB fired at targets in the northern part of Fontaine, while 38th (W) HB fired on the surrounds of Bourlon (but not the village itself, in case British outposts continued to hold out there). With this feeble artillery support, the attack of 27 November was a failure resulting in heavy casualties for the Guards.

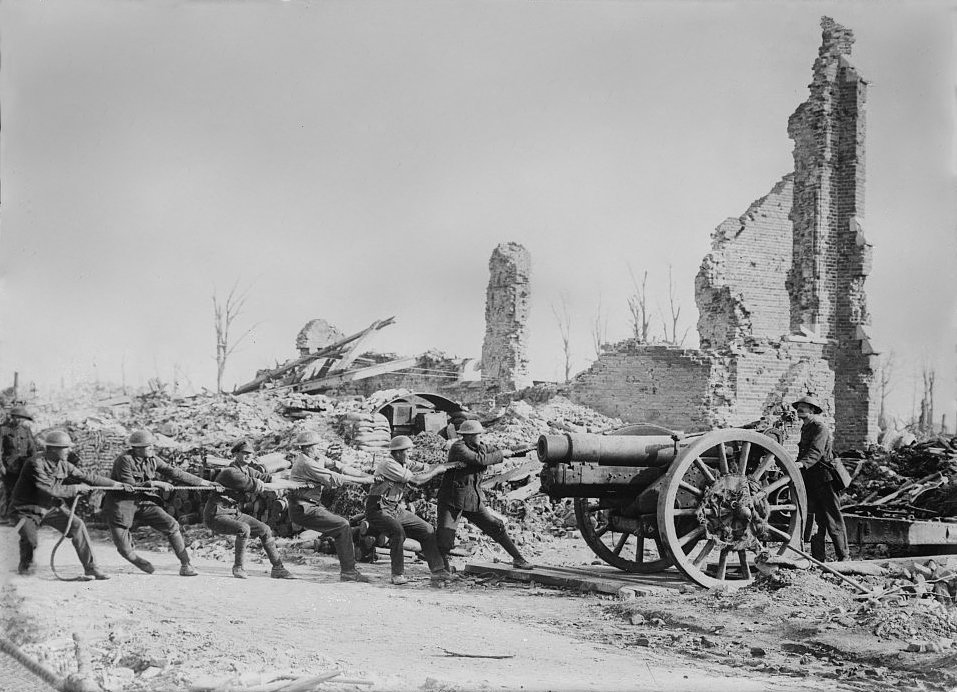
Manhandling a 6-inch howitzer through a ruined village.

Before dawn on 30 November the Germans launched a counter-attack with massive artillery support. 303rd SB's OP could see noting because of smoke, but the battery responded to numerous SOS calls to fire barrages on previously fixed lines. It transpired that the weight of the German attack was directed against the flanks of the salient created by the British advance, and at first IV Corps was not much affected. The German guns fired steadily, but not particularly accurately, on the British battery positions and Bourlon Wood with gas and HE. The CB duel continued until 08.50, when the Germans opened a fierce bombardment of the corps' front positions. About 09.30 a gun targeting 303rd SB became so persistent that the detachment of No 1 gun had to be withdrawn. Ribécourt was heavily shelled, and the battery's telephone line to 54th HAG was constantly broken so runners had to be used. The battery noted numerous field batteries and infantry units in movement in different directions, and at 10.30 a runner brought the order 'Stand by to destroy your guns'. These were prepared accordingly, but there followed a series of conflicting orders: to pull out all guns, or to leave two in action and pull out two. Eventually one horse team arrived, and the battery used it to pull all four of its guns out onto the road, and then move one back to Havrincourt, while the others were dragged by manpower through Ribécourt to the railway half a mile away. On arrival, they found 68th SB already loading at the station. While waiting for another train, an officer from Guards DA arrived with news that the situation appeared to have eased (Guards Division had recaptured Gouzeaucourt on the right flank), and requesting 303rd SB to resume shelling Fontaine. The gunners positioned the guns on the platforms abandoned by 68th SB, and by 20.30 303rd SB could report to Guards DA that it was back in action.

=== Winter 1917–18 ===
The battery remained in this position throughout the winter. Unusually for a siege battery it was only 1,100 yards (1,000 m) behind the new front line at Flesquières and just within range of enemy machine gun bullets (the field artillery they had seen galloping around on 30 November were now firing from further back). The battery established a rear position for two guns, with billets in Trescault, and constructed dugouts for the forward position at Ribécourt with the help of an Australian tunnelling company. For the first few days 303rd SB was virtually the only heavy artillery at the disposal of the infantry commanders in the line. Early in December an enemy attack was observed massing on the south side of 'Nine Wood', and the battery responded almost instantly, breaking up the attack at a range of only 1,200 yards (1,100 m). Otherwise, the battery was mainly used for CB shoots. On 11 December a third gun position was established midway between the other two. The battery laboured through the winter to improve shelter at its positions, and also salvaged and sent to the rear a German 5.9-inch naval gun that had been overrun on 20 November.

With the conclusion of the Cambrai operations, 303rd SB had returned to the command of 29th HAG on 7 December. Heavy Artillery Groups were now becoming permanent RGA Brigades rather than ad hoc groups. On 28 December 29th HAG was redesignated 29th (Mobile) Bde, with two 60-pdr batteries (12th and 121st HBs) and two 6-inch howitzer batteries (195th and 303rd SBs). 303rd SB remained part of this brigade for the rest of the war.

On 30 December the Germans made a determined effort to capture 'Welsh Ridge' defending the right flank of the Flesquières salient. The attack was preceded by heavy CB fire on British batteries, including 303rd SB, and its Forward Section carried out its SOS tasks despite heavy neutralisation fire. Rear Section also received attention from 'Five-Nines' firing HE and gas, and the detachment of No 1 gun had to fire while wearing their respirators. The telephone lines having been cut by the shelling, Rear Section fired their SOS tasks acting on information from a nearby field battery. The attack was driven off by III Corps. During the rest of the winter the battery was under close observation from enemy aircraft and subjected to bursts of fire that hampered its ability to fire long bombardments, as well as causing some casualties. One gun of Forward Section was damaged and sent away for repair, but its remaining gun did good work with No 15 Squadron, Royal Flying Corps on 26–27 January 1918. At the end of February 303rd SB prepared to withdraw for rest and training. The enemy must have noticed, because as Forward Section pulled out on the night of 25/26 February it was subjected to airburst 10.5 cm HE shells overhead at 30-second intervals, and bursts of 10.5 and 7.7 cm fire every 20 minutes. Nevertheless it got away and loaded its guns onto the Decauville light railway, which took them to Étricourt, though the men had to help with drag ropes because the engine could not cope with the weight. Although they had to repair shell damage to the Decauville track, Rear Section got away more easily the following night, the train hauling the guns and detachments on separate journeys. From Étricourt the personnel moved in stages by train and road to billets in Ville-sur-Ancre. The guns were towed via Bapaume, where they were joined on 27 February by two new guns to bring the battery up to its full 6-gun establishment. On 2 March the battery returned through Bapaume to a rest camp at Beaulencourt where the whole of 29th Bde was concentrated for training.

=== Spring Offensive ===
303rd SB was still at the Beaulencourt rest camp when the Germans launched their long-anticipated Spring Offensive on 21 March. This opened with a massive bombardment from 05.00, which included Bapaume. Third and Fifth Armies were attacked, the flanks of the Flesquières salient being rapidly penetrated. Although at rest, 29th Bde was part of the GHQ Reserve and 303rd SB was packed up and on the road by 09.00 at 30 minutes' notice to move. 29th Bde was soon put at the disposal of Third Army, which allocated it back to IV Corps on the northern flank of the salient, and 303rd SB sent forward a party to reconnoitre positions round Frémicourt. At dusk the battery came up, and under moonlight reached Frémicourt, where the howitzers were unhooked from the FWD gun tractors and man-hauled into position behind the railway embankment on platforms made from the heavy planking of nearby huts. In the darkness the guns began firing in support of 51st (H) Division, which had been pushed back but still presented a solid front. Firing continued throughout 22 March at one target after another, the range steadily shortening as the enemy continued to advance, particularly on 51st (H) Division's open left flank. By nightfall the railway embankment was manned by infantry of 51st (H) Division as their support line, and the OP on the hill in front could see masses of enemy troops advancing. The positions were already being swept by machine gun fire when 303rd SB was ordered back through Bancourt to the outskirts of Bapaume. The lorries later went back to recover remaining ammunition from the first position, and afterwards the battery used ammunition as it was delivered by rail. On 23 March the infantry saw the enemy massing for attack, and all four batteries of 29th Bde were brought down on them, causing terrible casualties, Then, just as the enemy began their attack, IV Corps HA ordered the batteries to shorten their range by 500 yards (460 m), catching the same mass of infantry a second time and completely halting the attack without infantry action. During the day 51st (H) Division was ordered to retire about 8,000 yards (7,300 m), conforming to the retirement from the exposed Flesquières salient to its right. The plan had been to wait until nightfall but enemy pressure meant that the division had to move in daylight. During the night the batteries continued to 'search' roads that the enemy were likely to be using. 303rd SB was under orders to be ready to move back from 09.00 on 24 March, but did not come from 51st (H) DA until 13.00. They pulled back through Bapaume, which was under heavy shellfire and full of stragglers; 303rd SB thought that it was the last heavy battery to make it through the town. It took up positions at Thilloy, with accommodation in an abandoned hutted camp. However, it was then ordered further back, and the guns had to be manhandled back to the road to be hooked up to the FWDs. Having passed through Grévillers it came into action at Loupart Wood, but the infantry were already digging defences there, so it was sent to join the long line of transport retreating through Irles and down the steep descent to Miraumont and the Ancre crossing. The roads allocated to 29th Bde were totally inadequate for heavy artillery, and Maj Delap considered that 5 minutes' rain or a single puncture would have led to the capture of the entire battery by the pursuing enemy.

Having crossed the river the battery turned north and reached Achiet-le-Petit soon after dawn on 25 March. It was ordered to go into action at Serre, but when it reached that village it met the Commander, RA, of 51st (H) Division and the commanding officer of 29th Bde, and was ordered to continue its march. It went on through Beaussart, billeting at Acheux overnight, where IV Corps HA ordered it to carry on next day to Frohen-le-Grand, near Doullens. Here orders were received that only horse-drawn batteries could be employed across the old Somme battlefields, so the tractor-drawn 6-inch howitzers remained behind to reorganise and refit, while 29th Bde continued mobile operations with its 60-pdr batteries. On 28 March 303rd SB returned with its guns to Beaussart Station, where it relieved the horsedrawn 59th SB, and positioned its guns to complete 59th SB's night task. It spent the following days improving its billets and dugouts, and harassing the Serre–Puisieux road until IV Corps HA could compile new lists of CB targets. The battery position was just behind the crest of the Colincamps ridge and the new front line was as yet undetermined, but on 30 March the New Zealand Division recaptured the ridge and the shellfire on the battery positions declined somewhat. A resumption of the German offensive was daily expected, and it came on 5 April (the Battle of the Ancre). 303rd SB's positions were 'showered' with Shrapnel shell, but the New Zealanders threw back three separate attacks and halted the advance. This was the final attack on this sector, and the focus of the German offensive moved northwards. During the retreat and subsequent fighting 303rd SB had suffered a number of casualties, but these were not as severe compared as some batteries.

Over the following weeks the battery improved its positions and accommodation, such as constructing a plank road from railway sleepers up to Left Section's gun pits, and deeper dugouts. It was joined by other heavy batteries, with which it shared the usual trench warfare tasks of destroying enemy roads and communications, dumps and billets. At first the battery OP was in an orchard near Auchonvillers (known to the gunners as 'Eight-Inch Villas'), but this was poorly sited and for special shoots the battery also used a better OP to the flank on Mesnil Ridge, despite the disadvantage of using 8,000 feet (2,400 m) of telephone cable. However, in this area the signallers were able to re-use buried cables dating from the Battle of the Somme. On 23 April 303rd SB and 12th HB established an OP in a pillbox in front of Colincamps, known as 'Apple-tree OP', with its own buried cable. This OP was used for the next three months. As air reconnaissance of the area improved, hostile batteries were targeted, 303rd SB often carrying out two 300-round air-directed CB shoots a day. Once in June the battery carried out two simultaneous shoots, one directed by an aircraft, the other by a balloon. Towards the end of June the Spanish flu epidemic affected the battery, particularly the signallers, but good respirator discipline meant that the battery suffered no gas casualties, despite the number of times the rear areas were targeted with gas shell. On 23 July the battery heard that it was soon to be relieved, and at noon on 30 July it was ordered to move that night to an unknown destination.

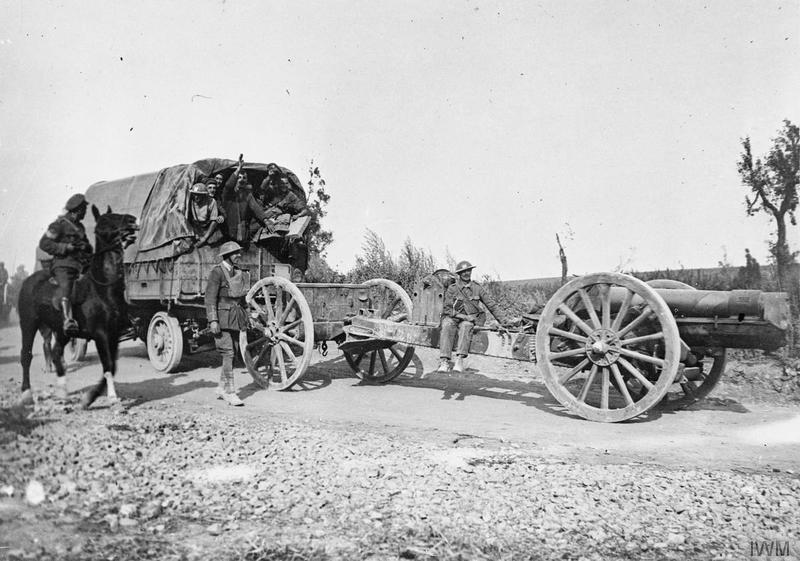
A 6-inch howitzer being towed up to the line in August 1918.

=== Hundred Days Offensive ===
29th Brigade concentrated on 31 July at Vauchelles-lès-Authie where it was in GHQ and Corps Reserve. The batteries were on the move again on 3 August towards Amiens, where Fourth Army was preparing to launch the Allied counter-offensive. On arrival 29th Bde was attached to the Canadian Corps, which had secretly moved down from First Army for this operation, leaving most of its own heavy artillery behind. 29th Brigade's batteries moved into position behind Villers-Bretonneux, 303rd SB being ordered to reconnoitre a position at Gentelles. However, having dumped 1500 rounds at this position, and with the guns already moving towards it along narrow roads, the battery was ordered to return and park alongside the Amiens–Villers-Bretonneux road. This was achieved with difficulty in the darkness, and the battery then waited until 6 August for further instructions. 29th Brigade was then sent to positions in the Bois l'Abbaie, but there was only room for three batteries, and 303rd SB was forced to find a suitable position in front of it, making it the most advanced heavy battery in the operation. The guns were camouflaged as corn stacks and remained silent. There was no registration of the guns, which were to fire by the map. The Battle of Amiens was launched at 04.20 on 8 August, 29th Bde supporting with CB fire. In a new tactic, 303rd SB's five available howitzers ('A' gun was in the workshops) were aimed at five separate hostile batteries, with several other batteries firing at the same targets, which were thus caught in a crossfire, and any error of line by one firing battery would probably be made up for by another battery. In any case the lines had been carefully laid out by the Field Survey section. The battery fired for five hours, the FOOs reporting excellent results, and met only a feeble response by the German guns. When the hostile batteries were overrun by the attacking infantry, many guns were found to be loaded but unfired, the surrounding position having been destroyed by the British CB fire. While this bombardment continued, Maj Delap went forward at 07.30 with a reconnaissance party, and at 09.00 'E' and 'F' guns moved forwards to positions near Marcelcave, though they were not called upon to fire on the retreating Germans. 'Cease fire' was ordered for the rest of the battery at 09.20 (having fired 828 rounds in the morning), and by 17.00 the FWD tractors were loaded and began hauling the four guns ('A' having returned from the workshop) to join the forward section and move up to west of Wiencourt. From here it fired at the retreating enemy next morning until noon, before advancing to Guillaucourt, where it was not required to fire. Early on 10 August the battery pushed on to Rosières, which had fallen to the Canadians the previous evening. At 08.00 the battery opened fire in support of the Canadian advance, the only heavy battery far enough forward to take part in this attack. Amiens had initially been a stunning success, but the follow-up was poorly coordinated, and the Germans now made a stand in their old 1916 defence line. Fourth Army called a halt to organise a coordinated attack.

During this lull, 303rd SB selected a more advanced position and dumped ammunition there, but it was never used. From 15 August the brigade was ordered to become silent, after which 303rd SB only fired a few rounds at extreme range for registration, observed from an OP in the tower of Rosières church. While waiting, 303rd SB was ordered to form a battery at Folies from captured German guns. Examining the scattered guns that had been overrun in the advance, they found that all the '8-inch' (21 cm) howitzers had been stripped of parts and could not be fired, but the battery secured one '5.9-inch' (15 cm) gun and four 5.9-inch howitzers with ammunition. They borrowed caterpillar tractors to tow them to a position near Méharicourt. A detachment was detailed to man them, and using their own dial sights they fired 100 gun rounds and 500 howitzer rounds. They found the howitzers easy to use but criticised their short range; however they were impressed with the 20,000 yards (18,000 m) range they achieved with the gun. The captured guns were then handed over to Corps HA. On 27 August French troops took over the front line from the Canadians and 29th Bde was pulled out to Cagny, coming under the orders of IX Corps HA.

Canadian Corps had been transferred back to First Army and on 31 August 29th Bde was sent north to rejoin it. 303rd SB moved to Longueau station where that evening battery HQ entrained for Arras with the guns, their detachments and stores, while the remainder went by road with the lorries. The two parties reunited early the following afternoon at Sainte-Catherine, north of Arras. Next morning (2 September) Canadian Corps was due to advance astride the Arras–Cambrai road to assault the formidable Drocourt-Quéant Switch Line (the 'D-Q Line'). Much of the heavy artillery, including the 60-pdrs of 29th Bde, was assigned to CB work and firing on the bridges across the Canal du Nord and the Sensée river. 303rd and 195th SBs were not required until 08.00 when Canadian Corps HA ordered them up to near the fortified village of Dury, which was part of the infantry's first objective (the Red Line). The two battery commanders went forward to reconnoitre gun positions in the open valley beyond Éterpigny. Leaving their car in the latter smashed-up village, the two continued on foot, only to find that the Canadians were held up in front of Dury and infantry fighting was still going on in the valley. They returned to the advanced brigade HQ and reported that there was no question of the heavy artillery going up. They were sent to halt the advancing brigade and get the guns turned round and off the road, a difficult operation, carried out under some shellfire. In the evening 303rd SB pushed 'E' and 'F' guns up to a hollow by the road in case of SOS calls, while the rest went back to Agny for the night. The following morning the advance had progressed, so 'A' and 'B' guns were sent up the Arras–Cambrai road to a position just beyond Haucourt, where they opened fire and were later joined by 'E' and 'F'. The road was still under shellfire and was bombed during the night. On the morning of 4 September 'E' and 'F' guns were pushed on to the crossroads at Villers-lès-Cagnicourt, which became 303rd SB's position for several weeks, known to the men as 'Hell-fire Corner'. Hearing that the 60-pdrs were firing at a crowded railway junction at Aubencheul, and anxious to get his battery off the dangerous Arras–Cambrai road, Maj Delap volunteered to take a section of 6-inch howitzers forward to shell this inviting target. He took 'A' and 'B' guns rapidly past Hell-fire Corner and by tracks across country past Saudemont to an orchard near Rumaucourt. The guns were camouflaged and the section used some well-built German ammunition shelters. At the time they were in front of the field artillery, with just a few infantry outposts between them and the enemy. By the end of the day the Canadians had closed up to the line of the Canal du Nord and there was another pause while preparations were made for an assault crossing. 'C' and 'D' guns were later moved up to the Rumaucourt position, and 'E' and 'F' up to Saudemont. The battery's two positions suffered considerable bombing and shellfire (HE and gas) during the following days, with a number of casualties. At one point the battery wireless set at Hell-fire Corner (used to communicate with observation aircraft and operated by a specially-trained signaller and two air mechanics from the Royal Air Force) intercepted a German wireless message and was able to warn the battery of an imminent bombardment.

=== Canal du Nord to Mons ===
The Allies began a concerted series of offensives all along the Western Front on 26 September. First Army joined in next day with the Battle of the Canal du Nord. Although the canal was incomplete and largely dry on this part of the front, it was still a formidable obstacle, with three strongly-wired trench systems to be overcome. There was no preliminary bombardment, but the heavy artillery had been wire-cutting since 18 September and carried out the usual CB and HF tasks. On 20 September 29th Bde came under the orders of XXII Corps, whose task was to protect the left flank of Canadian Corps as it assaulted the canal in front. This protection was largely by artillery fire, the tasks including CB fire, gas and smoke bombardments on the villages and crossings along the flanking Sensée Canal. The batteries received their targets for the attack at midnight on 26/27 September and opened fire simultaneously at 05.20 next morning. 303rd SB's FOOs watched the progress of the infantry battle from their OP in a sandpit near Saudemont. By 18.00 303rd SB had fired 1300 rounds from its two positions. After the canal crossing 29th Bde remained with XXII Corps for the next two weeks, protecting the left flank of the advance. 303rd SB moved up to Sauchy-Cauchy on the canal bank, where the guns were hidden by the trees and the gunners could re-use some old German bivouacs; Battery HQ remained about a mile back at Rumaucourt. The plan had been for the battery to be silent, but this was abandoned and it continued to fire as many as 1000 shells a day at enemy roads, batteries, dumps and transport. The worn howitzers were sent in turn to the workshops for overhaul. There was little return fire, the German long range guns mainly firing at the bridges being built over the canal. From 10 October Maj Delap was acting commander of 29th Bde, and Maj F.D. Field arrived as temporary OC of 303rd SB.

The Second Battle of Cambrai was fought on 8–11 October, and on 13 October Aubigny-au-Bac on the Sensée Canal, one of 303rd SB's targets, changed hands several times. By 14 October Canadian Corps was anticipating a German retreat. 303rd SB was ordered to send two guns up to the southern edge of Quesnoy Wood to be ready to harass them. The Germans took advantage of bad weather to make their retreat to the River Selle, giving up Douai on 17 October, and although the battery was ordered to stand by it did not open fire. That evening the rest of the guns were brought up from Sauchy-Cauchy and Rumaucourt. The intention had been to cross at Aubigny, but the REs did not have enough bridging material, so the battery had to return north to cross, and then moved on to Cantin for the night. By 21 October 29th Bde had reached Rœulx, where they were greeted by liberated French civilians. The guns came into action next day at the mining village of Haveluy, then moved up to Hérin outside Valenciennes on 24 October. Here it was joined by E.H. Huxford, who had briefly commanded the battery as an acting major in July 1917, and now returned to it as a substantive lieutenant. On 25 October the last of the battery's stores and personnel arrived from Rumaucourt.

First Army had now closed up to the line of the River Scheldt, but the Germans were holding Valenciennes in strength to cover their retreat, and a major operation was required to take the town. Much of the Corps HA was resting, so 29th Bde took on the task of engaging most of the opposing heavy artillery, whose positions were not well known. Canadian and XXII Corps launched their attack (the Battle of Valenciennes) at 05.15 on 1 November. German artillery responded promptly, but their fire fell away as the attack progressed: 29th Bde responded to 59 calls for CB fire during the day and 303rd SB alone fired 1402 rounds. 29th Brigade was firing in support of 4th Canadian Division as it advanced astride the Scheldt across Mont Houy into the south of the town, although the British heavy artillery were not permitted to shell the town itself for fear of harming French civilians sheltering there. Canadian and XXII Corps completed the clearance of the town by nightfall on 2 November. When a counter-attack looked likely in late afternoon, the artillery fired a counter-preparation programme from 16.30 to 17.00 and no attack developed. From his OP Maj Delap was able to bring down the brigade's fire on four hostile batteries and their horse teams supporting an attempted attack on Mont Houy. Counter-attacks were still feared, however, and 29th Brigade fired on its SOS lines again on the morning of 3 November.

The pursuit was now resumed. 303rd SB passed through Valenciennes on 4 November and was billeted with civilians at Marly, where Maj Delap returned from 29th Bde to resume command of the battery. It brought two guns into action in the open near Estreux, which took part in early morning bombardments in support of the Canadian infantry's advance on 5 and 6 November. The other four guns moved up to Rombies and got into action at Rouge Haie Farm, taking part in the 6 November operation. The problem now was moving the guns along muddy roads, made worse by German demolitions. Corps HA supplied a caterpillar tractor to pull out the two guns from Estreux, but it later became bogged itself. The battery parked its guns at Rombies village and went into billets there. On 8 November the battery was ordered forward again, and next day it crossed into Belgium on the road towards Mons. In the late afternoon the battery parked by the road awaiting further orders, and received some shelling from a long-range gun; this was the last time it came under fire. The battery was billeted in Boussu that night and the following day. At 01.15 on 10 November it received orders to advance to the outskirts of Mons with 400 rounds of ammunition and come into action by 06.00 with a telephone line laid to Corps HA. Despite the German destruction of the roads the battery achieved all this in the dark, except the telephone line (it had been given the wrong position for Corps HA). It established its OP in a cafe at a crossroads, surrounded by liberated civilians, later on a mining spoilheap, and awaited orders to fire. It received a few CB targets, then at 15.55 it was given 5 minutes' warning to open with a rolling barrage east of Mons, where the 2nd Canadian Division was fighting its way through Hyon against spirited opposition. By 02.00 on 11 November the Germans had been driven out of Mons, which was entered by 3rd Canadian Division, and hostilities ended at 11.00 when the Armistice with Germany came into effect.

== The Rhine ==
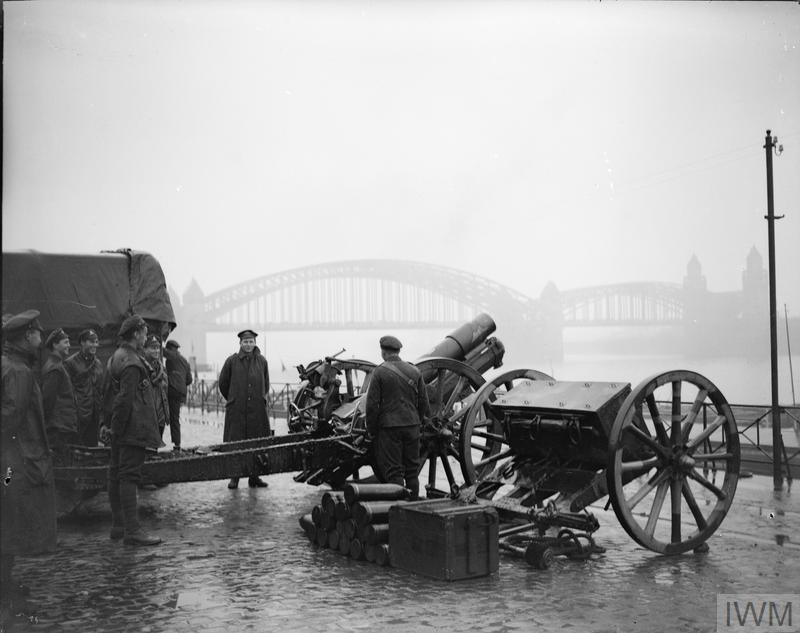
A British 6-inch howitzer 'in action' on the bank of the Rhine at Cologne, 14 December 1919; 303rd SB had taken up a similar position at Bonn two days earlier.

303rd SB was billeted in the Mons suburb of Flénu, where it cleaned its guns and parked them in the yard of the coal mine. 29th Brigade was selected for the advance to the Rhine with Canadian Corps as part of the Allied occupation of the Rhineland. The brigade began its march on 27 November, with 303rd SB leading the column, marching with 5th Canadian Divisional Artillery. The column proceeded by stages across Belgium to Namur, taking over quarters from the evacuating German troops. From here the bad weather contributed to the break-up of the roads, and on occasions the two siege batteries had to send lorries back to obtain sufficient petrol to continue the march. The column crossed the German frontier on 9 December and reached the Rhine at Bonn on 12 December. 303rd SB boasted that its No 1 gun was the first piece of British heavy artillery to reach the Rhine. The guns of 29th Bde were brought 'into action' on either side of the bridge, covering the bridgehead. 2nd Canadian Division marched across the river the next day.

The troops then took up their occupation duties, including manning control points and securing military store dumps. 303rd SB was billeted in Theaterstrasse, close to the riverfront, while 29th Bde HQ and the horsedrawn 60-pdr batteries moved out to Endenich in the suburbs. Major Delap (in his substantive rank of lieutenant) was awarded a Distinguished Service Order (DSO) in the 1919 New Year Honours. In the new year education classes began for men awaiting demobilisation. In late March 1919 303rd SB took its howitzers to the ranges at Wahn near Cologne for calibration shooting, and went back for practice firing with the rest of 29th Bde in June. After the range practice 29th Bde was held at Wahn under the orders of Lancashire Division ready to advance if Germany rejected the peace terms that had been negotiated; 303rd SB was billeted in Buisdorf. However, the Treaty of Versailles was signed, and on 2 July the brigade marched back to Bonn, with 303rd SB quartered at Endenich. Demobilisation continued, and by October 1919 the batteries of 29th Bde only had enough men left to carry out general fatigue duties. On 25 October the brigade was reorganised as a unit of the British Army of the Rhine, but was later disbanded. The remaining cadre of 303rd SB was formally disbanded in 1920.

During its war service 303rd Siege Battery suffered losses of 3 officers and 25 ORs killed or died from wounds, 11 officers and 183 ORs wounded, injured or gassed.
