= Gomiécourt =

- Commune
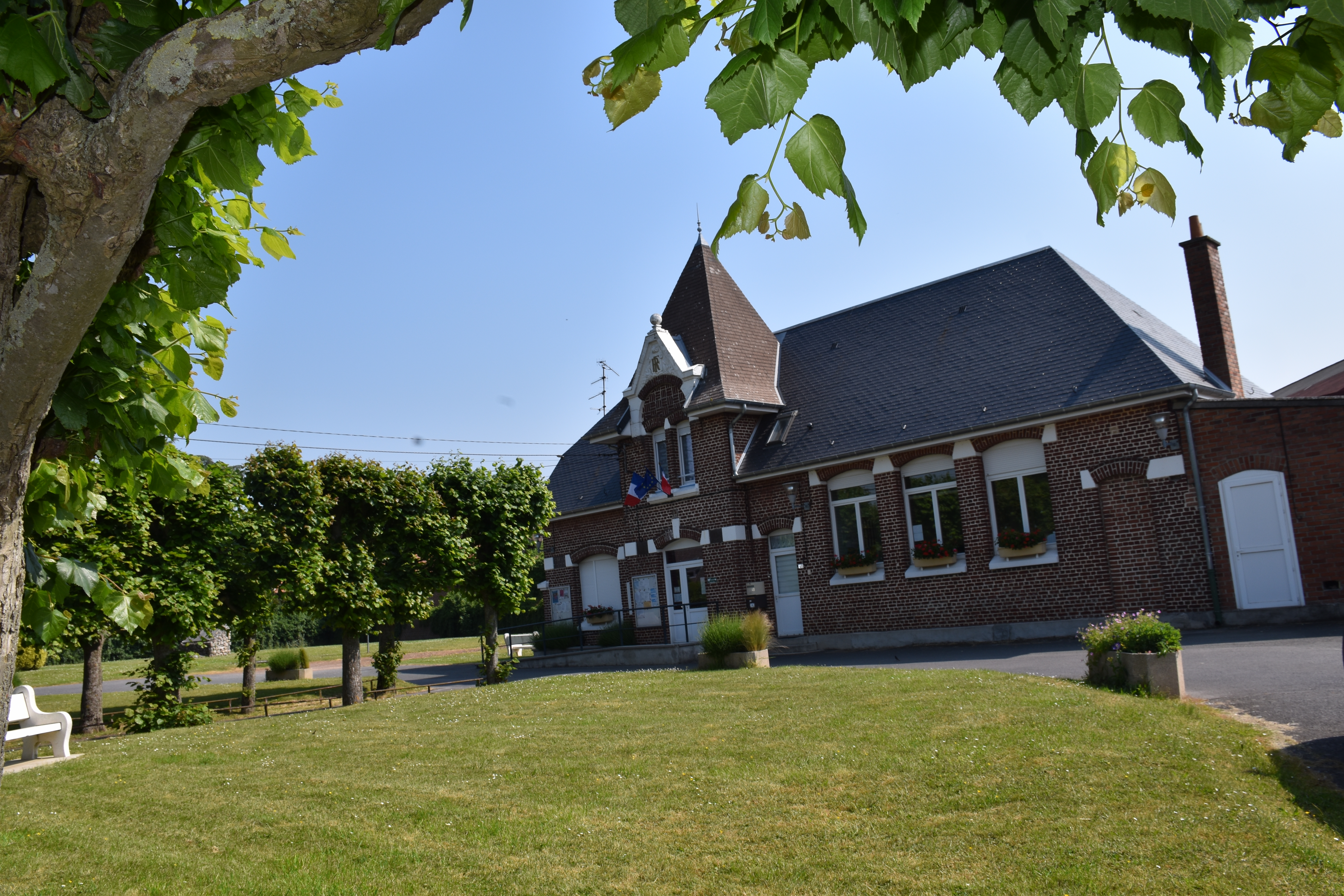
- The town hall of Gomiécourt

- Coat of arms
- Location of Gomiécourt
- Location within France Location within Hauts-de-France
- Coordinates: 50°09′04″N 2°48′02″E
- Country: France
- Region: Hauts-de-France
- Department: Pas-de-Calais
- Arrondissement: Arras
- Canton: Bapaume
- Intercommunality: CC Sud-Artois

Government
  - Mayor (2020–2026): Hervé Copin
- Area^{1}: 3.62 km^{2} (1.40 sq mi)
- Elevation: 117 m (384 ft)
- Highest elevation: 122 m (400 ft)
- Lowest elevation: 94 m (308 ft)
- Population (2023): 151
  - Density: 41.7/km^{2} (108/sq mi)
- Time zone: UTC+01:00 (CET)
  - Summer (DST): UTC+02:00 (CEST)
- INSEE/Postal code: 62374 /62121
- ^{1} French Land Register data, which excludes lakes, ponds, glaciers > 1 km^{2} (0.386 sq mi or 247 acres) and river estuaries.

Gomiécourt (French pronunciation: [ɡɔmjekuʁ]) is a commune in the Pas-de-Calais department in the Hauts-de-France region of France.

== Geography ==
A small farming village situated 10 miles (16 km) south of Arras, at the junction of the D9 and the C9 roads.

== Population ==
Historical population
Year	Pop.	±% p.a.
1968	210	—
1975	170	−2.97%
1982	166	−0.34%
1990	172	+0.44%
1999	169	−0.20%
2007	160	−0.68%
2012	150	−1.28%
2017	156	+0.79%
2023	151	−0.54%
Source: INSEE

== Places of interest ==
- The church of St. Pierre – rebuilt, as was most of the village, after World War I
- The Commonwealth War Graves Commission cemetery

== See also ==
- Communes of the Pas-de-Calais department
