= Ransart, Pas-de-Calais =

Ransart
- Commune
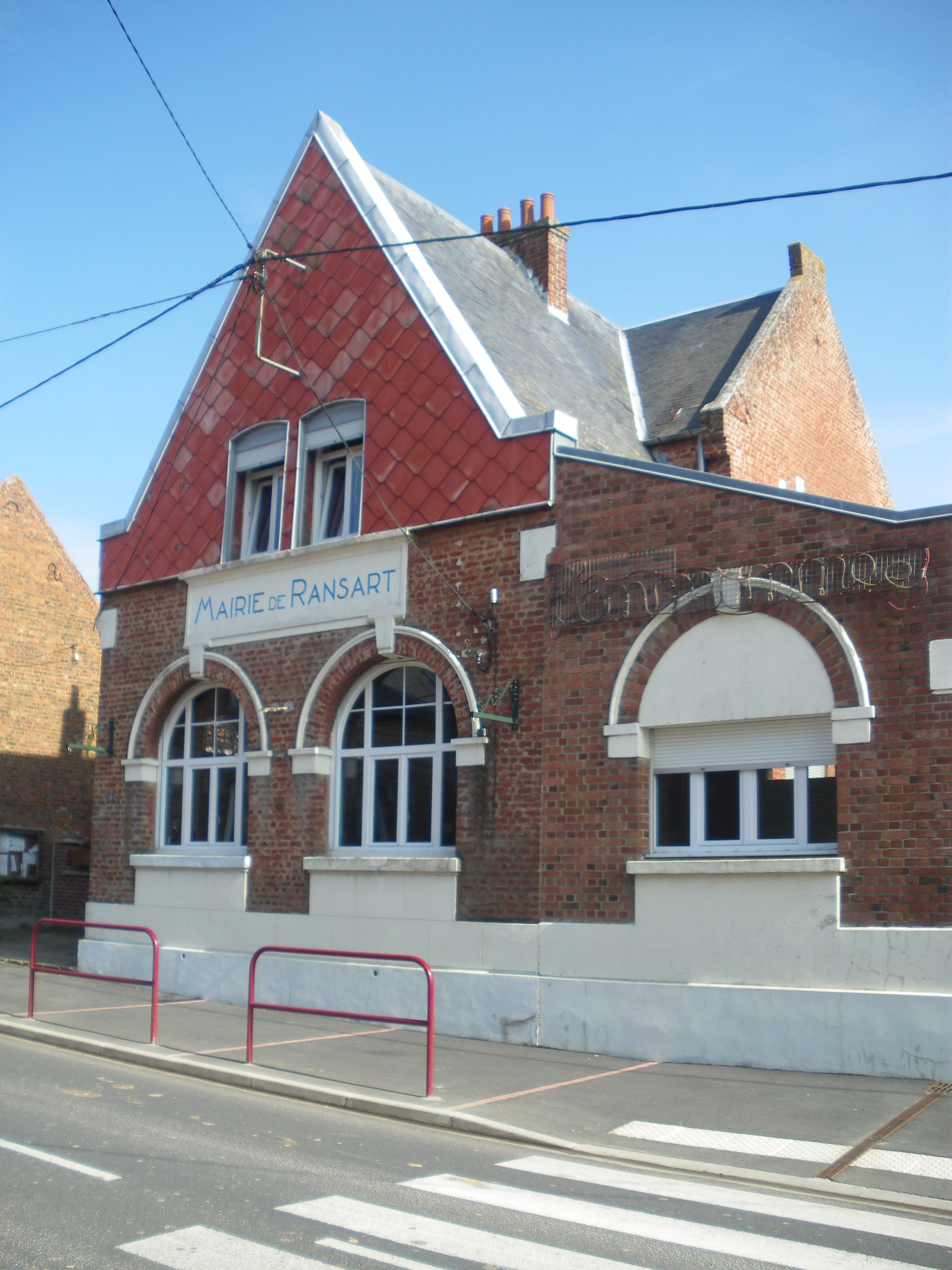
- The town hall of Ransart

- Coat of arms
- Location of Ransart
- Location within France Location within Hauts-de-France
- Coordinates: 50°12′36″N 2°41′12″E
- Country: France
- Region: Hauts-de-France
- Department: Pas-de-Calais
- Arrondissement: Arras
- Canton: Avesnes-le-Comte
- Intercommunality: CU Arras

Government
  - Mayor (2020–2026): Betty Contart
- Area^{1}: 7.45 km^{2} (2.88 sq mi)
- Elevation: 108 m (354 ft)
- Highest elevation: 141 m (463 ft)
- Lowest elevation: 92 m (302 ft)
- Population (2023): 407
  - Density: 54.6/km^{2} (141/sq mi)
- Time zone: UTC+01:00 (CET)
  - Summer (DST): UTC+02:00 (CEST)
- INSEE/Postal code: 62689 /62173
- ^{1} French Land Register data, which excludes lakes, ponds, glaciers > 1 km^{2} (0.386 sq mi or 247 acres) and river estuaries.

Ransart (French pronunciation: [ʁɑ̃saʁ]) is a commune in the Pas-de-Calais department in the Hauts-de-France region of France 8 miles (13 km) southwest of Arras.

== Population ==
Historical population
Year	Pop.	±% p.a.
1968	376	—
1975	346	−1.18%
1982	352	+0.25%
1990	357	+0.18%
1999	374	+0.52%
2007	375	+0.03%
2012	404	+1.50%
2017	404	+0.00%
2023	407	+0.12%
Source: INSEE

== See also ==
- Communes of the Pas-de-Calais department
