= 129th (Bristol) Heavy Battery, Royal Garrison Artillery =

129th (Bristol) Heavy Battery, RGA
- Royal Artillery cap badge
- Active: 22 April 1915–1919
- Country: United Kingdom
- Branch: New Army
- Role: Heavy Artillery
- Size: Battery
- Part of: Royal Garrison Artillery
- Garrison/HQ: Bristol
- Engagements: Battle of Vimy Ridge; Battle of Messines; Third Battle of Ypres; German Spring Offensive; Battle of Albert; Second Battle of Bapaume; Battle of Épehy; Battle of the Canal du Nord; Second Battle of Cambrai; Battle of the Selle; Battle of the Sambre

129th (Bristol) Heavy Battery, Royal Garrison Artillery, was a New Army ('Kitchener's Army') unit of the British Army raised in the City of Bristol in World War I. It was later joined by a contingent recruited from Smethwick in Staffordshire. The battery served with the British Expeditionary Force (BEF) on the Western Front, spending a long period in the Vimy Ridge area, including the 1917 battle, then saw action at Messines and Ypres. It fought against the German Spring Offensive and took part in the Allies' victorious Hundred Days Offensive.

== Recruitment ==
Alfred Leete's recruitment poster for Kitchener's Army.

On 6 August 1914, less than 48 hours after Britain's declaration of war, Parliament sanctioned an increase of 500,000 men for the Regular British Army, and the newly-appointed Secretary of State for War, Earl Kitchener of Khartoum, issued his famous call to arms: 'Your King and Country Need You', urging the first 100,000 volunteers to come forward. This group of six divisions with supporting arms became known as Kitchener's First New Army, or 'K1'. The flood of volunteers overwhelmed the ability of the army to absorb and organise them, and by the time the Fifth New Army (K5) was authorised on 10 December 1914, many of the units were being organised as 'Pals battalions' under the auspices of mayors and corporations of towns up and down the country.

Following their success in raising the 12th (Service) Battalion, Gloucestershire Regiment (Bristol's Own) from August 1914, the Bristol Citizen's Recruiting Committee was authorised by the War Office (WO) on 1 February 1915 to raise a heavy battery of the Royal Garrison Artillery (RGA) in the city. A further battery was authorised on 22 April. These became the 127th (Bristol) and 129th (Bristol) Heavy Batteries under the administration of the General Officer Commanding-in-Chief, Southern Command. These 'local' units were the equivalent of Pals battalions and were not officially taken over by the military authorities until 25 July 1915 (in practice this may not have happened until October).

== Service ==
All the local units suffered from lack of equipment and instructors, which held up training. However, after completing its training, 129th Heavy Bty joined 38th (Welsh) and 120th Heavy Btys to form a new 42nd Heavy Brigade, RGA, at Bordon Camp on 2 March 1916. The brigade was mobilised for overseas service on 8 March and it embarked at Southampton on 27 March for the Western Front where it joined First Army. 129th Heavy Bty established its wagon lines and ammunition column at Béthune while the gunners began improving existing gun positions and dugouts at Annequin. The battery fired its first rounds on 6 April. (Note: It is not clear what guns the battery was issued with, but by June 1916 it had 60-pounders.)

Artillery policy in the BEF was now to redesignate the RGA brigades as 'Heavy Artillery Groups' (HAGs) and to switch batteries between them as required. 129th Heavy Bty was transferred to 3rd HAG on 7 April, then back to 42nd HAG on 22 April.

=== Trench warfare ===
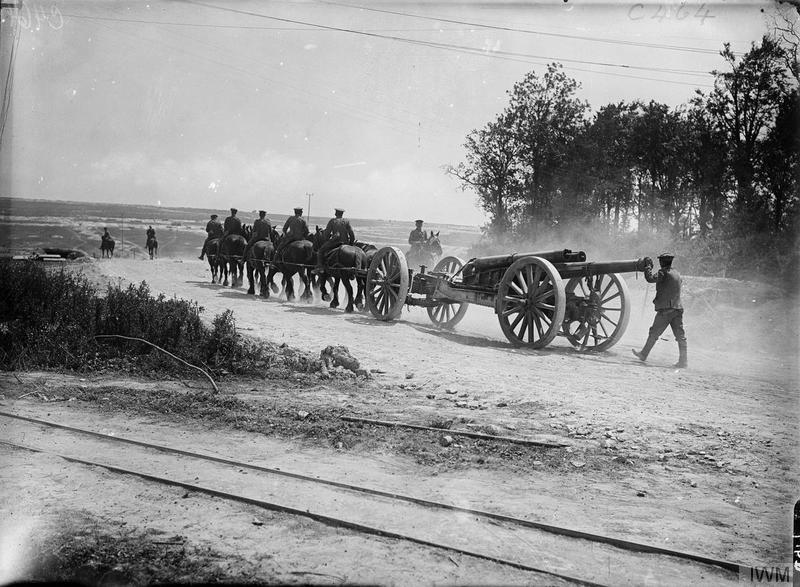
A 60-pounder moving up, 1916.

Meanwhile the battery registered its guns on enemy batteries and on Douvrin, and received a few German shells in return. This counter-battery (CB) fire, sometimes in conjunction with observation aircraft, became the battery's routine. German return fire included both high explosive and gas shells. On 27 April the gun positions round Anneqin were heavily shelled and later enveloped in a gas cloud released from near Loos (part of the action known as the Gas attacks at Hulluch). The battery replied with a vigorous bombardment while the gunners were wearing their gas helmets. The battery positions were shelled again on 29 April, suffering some damage.

On 22 May the battery was transferred to the command of 15th HAG, which was concerned with Vimy Ridge, to the south of Loos, which had recently been taken over from the French Army. Bitter trench warfare was going on here, and the Germans had made a major attack on 22 May. First Army switched additional artillery to this sector ready for a counter-attack, with 129th Heavy Bty firing CB and retaliation tasks, and bombarding the ridge itself, though on occasions one of its guns was unable to get the requisite angle from its positions near Annequin. The fighting at Vimy died down at the end of the month as the BEF concentrated on its preparations for the summer's 'Big Push' (the Battle of the Somme). German artillery on First Army's front was generally quiet during May and June.

By now, 129th Heavy Bty had its four guns disposed into two sections, North and South. The gun that could not achieve the angle had its platform moved and was re-registered. At the end of the month one of the battery's guns was withdrawn to the workshops having fired the maximum number of rounds. On 30 June 15th HAG fired a programme of 'strafes' as part of First Army's diversionary actions to assist the Somme offensive (which was launched next day). Apart from daily CB fire, occasional trench raids in the Vimy or Loos areas, or bombardments against targets such as Vimy Station and La Chaudiere, First Army's front was generally quiet during the summer while the fighting continued on the Somme. However, the battery did suffer some casualties when 15th HAG's observation post (OP) at Notre Dame de Lorette was shelled.

Heavy artillery policy in the BEF was to increase batteries from four to six guns. 129th (Bristol) Heavy Bty was one of the first to benefit when it was made up to six 60-pounders with the arrival of a section from 148th (Smethwick) Heavy Battery on 21 July. This was another New Army 'Local Unit', which had been raised at Smethwick in Staffordshire in 1915 by Lt-Col Ernest Meysey-Thompson, MP. (Note: The unit was one of many New Army 'Local Units' raised by Meysey-Thompson: others included the 164th (Rotherham), 168th (Huddersfield), 175th (Staffordshire) and 176th (Leicestershire) Brigades, Royal Field Artillery, and the 144th (York), 147th (Leicester) and 149th (Wakefield) Heavy Btys, RGA.) Authority for the 148th Hvy Bty was given by the WO on 21 September 1915, and the unit was to be administered by the General Officer Commanding-in-Chief, Northern Command. It went out to the Western Front on 17 July 1916 and joined First Army. On arrival one section was posted to 129th (Bristol) Heavy Bty, and the other to 120th Heavy Bty (also in 15th HAG). Because some batteries had moved south to jojn in the Somme fighting, there were empty gun positions for the new sections to take over.

The quiet routine continued through the autumn and into the winter: 129th Heavy Bty sometimes shelling active anti-aircraft batteries, Minenwerfers, road traffic or working parties, but on some days there was no firing at all.

129th Heavy Bty pulled out of its positions on 27 January 1917, leaving 15th HAG and moving north to join VIII Corps' HA. At this time VIII Corps was in reserve: it formed part of Second Army in the Ypres Salient, but was being held to exploit any breakthrough when First Army launched its planned attack on Vimy Ridge. On 13 February the battery was assigned to 41st HAG, which was concentrating artillery for IX Corps for Second Army's own planned attack at Messines. 129th Heavy Bty registered its guns on Wytschaete Church and 'the brickstacks', and was active in CB and retaliatory fire, but was soon moved out again on 22 February to return to First Army.

=== Vimy Ridge ===
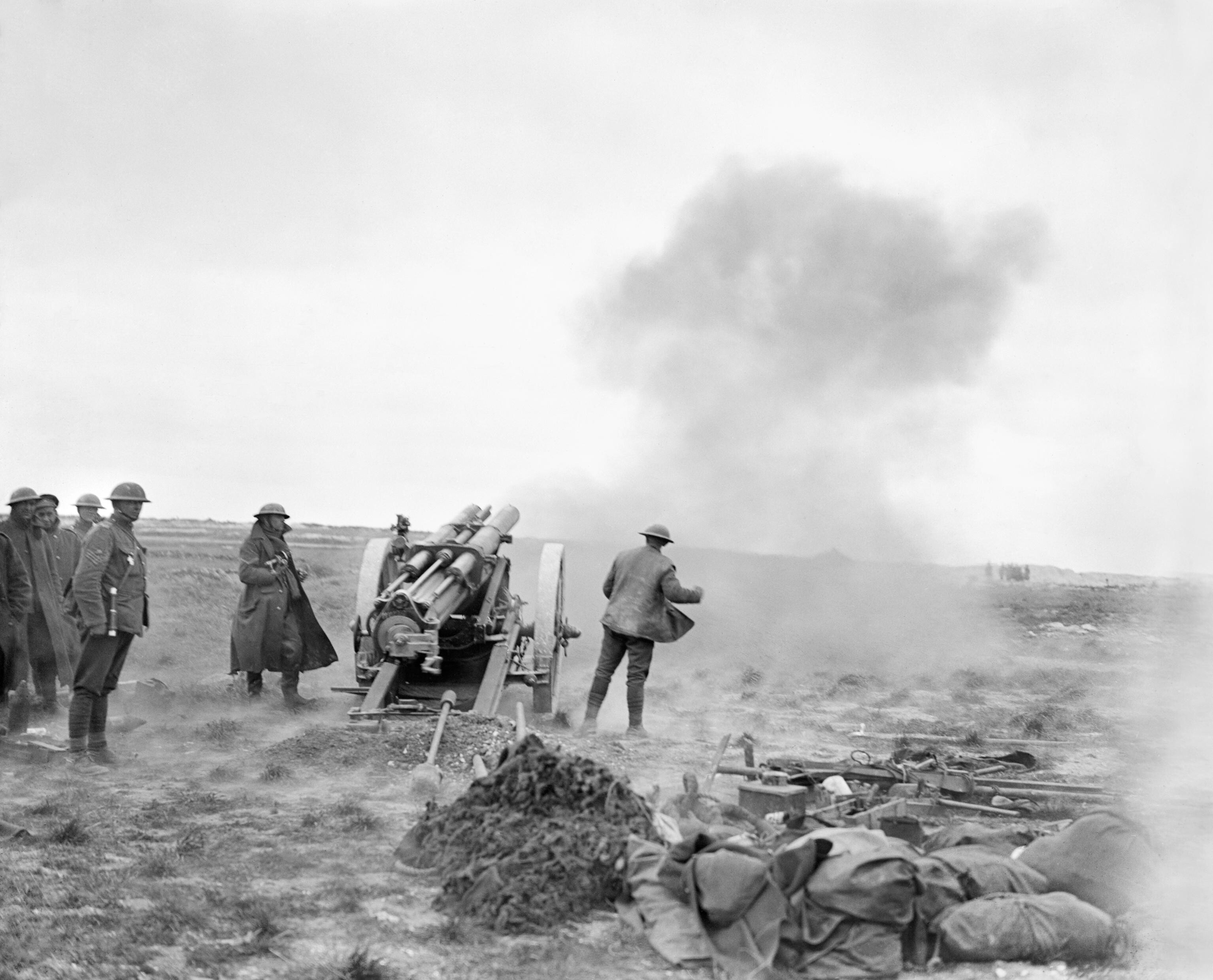
60-pounder firing on the Western Front.

The battery joined 76th HAG on 26 February and got its guns into position on 13 March. The group had just moved out of the Ypres Salient to Mont-Saint-Éloi, supporting the Canadian Corps. Large numbers of enemy batteries were engaged while day and night firing was carried out against the German back areas. First Army was preparing for the Arras Offensive, with the Canadian Corps tasked with taking Vimy Ridge. In the days before the attack (9 April) prodigious quantities of ammunition were expended on enemy trenches, strongpoints, wire and batteries, with 76th HAG paying particular attention to the villages of Thélus, Tilleuls and Vimy. The attack went in at 05.30 with a heavy barrage; while the field artillery fired a creeping barrage in front of the advancing infantry and the heavy howitzers fired a standing barrage on each objective in turn. Meanwhile, the 60-pdrs 'swept' and 'searched' in depth to catch enemy machine guns and moving infantry. With this support the Canadians overran three lines of German trenches and seized the crest of the ridge. Now 76th HAG was able to establish four observation posts (OPs) on the ridge and directly observe its targets.

As the Germans fell back, the 60-pdr batteries moved into forward positions, then on 19 April 129th Heavy Bty moved four guns to Tilleuls, beyond the old German front line and just behind the crest of the ridge. From here it engaged the enemy, though it suffered a few casualties of its own. On 23 April (the Second Battle of the Scarpe) the batteries supported the attacks against La Coulotte (Canadian Corps) and Gavrelle (63rd (Royal Naval) Division), and then on 28 April the Canadians captured Arleux while 76th HAG's batteries engaged 65 hostile batteries and fired at opportunity targets such as enemy troops massing for counter-attacks. Fresnoy was captured on 3 May but the Arras offensive made less progress as the weeks went by, although 76th HAG's batteries continued their neutralisation tasks against hostile batteries, and night harassing fire (HF) on roads.

=== Messines ===
76th HAG pulled out on 14 May and moved with its batteries to Kemmel, where it came under Second Army. 129th Heavy Bty, now under Maj Chapman, began preparing positions but on 26 May it transferred to the command of 57th HAG. On the evening of 27 May the group supported a trench raid by 16th (Irish) Division, then on 31 May it began bombarding 'special targets' in connection with the forthcoming attack on the Messines Ridge. This activity reached a crescendo in early June, with the guns participating in practice barrages and wire-cutting. The bombardment continued with the systematic destruction of enemy defences until the assault went in at 03.10 on 7 June, following the explosion of huge mines. 57th HAG supported the assault by IX Corps, which rushed the village of Wyteschaete with ease. The results of the limited attack were spectacular, with the whole ridge being captured. At 18.00 the same day 129th Heavy Bty was ordered to pull out its guns and transfer to 92nd HAG.

=== Ypres ===
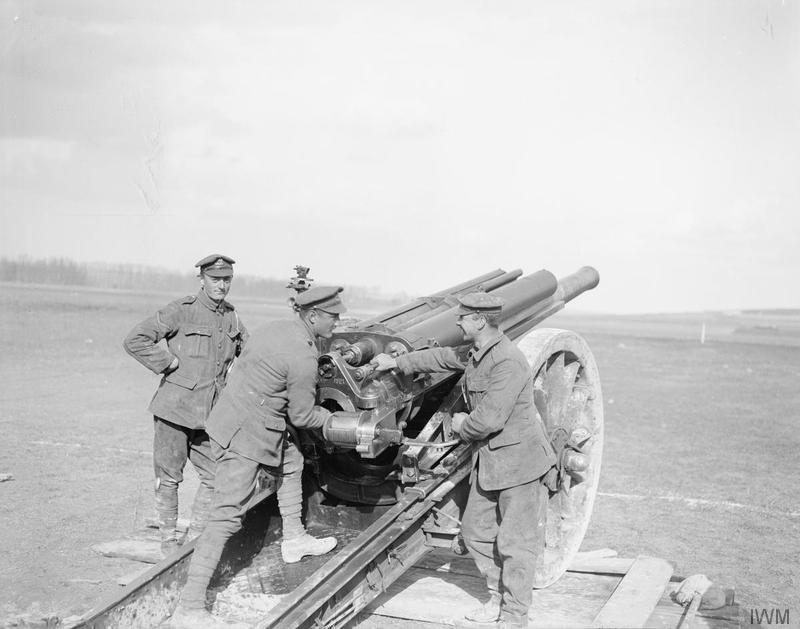
Loading a 60-pounder.

92nd HAG and some of its batteries were on their way from the Somme to the Ypres Salient, where they were to join Fifth Army. The advance parties arrived next day at Poperinge. The group shared its HQ with 85th HAG; they were organised as V Group (siege batteries under 85th HAG) and W Group (60-pdr batteries including 129th Heavy Bty under 92nd HAG). Fifth Army was preparing for the Third Ypres Offensive with a huge artillery concentration. 92nd HAG/W Group was detailed as Right, or Southern, Counter Battery (Gun) Group. Firing had been going on since 12 June, but 92nd HAG was ordered to stay silent from 7 to 14 July. The full bombardment then began on 15 July. As well as numerous neutralising CB shoots, the 60-pdrs also shelled the crossings of the Steenbeek stream, the main Torhout railway, and various tracks, roads and crossings with shrapnel. Zero hour for the first phase of the offensive (the Battle of Pilckem Ridge was 03.50 on 31 July. The night before, 92nd HAG's batteries fired gas shells into five known German battery positions until 5 minutes before Zero. XIV Corps' attack in front of 92nd HAG was successful, despite heavy casualties, with Guards and 38th (Welsh) Divisions advancing from their positions along the Yser Canal, pushing through Pilckem to their third objective and taking up a line along the Steenbeek. However, the attacks further south had been less successful, and during the afternoon heavy rain set in, flooding the Steenbeek.

In the days after the attack, the group continued with its bombardment of crossings and CB work. Resumption of the offensive on XIV Corps' front was delayed until 16 August (the Battle of Langemarck), when the infantry (20th (Light) and 29th Divisions) pushed out of the Steenbeek Valley to capture Langemarck itself. This was an isolated success on an otherwise unsuccessful day, but it allowed 92nd HAG to move its batteries across the Yser Canal. A further attack on this front on 27 August was a failure. The poor weather prevented much air observation, though the ammunition expenditure during the August battles had been so great that it had to be limited.

The offensive was renewed on 20 September with the Battle of the Menin Road Ridge. The new tactics emphasised stepwise attacks, allowing time for the heavy artillery to carry out CB tasks and to destroy concrete emplacements. 92nd HAG participated in a practice barrage the day before, and then in a barrage and neutralising CB fire during the attack, in which XIV Corps played a minor role. XIV Corps was not directly involved in the next advance (the Battle of Polygon Wood, 26 September) but 92nd HAG supported the neighbouring XVIII Corps with CB fire. German night bombers persistently attacked Fifth Army's rear area, and the wagon lines of 92nd HAG's batteries suffered badly.

The Battle of Broodseinde on 4 October saw XIV Corps' left-hand division gain its limited objectives with very little opposition. The Battle of Poelcappelle on 9 October also went well for XIV Corps, but the worsening conditions led to failure further south. The heavy batteries had to lend their horses to drag the siege guns forward, and once over the Pilckem Ridge they were under direct enemy observation and fire from beyond the Steenbeek and from Houthulst Forest. By the time the attack was renewed on 12 October (the First Battle of Passchendaele) guns and ammunition were sinking in the mud, bombardments were thin and inaccurate, and CB fire had almost ceased, while the gunners continued to suffer casualties from enemy high explosive and gas shelling. XIV Corps attacked in Houthulst Forest on 22 October with poor results. It made another attempt (the Second Battle of Passchendaele) on 26 October, but the infantry struggling through the mud failed to take their objectives. Two days later XIV Corps HQ was transferred to the Italian Front and XIX Corps took over that portion of the front, but the fighting dragged on, with 92nd HAG providing CB fire support as XVIII Corps attacked again on 30 October. Unlike some of the other batteries, 129th Heavy Bty had not been relieved during this intense campaign, but it was given few tasks during October and may have been at rest for part of the month. On 3/4 November it was relieved by 139th (Hampstead) Heavy Bty.

=== Winter 1917–18 ===
Captain Dugdale led the gunners of 129th Heavy Bty south, back to First Army where they came under the command of 83rd HAG. They took over four guns and moved them into positions at Thélus relinquished by 116th Heavy Bty. 129th Heavy Bty's drivers and horses followed later. The sector was relatively active, with wire-cutting for trench raids as well as CB work, though the group was reorganising its guns and positions. 49th HAG moved into the sector on 18 December and took over 129th Heavy Bty, at which time the battery was only manning two guns. Under the new HQ the 60-pdrs continued with HF tasks. Periodically 129th Heavy Bty fired to disperse enemy working parties.

In late 1917, the BEF changed its heavy artillery policy, and HAGs became permanent brigades; 49th HAG changed its title on 1 January 1918. On 13 January 129th Heavy Bty, now commanded by Maj W.Michael, rejoined 92nd HAG, now designated as 92nd (Mobile) Brigade, RGA, composed of four six-gun batteries of 60-pounders. For the rest of the war 129th (Bristol) Heavy Bty served alongside 127th (Bristol) Heavy Bty as well as 14th Heavy Bty and 1/1st Kent Heavy Bty.

The brigade was in GHQ Reserve at Barlin, where 129th Heavy Bty joined it on 13 January 1918. The batteries dug positions and emplaced the guns, but they were not manned; in view of the expected German offensive the gunners began constructing alternative positions and reconnoitring fall-back positions. From 25 February the brigade was at 24 hours' notice to move if required.

=== Spring Offensive ===
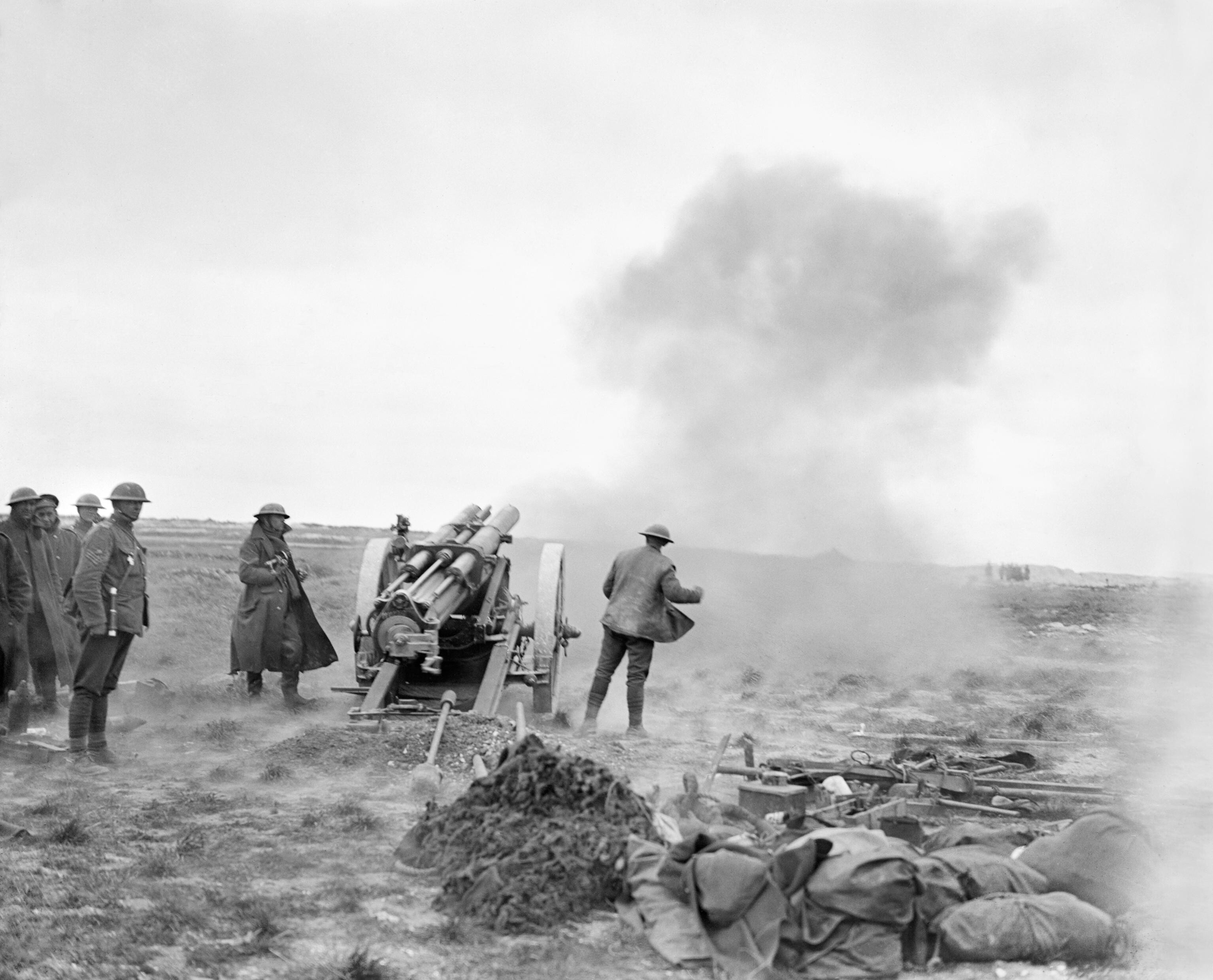
60-pounder firing during the German Spring Offensive

The Germans launched their Spring Offensive on 21 March 1918. 92nd (M) Brigade was sent up from GHQ Reserve that afternoon to reinforce the hard-pressed Third Army, and remained with it until the Armistice with Germany. The column reached Bucquoy at 13.00 on 23 March, coming under IV Corps' HA to support 6th Division. The batteries took up positions at Bihucourt that evening and opened fire against the advancing Germans next day to assist 41st Division. However, that afternoon they were ordered to retire: Bapaume was being evacuated, the 'Great Retreat' had begun and the roads were very congested. The batteries withdrew through Bucquoy, taking up a number of short-lived positions, and came into action astride the Foncquevillers–Souastre road on the evening of 26 March. Operations in this sector now quietened down. At first the batteries of 92nd Bde were in the open, to engage over open sights any enemy crossing the Hébuterne ridge, but as the Germans did not get that far the guns were withdrawn behind a crest to hide their flashes. From these positions the guns did a great deal of CB work and 'road strafes'.

On 5 April the Germans launched a new phase of their offensive (the Battle of the Ancre) and the battery positions were bombarded for five hours with shells of all calibres, but remained in action all the time. German accounts refer to the 'strong reaction' they received from the British artillery, and their attacks made little headway, ending the offensive on this front. Thereafter most engagements were at extreme range, which wore out the guns and carriages. The brigade concentrated on CB and night firing. Because some of the batteries were kept silent and hidden, the workload on 129th Heavy Bty was increased. It increased further in July as other brigades were withdrawn to prepare for that summer's offensive, leaving the four batteries of 92nd Bde as the only 60-pdrs on IV Corps' front, carrying out CB and HF tasks as Third Army harassed the enemy with raids.

=== Hundred Days Offensive ===
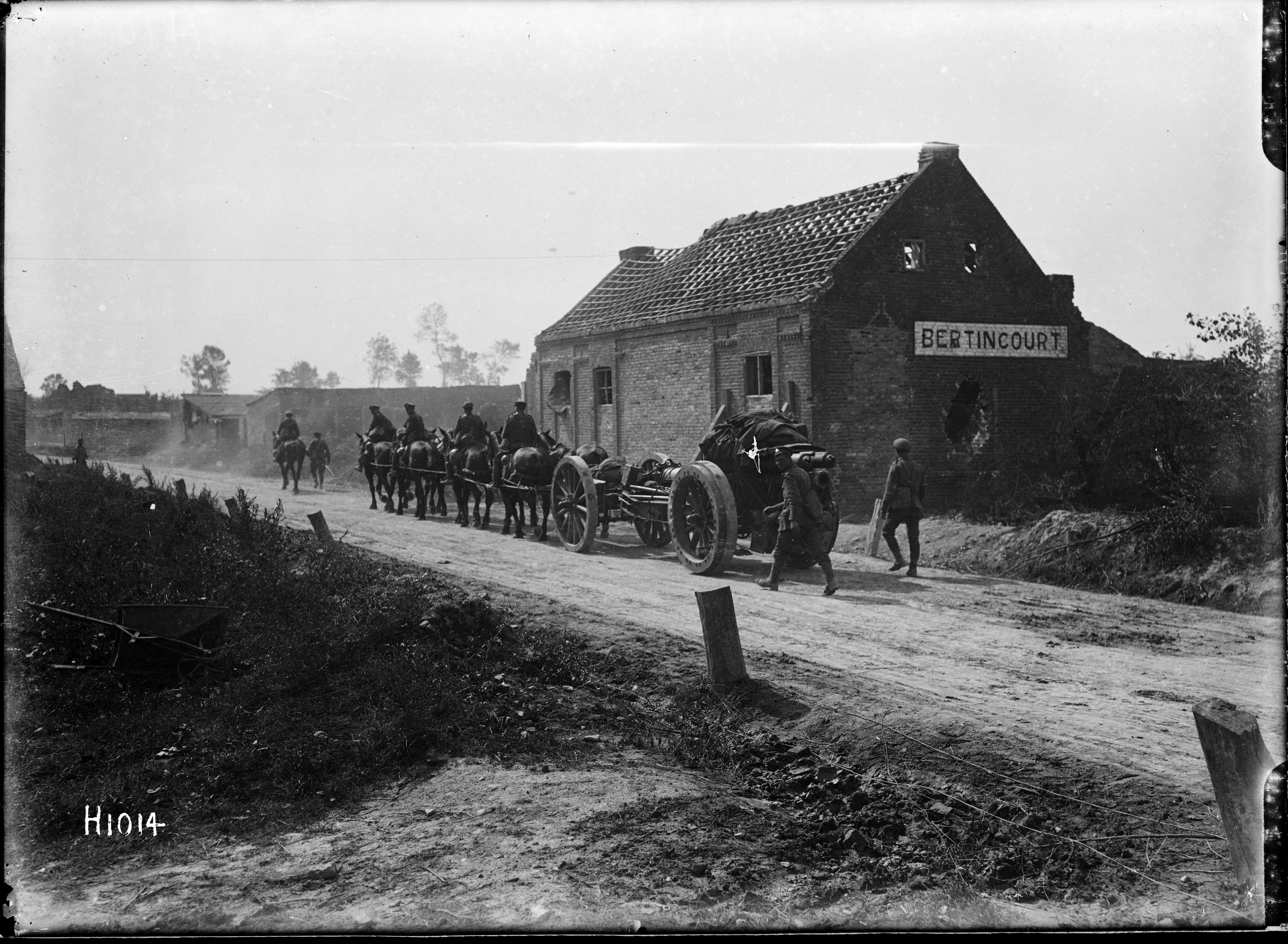
A 60-pounder moving up in September 1918.

After the German offensives were halted, the Allies went over to the attack in their own Hundred Days Offensive. Third Army joined in at the Battle of Albert, beginning on 21 August. From Zero hour (04.55) 92nd Brigade's batteries carried out CB fire for 3 hours, then pulled their guns out and advanced through forward-moving traffic to fresh positions behind Bucquoy. By the end of August the batteries were just south of Favreuil, as the mobile warfare continued with the Battle of the Scarpe. The impetus was renewed with the Second Battle of Bapaume, beginning on 31 August. Enemy shelling and bombing was not heavy, and the batteries suffered only light casualties. On 3 September the Germans retreated and the batteries were on the move again, through Frémicourt and Vélu Wood, Ruyaulcourt, and Neuville-Bourjonval (14 September). The advance now paused because the Germans were back in their Hindenburg Line positions. There was severe artillery fire on both sides. On 18 September Third Army participated in the Battle of Épehy to capture the last outposts in front of the Hindenburg Line, with the 60-pdrs contributing neutralising fire on enemy batteries.

The Allies now carried out a series of attacks all along the Western Front, with Third Army launching the Battle of the Canal du Nord on 27 September. Over the following days 92nd Bde moved its batteries up to Gonnelieu, where it received a good deal of retaliatory fire, and then to Gouzeaucourt. By now the batteries were positioned in the old Hindenburg Line. Zero hour for Third Army's next attack, the Second Battle of Cambrai, was at 04.30 on 8 October, when 92nd Bde provided CB fire for IV Corps' attack. Soon the batteries were struggling over the St Quentin Canal as they moved up to new positions as Third Army broke through the Beaurevoir Line and pursued the Germans towards the River Selle.

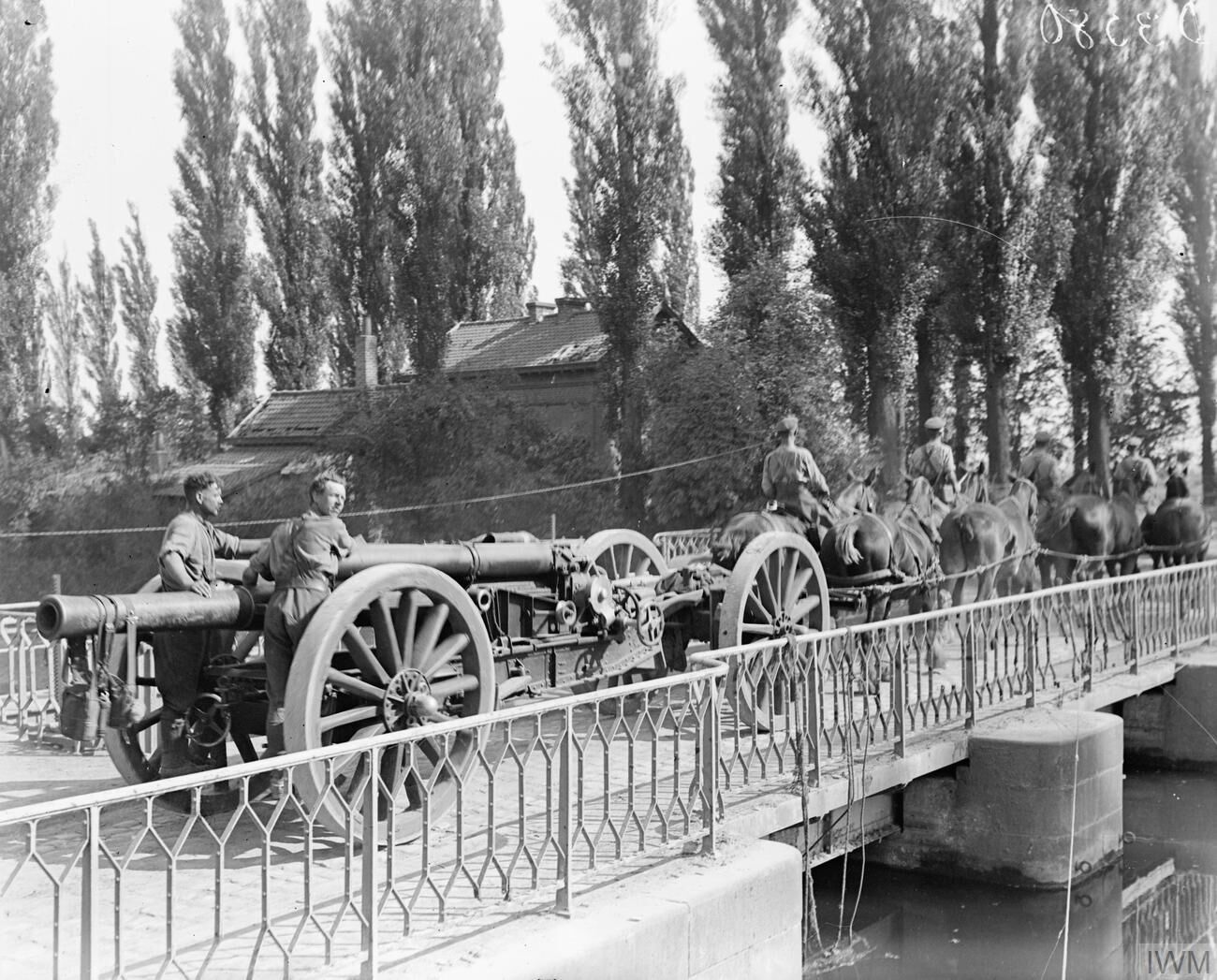
A 60-pounder gun crossing a bridge in September 1918.

There was another pause as the BEF prepared to cross the Selle. 92nd Brigade's batteries continued CB and harassing fire. For the Battle of the Selle there was no long preliminary bombardment, instead a surprise attack was made at 02.00 on 20 October under a full moon, the infantry crossing the river and capturing Solesmes. After firing their CB tasks the batteries quickly moved up, and they crossed the Selle on 22 October. During the October and November fighting heavy guns were not used on the towns, to avoid casualties among French civilians, but the 60-pounders were used to 'search' roads and forest clearings. The BEF's last set-piece action was the Battle of the Sambre on 4 November, in which 92nd Bde supported IV Corps with a complex fire programme. By 8 November the Germans were out of range and there were no bridges over the Sambre capable of taking a 60-pdr. Hostilities ended on 11 November when the Armistice with Germany came into force.

== Postwar ==
On 14 November 92nd Bde concentrated at Salesches and on 20 November it began a long march into Germany, where it was to form part of the British Army of the Rhine. It reached Merode on 20 December, with 129th Heavy Bty billeted nearby in Geich and Obergeich. Here early demobilisation of coalminers and other 'pivotal men' began. By 4 January 1919 the brigade was billeted in Niederzier. On 24 March 129th Heavy Bty moved to Godesburg and joined 84th Bde. Training continued, with the brigade firing on the Hahn Ranges from 27 May to 20 June, after which 129th Heavy Bty moved to Plittersdorf in Bonn. By now demobilisation was reducing the batteries to cadres, and 129th (Bristol) Heavy Battery was disbanded later in 1919.

Under '129th Heavy Bty' the Commonwealth War Graves Commission (CWGC) lists 29 men who died. and a further four names under '129th (Bristol) Heavy Bty'. but other fatal casualties for the battery may have been listed simply under 'RGA'.
