= 127th (Bristol) Heavy Battery, Royal Garrison Artillery =

127th (Bristol) Heavy Battery, RGA
- Royal Artillery cap badge
- Active: 1 February 1915–1919
- Country: United Kingdom
- Branch: New Army
- Role: Heavy Artillery
- Size: Battery
- Part of: Royal Garrison Artillery
- Garrison/HQ: Bristol
- Engagements: Battle of the Somme; Defence of Nieuport; German Spring Offensive; Battle of Albert; Second Battle of Bapaume; Battle of Épehy; Battle of the Canal du Nord; Second Battle of Cambrai; Battle of the Selle; Battle of the Sambre

127th (Bristol) Heavy Battery, Royal Garrison Artillery, was a New Army ('Kitchener's Army') unit of the British Army raised in the City of Bristol in World War I. It served on the Western Front from 1916 to 1918, supporting different formations of the British Expeditionary Force (BEF). It participated in the Battle of the Somme, served on the Flanders coast and against the German Spring Offensive, and took part in the Allies' victorious Hundred Days Offensive.

== Recruitment ==
Alfred Leete's recruitment poster for Kitchener's Army.

On 6 August 1914, less than 48 hours after Britain's declaration of war, Parliament sanctioned an increase of 500,000 men for the Regular British Army, and the newly appointed Secretary of State for War, Earl Kitchener of Khartoum, issued his famous call to arms: 'Your King and Country Need You', urging the first 100,000 volunteers to come forward. This group of six divisions with supporting arms became known as Kitchener's First New Army, or 'K1'. The flood of volunteers overwhelmed the ability of the army to absorb and organise them, and by the time the Fifth New Army (K5) was authorised on 10 December 1914, many of the units were being organised as 'Pals battalions' under the auspices of mayors and corporations of towns up and down the country.

Following their success in raising the 12th (Service) Battalion, Gloucestershire Regiment (Bristol's Own) from August 1914, the Bristol Citizen's Recruiting Committee was authorised by the War Office on 1 February 1915 to raise a heavy battery of the Royal Garrison Artillery (RGA) in the city. A further battery was authorised on 22 April. These became the 127th (Bristol) and 129th (Bristol) Heavy Batteries under the administration of the General Officer Commanding-in-Chief, Southern Command. These 'local' units were the equivalent of Pals battalions and were not officially taken over by the military authorities until 25 July 1915 (in practice this may not have been until October).

== Service ==
All the local units suffered from lack of equipment and instructors, which held up training. However, after completing its training, 127th Heavy Bty went out to the Western Front in May 1916 and joined II Corps' Heavy Artillery (HA) on 29 May. (Note: It is not clear what guns the battery was issued with, but other heavy batteries arriving from the UK at this time had 60-pounders.) II Corps formed part of Second Army in the Ypres sector. The battery was assigned to 12th Heavy Artillery Group (HAG) at Le Bizet near Ploegsteert ('Plug Street') and began preparing gun positions. 12th HAG HQ soon moved away, but 127th Heavy Bty remained in position, taking part in the usual firing associated with trench warfare. On 2 August D Subsection took over an old 4.7-inch gun from 110th Heavy Bty and emplaced it in a forward position at 'Mountain Gun Farm'. From here they used it to shell the winch of a German Kite balloon. On 9 August the forward gun position was involved in a burst of heavy enemy shelling on Le Bizet that caused 60 casualties in the neighbouring Machine Gun Corps unit.

=== Somme ===
On 25 August the battery and its ammunition column entrained at Steenwerck and were taken via Calais to reinforce Fourth Army in the Somme sector. At midnight on 27 August it took over 90th Heavy Bty's 60-pounder guns in position in the Fricourt Valley. It came under 22nd HAG, which was supporting III Corps in the continuing fighting of the Somme Offensive.

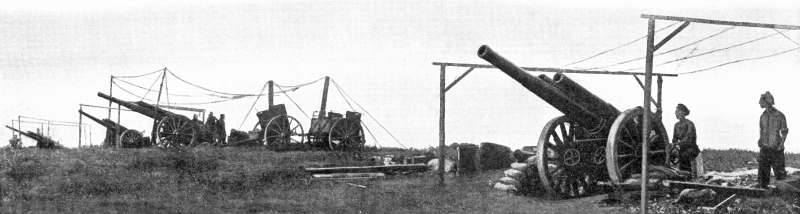
A battery of 60-pounders deployed on the Somme, 1916.

22nd HAG was shooting in support of III Corps' Attacks on High Wood, mainly counter-battery (CB) fire with observation by the Royal Flying Corps. 127th Heavy Bty supported 24th Division's attacks of 3 and 8 September, in the course of which 22nd HAG HQ was relieved by 44th (South African) HAG. The battery participated in the Battle of Flers–Courcelette on 15 September, when III Corps completed the capture of High Wood and Martinpuich, but on the night of 27 September the battery's horse lines were bombed by a German aircraft. On 30 September the battery's officer commanding (OC), Major H.W.K. Wait, and second-in-command were posted elsewhere and Lieutenant Arthur Marnham took over command. Marnham had been commissioned into the London Heavy Brigade of the Territorial Force on the outbreak of war; he was promoted to captain at the end of October 1916. On the night of 6 October the battery occupied a new position at Bazentin-le-Petit, but the new wagon line were shelled and had to be moved again. All through the autumn the fighting continued, ending in the Battle of the Ancre (13–18 November).

=== Spring 1917 ===
The front was rearranged at the end of the year. XV Corps took over part of the line from the French Army and 18th HAG HQ was brought in to command the heavy artillery moving into the French gun positions; 127th Siege Bty joined it at Le Forest on 2 December. 18th HAG was a CB group, but also fired on trenches, villages and woods when enemy troops were noted. Apart from occasional trench raids the sector was generally quiet.

The policy was to increase heavy batteries from a strength of four to six guns and on 23 January 1917 127th Heavy Bty was joined by a section from 203rd Heavy Bty. This battery, one of the last to be authorised, had been formed at Woolwich on 24 June 1916, but had been broken up on arrival in France; the other two sections went to 17th and 124th (2nd Hull) Heavy Btys.

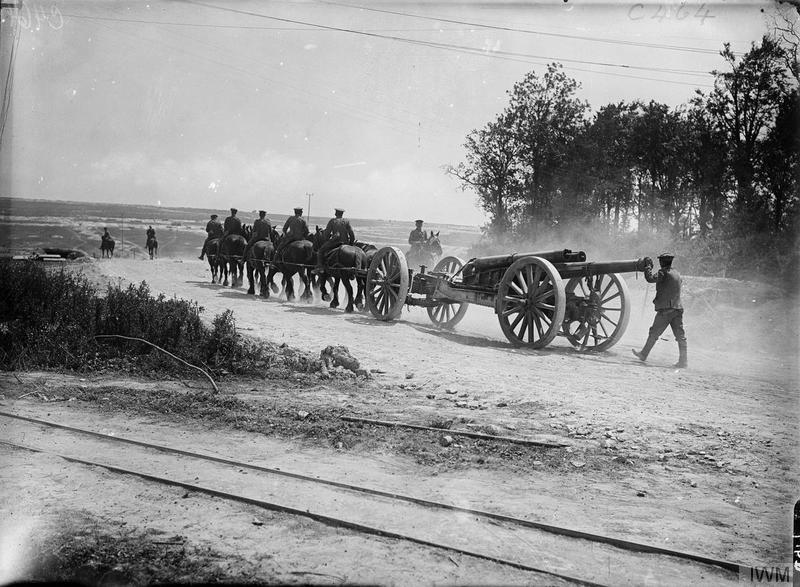
A 60-pounder moving up, 1916.

From 25 February, information from prisoners and trench raids indicated that the Germans in front of Fourth Army were preparing to withdraw to the Hindenburg Line (Operation Alberich). This began on XV Corps front on 14 March, but 18th HAG was moved north for the Arras Offensive so on 17 March 21st HAG took over a number of batteries, including 127th Heavy Bty, for the mobile operations following the German retreat. The guns fired on targets such as Heudecourt as XV Corps closed up to the Hindenburg Line outposts, and then took up positions near Heudecourt.

On 2 June 21st HAG handed over its batteries to 89th HAG under III Corps. The sector facing the Hindenburg Line was relatively quiet, but the batteries exchanged occasional CB fire with the enemy. 127th Heavy Bty spent some time finding suitable observation posts (OPs) for new batteries moving into the area.

=== Nieuport ===
On 27 June the battery received advance orders to move and on 6 July it entrained at Ytres to rejoin XV Corps, which had been relocated with Fourth Army to Nieuport on the Flanders Coast. The BEF's next planned operation was the Flanders Offensive, aiming to break through at Ypres, with a follow-up attack by Fourth Army along the coast supported by amphibious landings (Operation Hush). 127th Heavy Bty detrained and joined 49th HAG at Oostduinkerke on 8 July, getting its first section into position on 10 July while an intense German bombardment was under way. This was part of a spoiling attack that captured the British front line trenches and pushed the infantry back over the canal. Over the following months the two 60-pdr batteries of the group, 127th and 1/1st London Heavy Btys engaged in the usual routine of registering and firing CB tasks and responding to SOS calls from the infantry. Occasional harassing fire (HF) bursts were fired at night on roads used by the enemy. Operation Hush was cancelled due to the lack of progress at Ypres, but 127th Heavy Bty remained on the coast until December. By then the opposing German batteries that dangerously enfiladed the British front had been completely destroyed or continually neutralised, conversely 49th HAG had attracted the fire of around 20 and sometimes as many as 40–50 enemy batteries without being silenced.

=== Winter 1917–18 ===
49th HAG began pulling out its guns into reserve during November as XV Corps prepared to leave and hand over to the Belgian Army. 127th Heavy Bty left for X Corps' Heavy Artillery on 2 December, joining on 6 December. It spent most of December resting and refitting. It was ordered to join 92nd HAG at Thérouanne on 27 December.

In late 1917, the BEF changed its heavy artillery policy, and HAGs became permanent brigades. 92nd HAG was now designated as 92nd (Mobile) Brigade, RGA, composed of four six-gun batteries of 60-pounders: for the rest of the war 127th (Bristol) Heavy Bty served alongside 129th (Bristol) Heavy Bty as well as 14th Heavy Bty and 1/1st Kent Heavy Bty.

The brigade was in GHQ Reserve, with 127th Heavy Bty moving to Gouy-Servins in mid-January 1918. The batteries dug positions and emplaced the guns, but they were not manned; in view of the expected German offensive the gunners began constructing alternative positions and reconnoitring fall-back positions. From 25 February the brigade was at 24 hours' notice to move if required.

=== Spring Offensive ===
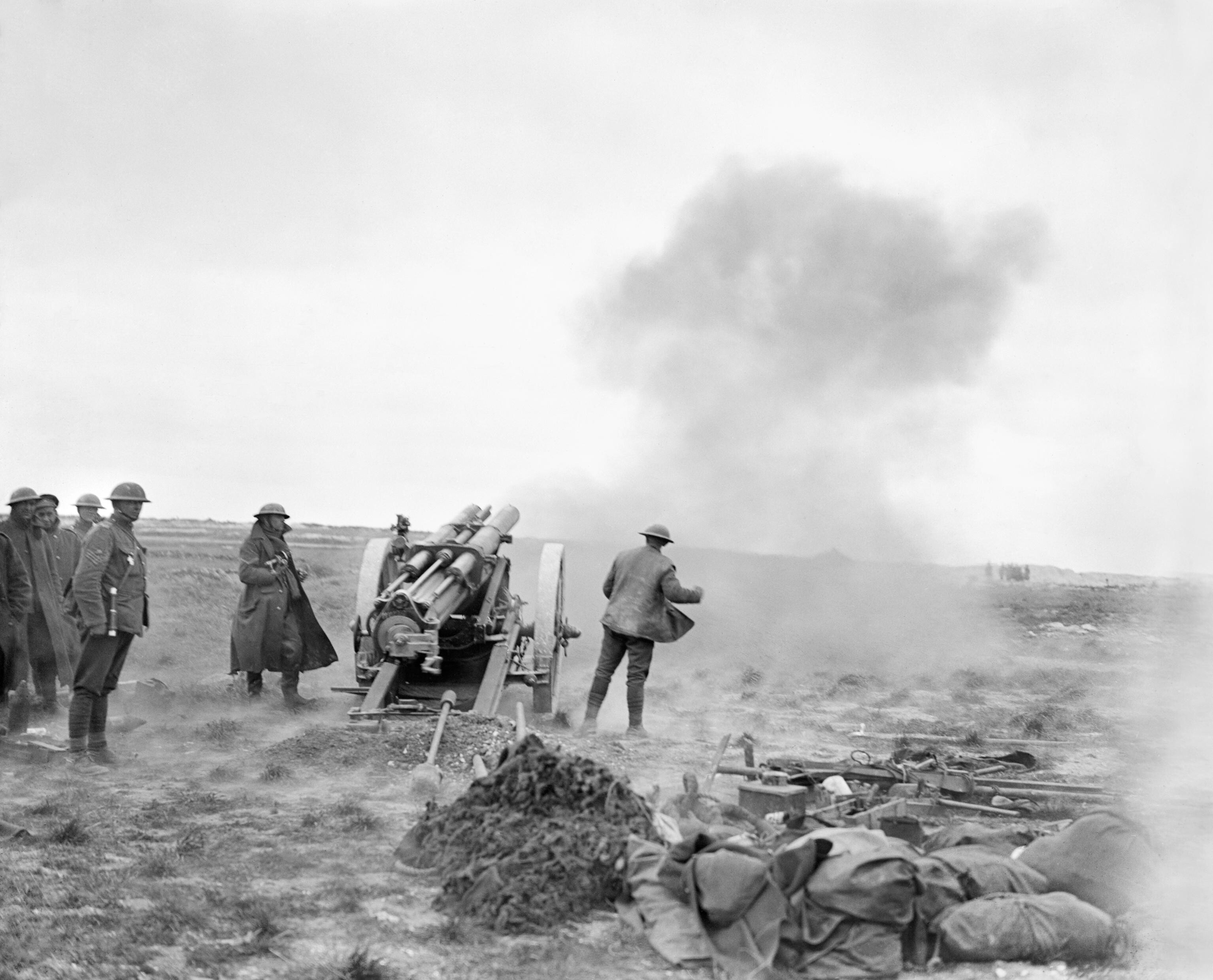
60-pounder firing during the German Spring Offensive

The Germans launched their Spring Offensive on 21 March 1918. 92nd (M) Brigade was sent up from GHQ Reserve that afternoon to reinforce the hard-pressed Third Army, and remained with it until the Armistice with Germany. The column reached Bucquoy at 13.00 on 23 March, coming under IV Corps' HA to support 6th Division. The batteries took up positions at Bihucourt that evening and opened fire against the advancing Germans next day, in support of 41st Division. However, that afternoon they were ordered to retire: Bapaume was being evacuated, the 'Great Retreat' had begun and the roads were very congested. The batteries withdrew through Bucquoy, taking up a number of short-lived positions, and came into action astride the Foncquevillers–Souastre road on the evening of 26 March. Operations in this sector now quietened down. At first the batteries of 92nd Bde were in the open, to engage over open sights any enemy crossing the Hébuterne ridge, but as the Germans did not get that far the guns were withdrawn behind a crest to hide their flashes. From these positions the guns did a great work of CB fire and 'road strafes'.

On 5 April the Germans launched a new phase of their offensive (the Battle of the Ancre) and the battery positions were bombarded for five hours with shells of all calibres, but remained in action all the time. German accounts refer to the 'strong reaction' they received from the British artillery, and the attacks made little headway, ending the offensive on this front. Thereafter most engagements were at extreme range, which wore out the guns and carriages. The brigade concentrated on CB and night firing. On 25 April a low-flying enemy aircraft was brought down by rifle and Lewis gun fire from 127th and 14th Heavy Btys. For most of May and June the battery was kept hidden and silent. In July, however, the workload increased as other brigades were withdrawn to prepare for that summer's offensive, leaving the four batteries of 92nd Bde as the only 60-pdrs on IV Corps' front, carrying out CB and HF tasks as Third Army harassed the enemy with raids.

=== Hundred Days Offensive ===
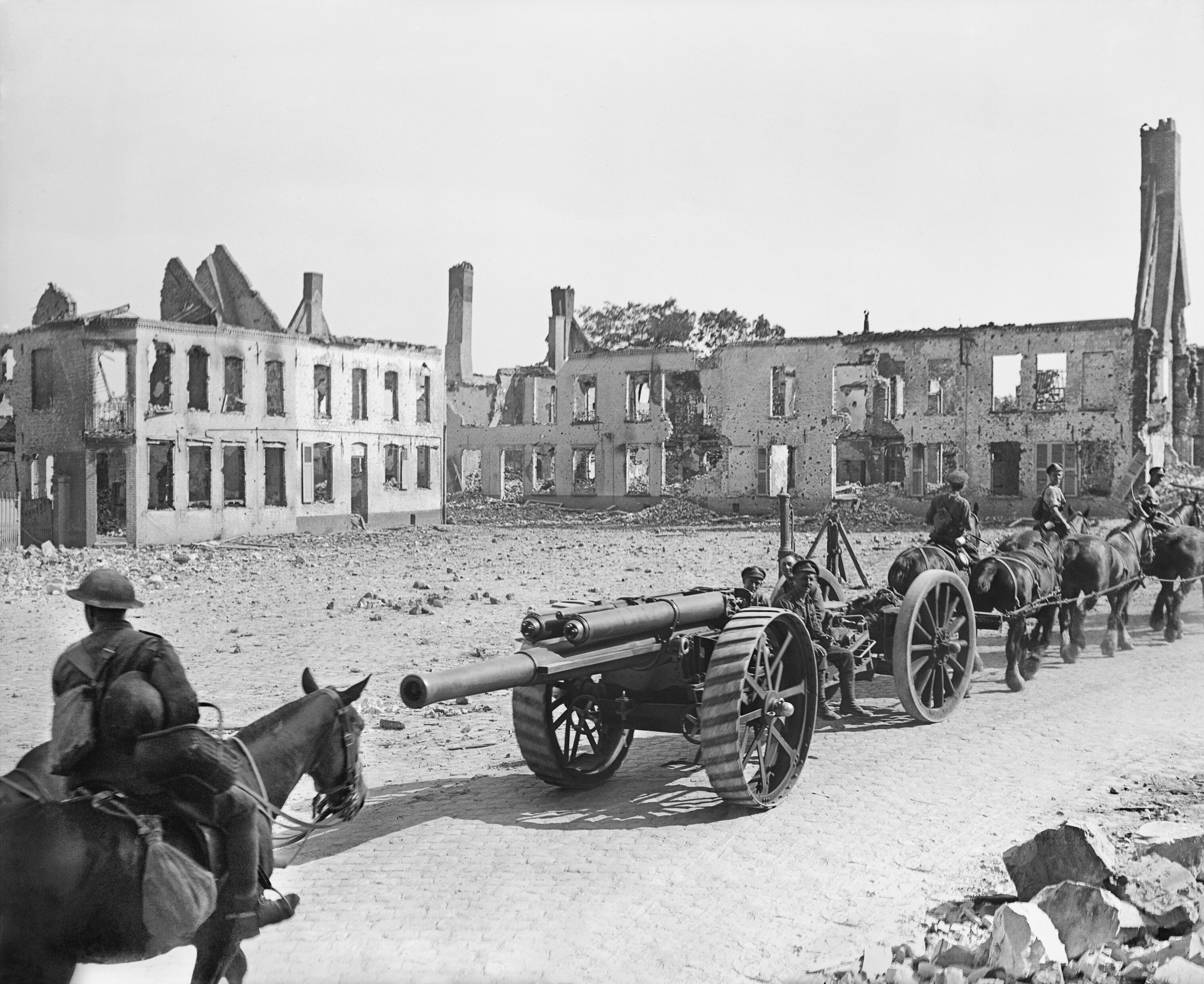
A 60-pounder moving up during the Hundred Days Offensive, 1918.

After the German offensives were halted, the Allies went over to the attack in their own Hundred Days Offensive. Third Army joined in at the Battle of Albert, beginning on 21 August. From Zero hour (04.55) 92nd Brigade's batteries carried out CB fire for 3 hours, then pulled their guns out and advanced through forward-moving traffic to fresh positions behind Bucquoy. By the end of August the batteries were just south of Favreuil, as the mobile warfare continued with the Battle of the Scarpe) The impetus was renewed with the Second Battle of Bapaume, beginning on 31 August. Enemy shelling and bombing was not heavy, and the batteries suffered only light casualties. On 3 September the Germans retreated and the batteries were on the move again, through Frémicourt and Vélu Wood, Ruyaulcourt, and Neuville-Bourjonval (14 September). The advance now paused because the Germans were back in their Hindenburg Line positions. There was severe artillery fire on both sides. On 18 September Third Army participated in the Battle of Épehy to capture the last outposts in front of the Hindenburg Line, with the 60-pdrs contributing neutralising fire on enemy batteries.

The Allies now carried out a series of attacks all along the Western Front, with Third Army launching the Battle of the Canal du Nord on 27 September. Over the following days 92nd Bde moved its batteries up to Gonnelieu, where it received a good deal of retaliatory fire, and then to Gouzeaucourt. On 5 October Maj Marnham took over as acting commander of 92nd Bde. By now the batteries were positioned in the old Hindenburg Line. Zero hour for Third Army's next attack, the Second Battle of Cambrai, was at 04.30 on 8 October, when 92nd Bde provided CB fire for IV Corps' attack. Soon the batteries were struggling over the St Quentin Canal as they moved up to new positions as Third Army broke through the Beaurevoir Line and pursued the Germans towards the River Selle.

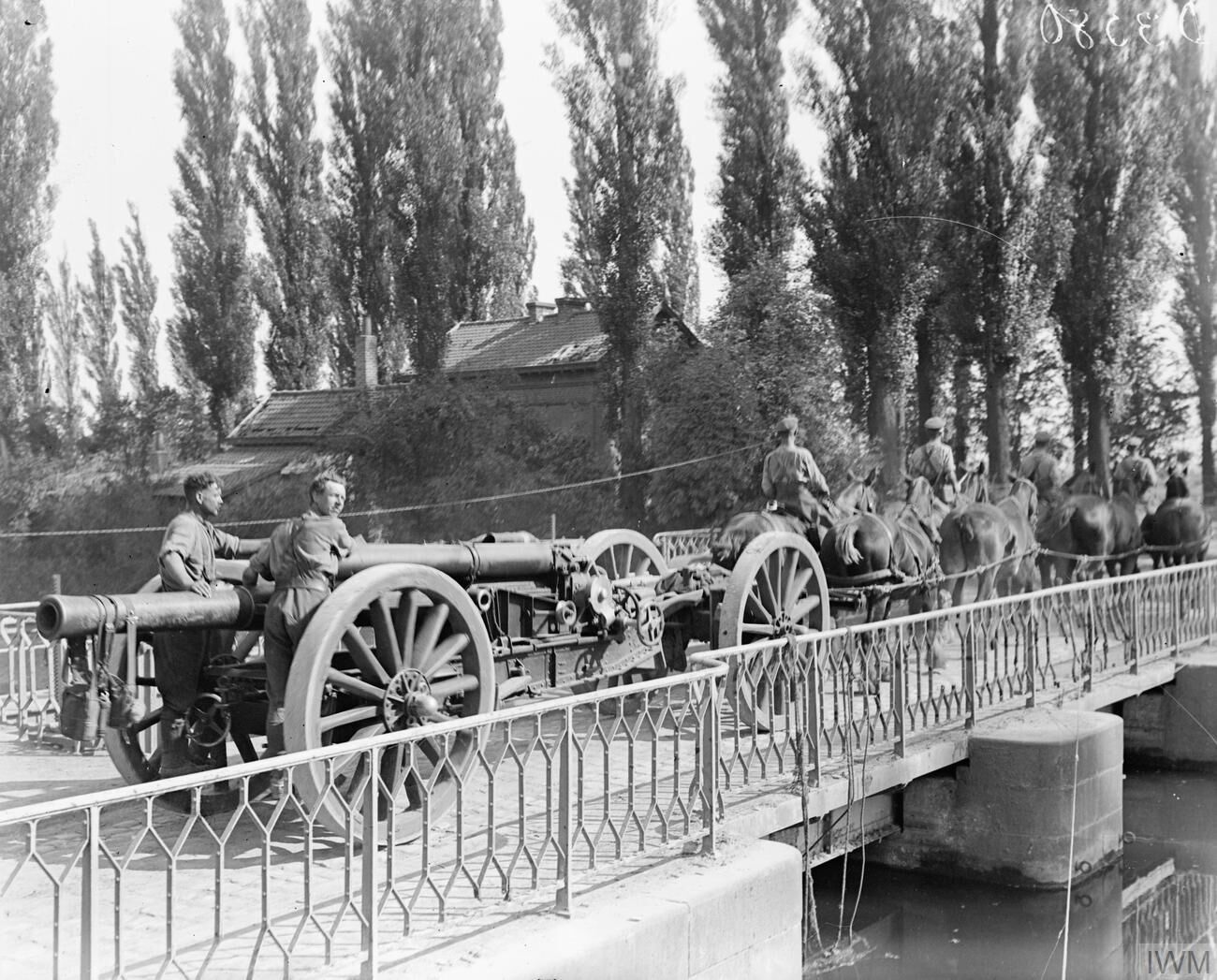
A 60-pounder gun crossing a bridge in September 1918.

There was another pause as the BEF prepared to cross the Selle. 92nd Brigade's batteries continued CB and harassing fire. For the Battle of the Selle there was no long preliminary bombardment, instead a surprise attack was made at 02.00 on 20 October under a full moon, the infantry crossing the river and capturing Solesmes. After firing their CB tasks the batteries quickly moved up, and they crossed the Selle on 22 October. During the October and November fighting heavy guns were not used on the towns, to avoid casualties among French civilians, but the 60-pounders were used to 'search' roads and forest clearings. The BEF's last set-piece action was the Battle of the Sambre on 4 November, in which 92nd Bde supported IV Corps with a complex fire programme. 127th Heavy Bty was now detached under the orders of 37th Division and accompanied it into the dense and muddy Forest of Mormal on 5 November, giving the infantry close support. By 8 November the Germans were out of range and there were no bridges over the Sambre capable of taking a 60-pdr. Hostilities ended on 11 November when the Armistice with Germany came into force.

== Postwar ==
On 14 November 92nd Bde concentrated at Salesches and on 20 November it began a long march into Germany, where it was to form part of the British Army of the Rhine. It reached Merode on 20 December, where early demobilisation of coalminers and other 'pivotal men' began. By 4 January 1919 the brigade was billeted in the Niederzier area, with 127th Heavy Bty in Oberzier. On 19 March it moved to Frechen and joined 63rd Bde. By now demobilisation was reducing the batteries to cadres, and 127th (Bristol) Heavy Battery was disbanded later in 1919.

Under '127th Heavy Bty' the Commonwealth War Graves Commission (CWGC) lists 18 men who died (including three in Germany) and a further name under '127th Heavy Bty (Bristol)' (who died in the UK), but other fatal casualties for the battery may have been listed simply under 'RGA'.

In the 1920s the battery's former OC, Maj Arthur Marnham, MC, TD, commanded the 53rd (London) Medium Brigade (postwar successors to the London Heavy Brigade and 1/1st London Heavy Bty), as a lieutenant-colonel, and became its honorary colonel in 1931.
