= Home Counties (Kent) Heavy Battery, Royal Garrison Artillery =

Home Counties (Kent) Heavy Battery, RGA
- Royal Artillery cap badge
- Active: 1908–1919
- Country: United Kingdom
- Branch: Territorial Force
- Role: Heavy Artillery
- Part of: Royal Garrison Artillery
- Garrison/HQ: Faversham
- Engagements: Attack on the Gommecourt Salient; Battle of the Somme; Third Battle of Ypres; German Spring Offensive; Battle of Albert; Second Battle of Bapaume; Second Battle of Cambrai; Battle of the Selle

The Home Counties (Kent) Heavy Battery, Royal Garrison Artillery, was a unit of Britain's part-time Territorial Force formed in 1908 from elements of an existing volunteer artillery unit in Kent. It fought on the Western Front during World War I, in the Attack on the Gommecourt Salient, at the Battles of the Somme and Passchendaele. During the German Spring Offensive of March 1918, the battery was caught up in the 'Great Retreat', saving its guns but losing the rest of its equipment. It then participated in the Allies victorious Hundred Days Offensive, including the battles of Albert, Bapaume, Cambrai and the Selle. It was merged into a medium artillery (later anti-aircraft) unit in the postwar Territorial Army.

== Origin ==
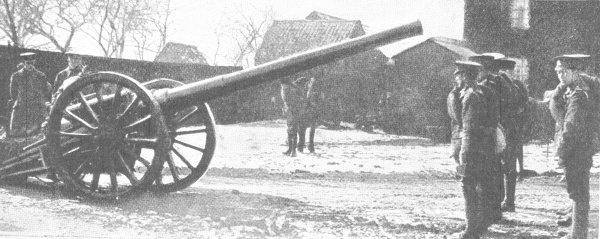
Training on a 4.7-inch gun, ca 1914.

When the Territorial Force (TF) was created in 1908 by the Haldane Reforms, each of the new force's infantry divisions was allocated a heavy battery of the Royal Garrison Artillery (RGA). The Home Counties Division was provided with a battery formed from part of the 1st Kent Royal Garrison Artillery (Volunteers), the rest of which continued as coast defence artillery in the TF.

The new Home Counties (Kent) Heavy Battery was based at Faversham, where the original 2nd Kent Artillery Volunteer Corps had been formed in 1859. The Battery Headquarters and Left Half Battery were at the Drill Hall in Preston Street, Faversham, the Right Half Battery and Ammunition Column at Chatham, and it had a practice battery at Harty Ferry. The battery was equipped with four 4.7-inch guns (sometimes referred to as '45-pounders').

== World War I ==
=== Mobilisation ===
On the outbreak of war on 4 August 1914, the battery mobilised at Faversham under Major E.L. Gowland, who had commanded it since 4 March 1911. After mobilisation, units of the TF were invited to volunteer for Overseas Service, and on 15 August the War Office issued instructions to separate those men who had signed up for Home Service only, and form these into reserve units. On 31 August, the formation of a reserve or 2nd Line unit was authorised for each 1st Line unit where 60 per cent or more of the men had volunteered for Overseas Service. These reserve units absorbed the mass of volunteers who were coming forward. The titles of these 2nd Line units would be the same as the original, but distinguished by a '2/' prefix. In this way, duplicate batteries, brigades and divisions were created, mirroring those TF formations being sent overseas. Thus were formed the 1/1st and 2/1st Home Counties (Kent) Heavy Bys.

The Home Counties Division accepted the liability for service in India to release the regular units of the garrison there for active service on the Western Front. However, heavy artillery was not required for India, so when the division departed on 30 October, the 1/1st Bty stayed behind with the 2nd Home Counties Division that was being formed.

=== 1/1st Home Counties (Kent) Heavy Battery ===
The battery (normally referred to as the 1/1st Kent Heavy Bty) formally joined 2nd Home Counties Division on 30 October 1914, and the division assembled in billets round Windsor, Berkshire during November. It was numbered 67th (2nd Home Counties) Division in August 1915. On 17 November, the 1/1st Bty left the division to equip for overseas service, and it landed at Le Havre on 29 December 1915. It joined the XVI Heavy Brigade, RGA, in Third Army on 31 December and went into billets at La Herlière, south-west of Arras.

In XVI Bde 1/1st Kent Heavy Bty was serving alongside 9th, 14th and 114th Heavy Btys of the New Army, and later 1/1st Lowland and 1/2nd Lancashire Heavy Btys of the TF. On 1 January 1/1st Kent Heavy Bty moved two guns into positions previously occupied by 9th Heavy Bty and took over that battery's billets at Pommier, while the wagon lines remained at La Herlière. The gunners began preparing platforms for the other two guns, despite a shortage of timber. A shortage of ammunition for the obsolescent 4.7-inch guns meant that there was little firing at this time. 1/1st Kent Bty fired a few rounds to register its guns, then from 9 January was given targets such as enemy batteries and observation posts (OPs), using Lyddite and high explosive (HE) and timed Shrapnel shells as available. Otherwise the work consisted of night firing to harass enemy communications. From February to April the battery concentrated on Counter-battery (CB) fire against targets round Essarts and Bucquoy, occasionally firing to break up an enemy working party. In March XVI Bde came under 6th Heavy Artillery Reserve, soon redesignated VI Corps Heavy Artillery.

RGA brigades were redesignated Heavy Artillery Groups (HAGs) in April 1916, and the policy now was to move batteries between them as required. 16th HAG handed over its batteries to the newly arrived 48th HAG on 27 April 1916. The work did not change, but there was more ammunition available and the improved weather meant that aircraft could be used to range the guns onto enemy batteries

==== Gommecourt ====
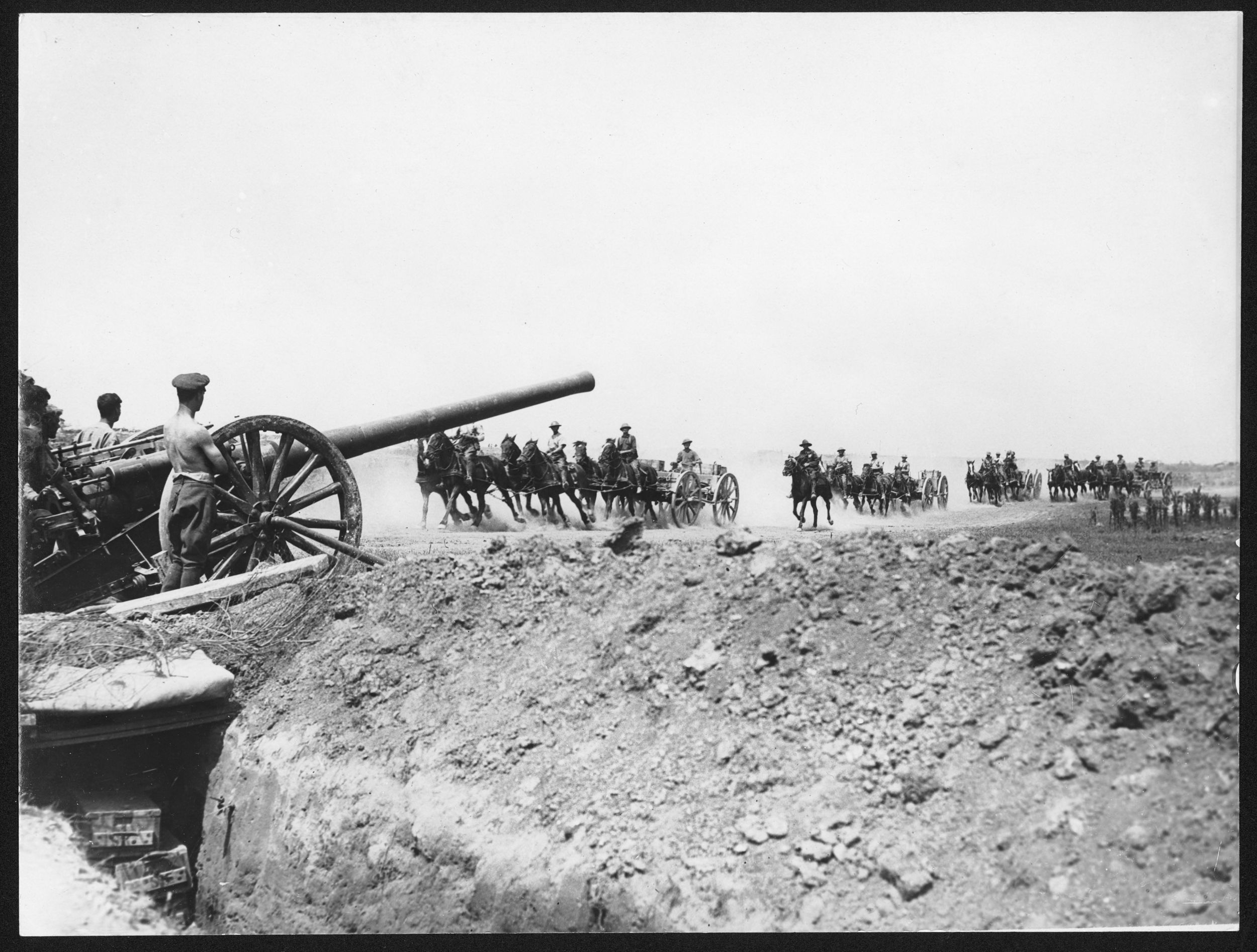
Transport limbers gallop past a battery of British 4.7 inch guns on the Somme.

48th HAG was assigned to VII Corps to support 56th (1/1st London) Division in Third Army's Attack on the Gommecourt Salient for the forthcoming 'Big Push' (the Battle of the Somme). Its main role was CB fire, although its 4.7-inch guns could not actually reach the German heavy gun positions in the rear. The planned seven-day bombardment of the German positions began on 24 June but shortage of 4.7-inch ammunition meant that 48th HAG did not participate in this programme on the first three days (U, V and W Days), only carrying out some 'night line' harassing fire into German-held villages.

The 4.7-inch guns joined in the bombardment programme at dawn on 27 June (X Day), firing into the village of Bucquoy at 06.00. However, accuracy was poor: when the Kent battery fired 30 shells at German Battery position 504 at 11.04, only three were on target. Later the guns practised a six-minute hurricane bombardment on the German positions. Y Day was spent shelling German gun positions, but the weather was poor for observation. Because of the weather, the attack was postposed for two days, and the additional days (Y1 and Y2) were used for further bombardment. On Y2, 48th HAG engaged 18 separate targets, and 1/1st Kent Bty fired 228 rounds, but this was far below the 400 per battery permitted, because of difficulties of observation. Many of these rounds were wide of their intended targets.

On Z Day (1 July), the entire artillery supporting 56th Division fired a 65-minute bombardment of the German front, starting at 06.25. At 07.30 the guns lifted onto their pre-arranged targets in the German support and reserve lines as the infantry got out of their forward trenches and advanced towards Gommecourt. At first this went well for 56th Division. Despite casualties from the German counter-bombardment on their jumping-off trenches, the smoke and morning mist helped the infantry, and they reached the German front line with little loss and moved on towards the second and reserve lines. The artillery Observation Posts (OPs) reported the signboards erected by the leading waves to mark their progress. However, the OPs themselves came under attack from the German counter-bombardment, which prevented supplies and reinforcements crossing No man's land to reaching the leading waves who had entered the German trenches. The heavy guns tried to suppress the German artillery, but the commander of 56th Division commented that although 'our counter-batter groups engaged a large number of German batteries – the results were not apparent'. By mid-afternoon, the division's slight gains were being eroded by German counter-attacks, and all the remaining gains had to be abandoned after dark.

==== Somme ====
The Gommecourt attack had only been a diversion from Fourth Army's main Somme offensive, and Third Army closed it down at the end of the first day. 48th HAG resumed routine work. On 3 August 1/1 Kent Bty was posted to Fourth Army. It pulled its guns out and marched to Talmas to join 18th HAG, arriving on 6 August. It came into action that night about 1,000 yards (910 m) south east of Mametz Church.

18th HAG was supporting the operations of III and XV Corps with CB fire, and firing on 'night lines' against the villages of Morval, Lesbœufs and Flers, together with the nearby road junctions. The Mametz area was subject to German shellfire. The worn-out old 4.7-inch guns were proving troublesome. III and XV Corps attacked in Delville Wood on 18 August, and 18th HAG participated in a protective barrage against a German counter-attack; this sequence was repeated on 31 August. By now, 18th HAG was keeping about 50 enemy batteries under regular bursts of shelling in an attempt to suppress them. XV Corps attacked Ginchy and Guillemont on 3 September but 1/1st Kent's 4.7's were out of action. A shortage of ammunition kept all of 18th HAG's 4.7s silent during the Battle of Flers–Courcelette on 15 September, but by 20 September the group had accumulated 5000 rounds. The batteries resumed night firing and on 24–6 September laid down concentrated bombardments to support the Capture of Gueudecourt. During the Battle of Le Transloy (1 October) 1/1st Kent Bty kept the exits from Ligny village under fire to assist XV Corps. Activity died away on Fourth Army's front during October.

==== Winter 1916–17 ====
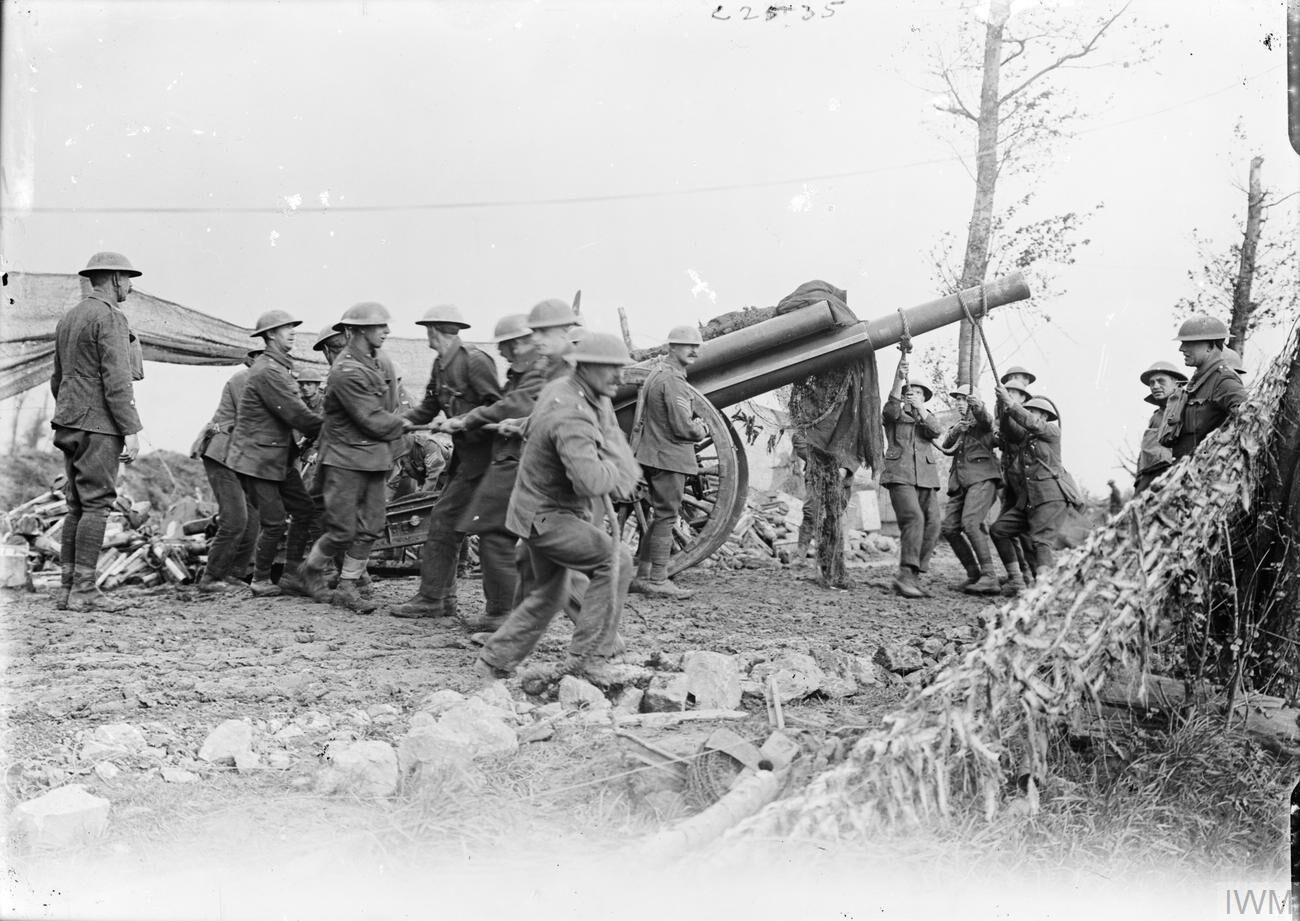
RGA manhandling a 60-pounder gun, 1917.

62nd HAG took over 18th HAG's batteries on 2 December as 18th HAG moved to Bussy-lès-Daours with XV Corps, which was taking over part of front from the French, but 1/1st Kent Bty returned to the command of 18th HAG next day and joined it on 13 December. It had one gun in the workshops but got the other three in position by 15 December. The group began routine shelling of German positions.

On 13 February 1917, 1/1st Kent Heavy Bty battery was joined by a section of 118th Heavy Bty RGA to make it up to a strength of six guns. The 118th Heavy Bty was a regular unit formed at Woolwich shortly after the outbreak of war and had been in France with 4.7-inch guns since 6 November 1914. By now, the heavy batteries on the Western Front were adopting the modern 60-pounder in place of the obsolete 4.7-inch.

The battery transferred to 21st HAG on 17 March. This group was engaged in following up the German retirement to the Hindenburg Line (Operation Alberich). The newly arrived 92nd HAG took over part of 21st HAG at Fins, including 1/1st Kent Heavy Bty, on 30 April.

The group began CB work, then supported 8th Division of XV Corps in a raid against La Vacquerie village (an outpost of the Hindenburg Line) on 5 May. 92nd HAG was now ordered to Poperinge behind the Ypres Salient, and the 1st Echelon of 1/1st Kent Heavy Bty entrained on 1 July.

==== Ypres ====
On arrival at Ypres the battery was posted to 58th HAG with XIX Corps, Fifth Army, as part of the artillery concentration for the forthcoming Third Ypres Offensive. 58th HAG was to act as the Southern CB Group. Its 60-pdr batteries began digging in near Kruisstraaat and began their work. The preliminary bombardment for the offensive began on 16 July and the 60-pdrs carried out 'vigorous' CB neutralising fire day and night, also sweeping the enemy's roads and tracks during the night. The delayed attack (the Battle of Pilckem Ridge) was launched at 03.45 on 31 July. Immediately 58th HAG began vigorous neutralisation of hostile batteries. The 55th (West Lancashire) Division of XIX Corps succeeded in crossing the obstacle of the Steenbeek stream and pressed on past Hill 35 towards the third and fourth objectives. 58th HAG's wagon lines were moved up by noon in preparation for a forward move. But 55th (WL) Division found that the siege guns had hardly touched the concrete pillboxes on the higher slope. The Germans counter-attacked at 17.00, the British infantry had to relinquish Hill 35 and several strongpoints they had captured. At the end of the day 55th (WL) Division held a line just across the Steenbeke. Nevertheless, 1/1st Kent Heavy Bty moved forward at noon on 1 August and was in action next day, the 60-pdr batteries continuing their neutralising CB fire and night bombardment of enemy roads and communications.

Heavy rain then set in and the battlefield turned to mud, severely hampering movement, while the poor visibility restricted observation, so the guns had to fire 'off the map'. The next phase of the offensive was therefore delayed. Meanwhile, the German artillery continued to harass the packed British gun lines, whose own CB fire was spread over a wide area. On 11 August 58th HAG assisted an attack by the neighbouring II Corps on the Gheluveldt Plateau, and on 14 August it bombarded Poelcapelle on 14 August. XIX Corps' own attack at the Battle of Langemarck on 16 August was halted by pillboxes and strongpoints that the heavy artillery had missed, and was then driven back by a strong German counter-attack that was not spotted by the observers in the smoke. 58th HAG then fired in support of XVIII Corps on 19 August. In between, the 60-pdrs fired gas shells into enemy battery positions during the hours of darkness, especially before the attack of 22 August. They provided neutralising fire for a night attack on the Gallipoli strongpoint on 25 August. Then on 27 August the 60-pdrs participated in a Creeping barrage for XIX Corps fighting near Zonnebeke.

1/1st Kent Heavy Bty transferred to 42nd HAG on 5 September when XIX Corps handed over its section of the line to V Corps. The batteries were still 'strafing' enemy roads and communications and trying to neutralise hostile batteries. V Corps was involved in the limited attacks on the Menin Road Ridge (20–25 September) and Polygon Wood (beginning on 26 September), which were highly successful because of the weight of artillery brought to bear on German positions. Fifth Army and V Corps then handed over the line to Second Army and II ANZAC Corps, who launched the successful Battle of Broodseinde (4 October). However, the battles of Poelcappelle (9 October) and First Passchendaele (12 October) were progressively less successful as the weather worsened and the mud became almost insurmountable. British batteries were clearly observable from the Passchendaele Ridge and were subjected to CB fire, while their own guns sank into the mud and became difficult to aim and fire.

==== Winter 1917–18 ====
Finally the battery was pulled out on 21 October and transferred back to 16th HAG, which was under orders to join XIII Corps in a quiet sector on First Army's front at Thélus.

1/1st Kent Heavy Bty left 16th HAG and joined First Army HA in the GHQ Reserve from 20 December to 12 January 1918 In late 1917, the heavy artillery policy was changed, and HAGs became permanent brigades. 1/1st Kent Bty rejoined 92nd HAG on 13 January 1918 and remained with it until the end of the war. This was now designated as 92nd (Mobile) Brigade, RGA, composed of four six-gun batteries of 60-pounders. The brigade was still in GHQ Reserve: the guns were left in their positions, but were not manned; instead in February 1918 the gunners of 1/1st Kent relieved 1st Canadian Heavy Bty to allow its gunners to leave the line for rest and training.

==== Spring Offensive ====
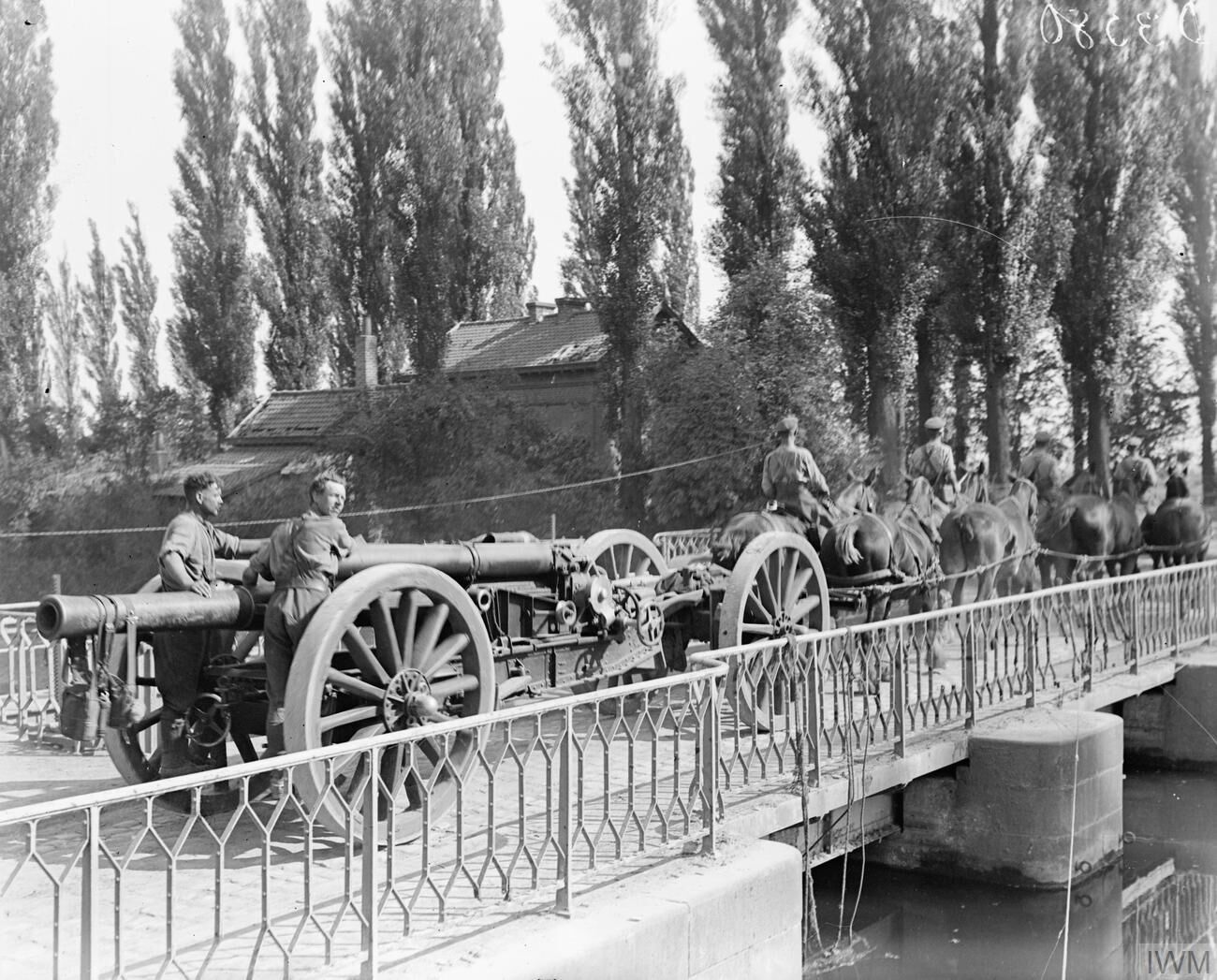
A 60-pounder gun being moved up in 1918.

The Germans launched their Spring Offensive on 21 March 1918. 92nd (M) Bde was sent up from GHQ Reserve that afternoon to reinforce the hard-pressed Third Army, and remained with it until the Armistice with Germany.

1/1st Kent Heavy Bty first moved to Bihucourt, near Bapaume, where it got into position on 23 March and opened fire against the advancing Germans next day in support of 6th Division. However, that evening it was ordered to retire: Bapaume was being evacuated, the 'Great Retreat' had begun and by now the roads were congested. This meant that only the gun teams could struggle through to withdraw the guns, and other equipment had to be abandoned. The battery also suffered a few casualties from a long-range gun. It withdrew through Bucquoy, taking up a number of short-lived positions over the next three days in support of 41st Division. Lieutenant Hutchinson from 127th (Bristol) Heavy Bty took over temporary command of the battery. It came into action between Foncquevillers and Souastre on 27 March with 62nd (2nd West Riding) Division. At first the batteries of 92nd Bde were in the open, to engage any enemy coming over the Hébuterne ridge over open sights, but as the Germans did not get that far the guns were withdrawn behind a crest to hide their flashes. On 5 April the Germans launched a new phase of their offensive (the Battle of the Ancre) and the battery position was bombarded for 6 hours, though only four shells actually fell near. German accounts refer to the 'strong reaction' they received from the British artillery, and the attacks made little headway, ending the offensive on this front. (Note: Individual batteries were no longer required to keep their own war diaries once the RGA brigades became permanent. However, 1/1st Kent Heavy Bty's only surviving war diary begins on 21 March 1918, reflecting the confusion of that period.)

Captain C.H.A. Borradaile from 110th Heavy Bty assumed command of the battery on 7 April and the battery began to replace its missing equipment and stores. Left Section (LX) was moved into gun pits and the off-duty men moved into strong dugouts. The following months were quiet on this front and the batteries continued to re-equip, improve their positions and overhaul their guns. Any firing was at maximum range, and some gun positions were kept hidden and silent.

==== Hundred Days Offensive ====
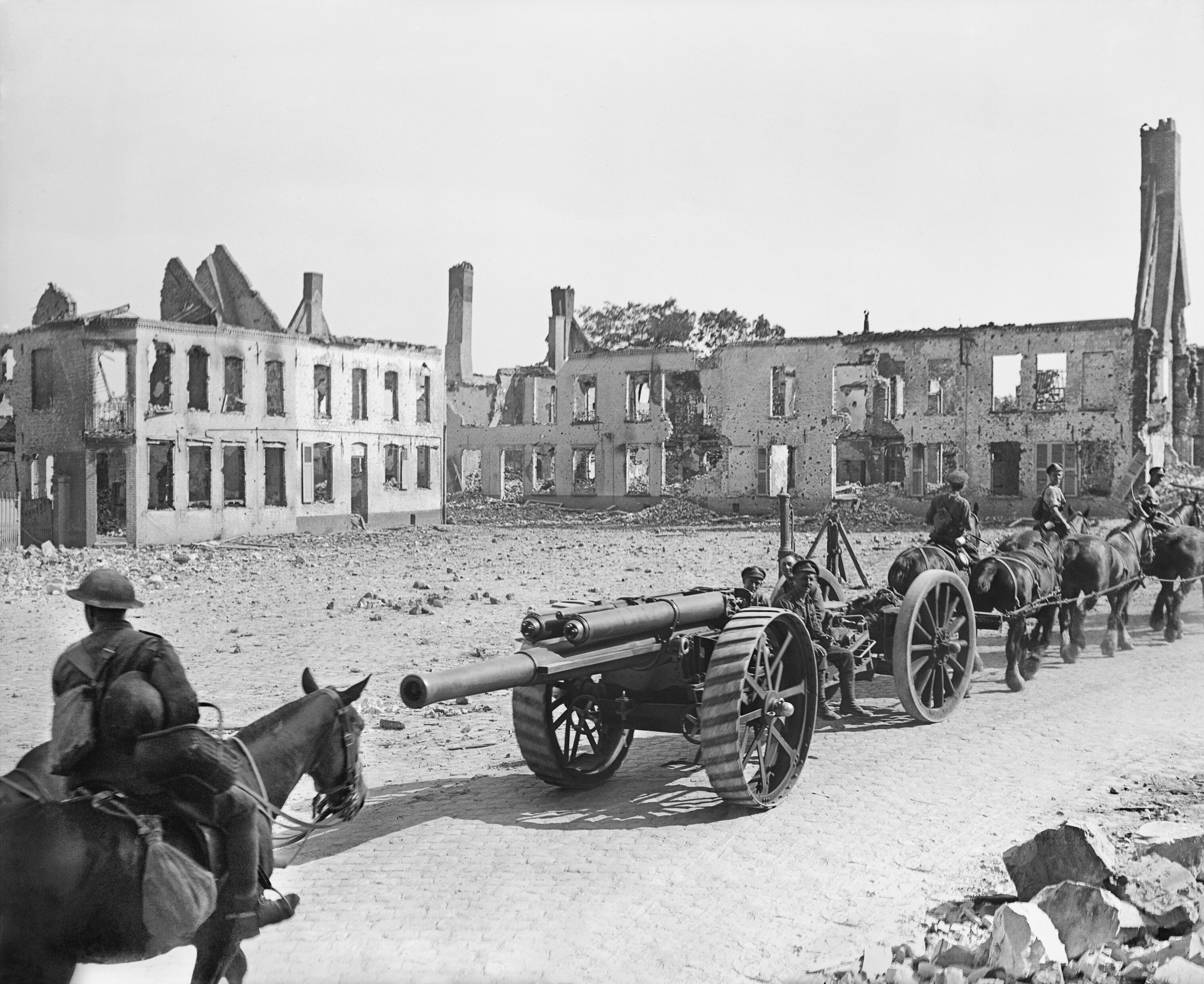
A 60-pounder moving up during the Hundred Days Offensive, 1918.

After the German offensives were halted, the Allies went over to the attack in their own Hundred Days Offensive. Third Army joined in at the Battle of Albert, beginning on 21 August. From Zero hour (04.55) 92nd Brigade's batteries carried out CB fire for 3 hours, then pulled their guns out and advanced through forward-moving traffic to positions behind Bucquoy. Here 1/1st Kent Bty spent the afternoon engaging targets pointed out by observation aircraft. On 22 August the battery moved forward to Essarts, then again on 24 August as far as Achiet-le-Petit, despite traffic jams. The mobile warfare (the Battle of the Scarpe) continued through Bihucourt, and on 28 August 1/1st Kent Bty moved to Biefvillers-lès-Bapaume for a special task of enfilading the Bapaume–Péronne road. By the end of the month 1/1st Kent Bty was east of Favreuil. Unused to mobile warfare, the battery regarded the 10-day advance as an extended training exercise, which it continued during the pause at Favreuil.

The impetus was renewed with the Second Battle of Bapaume, beginning on 31 August. On 3 September the Germans retreated and the batteries were on the move again, through Frémicourt and Vélu Wood, Ruyaulcourt, and Neuville-Bourjonval (14 September). On the way, 1/1st Kent Bty received two new guns to replace those worn out by the heavy firing. The advance now paused because the Germans were now back in their Hindenburg Line positions. The Allies now carried out a series of attacks all along the Western Front, with Third Army's launching the Battle of the Canal du Nord on 27 September. In the evening 1/1st Kent Bty came into action behind Gouzeaucourt Wood, where it had dumped 1000 rounds of ammunition over the previous two days. After the gun teams were clear, the position came under gas and HE fire, which was kept up all night, causing a few casualties and damaging two guns, one of which was repaired. The advance continued, and the battery moved up to La Vacquerie on 30 September, then to Bon Avis and Chenau Wood. Third Army's next attack was the Second Battle of Cambrai on 8 October, when 92nd Bde was assigned to CB fire to support IV Corps' attack. Third Army broke through the Beaurevoir Line, after which it pursued the Germans towards the River Selle. On 9 October 14 and 1/1st Kent Heavy Btys were detached from 92nd Bde and directly attached to the pursuing formations, 37th Division in the case of 1/1st Kents. 37th Division met little opposition and was on its final objective by noon. Over the next three days 1/1st Kent Bty followed through Haucourt, Caudry and Beaumont.

There was another pause as the BEF prepared to cross the Selle. 1/1st Kent Bty reverted to 92nd Bde and continued CB and harassing fire. For the Battle of the Selle there was no long preliminary bombardment, instead a surprise attack was made at 02.00 on 20 October under a full moon. The battery made a short move forward to Viesly, then on 22 October it crossed the Selle to come into action near Briastre. Here it was attached to 37th Division again for the advance to Pont-a-Pierres. During the October fighting heavy guns were not used on the towns, to avoid casualties among French civilians, but the 60-pounders were used to 'search' roads and forest clearings. 1/1st Kent Bty found its biggest problem to be obtaining 60-pdr ammunition, which the divisional artillery could not supply. It was still suffering a few casualties from long range German guns, and took up an alternative position at Salesches on 30 October. For the Battle of the Sambre on 4 November, 92nd Bde supported IV Corps in a complex fire programme to assist 37th Division and the New Zealand Division in capturing the old fortress of Le Quesnoy.

This was 1/1st Kent Heavy Bty's last operation: on 4 November the wagon lines joined the battery at Salesches, where the guns and wagons were parked. Hostilities ended with the Armistice on 11 November. On 20 November 92nd Bde began a long march from Salesches to the Rhine, where it was to form part of the occupation forces. 1/1st Kent Bty reached Merode on 20 December. On 4 January 1919 it moved to Huchem-Stammeln, where it was billeted. Major Borradaile having been sent to hospital, Brevet Lieutenant-Colonel F.W. Loveday assumed command of the battery in February. Numbers began to dwindle as men were demobilised, and 1/1st Kents unofficially adopted the establishment of a 4-gun battery. On 17 March the battery was ordered to be reduced to a cadre, and surplus men and horses were transferred to other batteries. The remaining cadre travelled to Antwerp where on 20 May it embarked on SS Sicilian for Tilbury Docks and was demobilised.

=== 2/1st Home Counties (Kent) Heavy Battery ===
The battery formally separated from 1/1st Bty on 26 December 1914, but it was January 1916 before it received its guns. Even then, vital equipment such as sights were still lacking. 67th (2nd Home Counties) Division had a dual role of training drafts for units serving overseas and at the same time being part of the mobile force responsible for home defence. From November 1915 it formed part of Second Army, Central Force, quartered in Kent with 2/1st Bty at Ightham.

In September 1916, the battery moved to Mundesley in Norfolk, where it joined 4th Provisional Brigade. Provisional brigades were TF home defence formations composed of men who had not signed up for overseas service, but after the Military Service Act 1916 swept away the Home/Foreign service distinction all TF soldiers became liable for overseas service, if medically fit. The Provisional Brigades' role thus expanded to include physical conditioning to render men fit for drafting overseas. The 4th Provisional Brigade became the 224th Mixed Brigade in December 1916 ('mixed' in this context indicating a formation of infantry and artillery with supporting units).

At the time of the Armistice, 2/1st Kent Heavy Battery was still at Mundesley as part of 224th Mixed Bde.

== 205 (Chatham and Faversham) Battery ==
When the TF was reconstituted on 7 February 1920, the Home Counties (Kent) Heavy Battery was reconstituted as 205 (Chatham and Faversham) Medium Battery at Sittingbourne, later at the Drill Hall, Chatham. It formed part of 13th (Kent) Medium Brigade (formerly 4th Home Counties Brigade, Royal Field Artillery). This unit was soon redesignated 52nd (Kent) Medium Brigade, and in 1935 became 58th (Kent) Anti-Aircraft Brigade. The following year, 205 (Kent) AA Battery (now based at Sittingbourne) was transferred to 55th (Kent) AA Brigade.

Early in 1939, as part of the doubling of the strength of the TA after the Munich Crisis, 205 (Kent) Battery left 55th (Kent) AA Regiment (as RA brigades were now termed) to join a new 89th (Cinque Ports) AA Regiment, which was forming as a duplicate of 75th (Cinque Ports) AA Regiment. 89th AA Regiment, including 205 (Kent) Bty, served with Anti-Aircraft Command at the start of the war, but sailed for Egypt in December 1939. It then served with the Eighth Army in North Africa and Italy until it was placed in suspended animation in September 1944.

When the TA was reconstituted on 1 January 1947, the regiment was reformed at Ramsgate as 489 (Cinque Ports) HAA Rgt. Anti-Aircraft Command was disbanded on 1 March 1955 and the regiment was disbanded at the same time.
