= 14th Heavy Battery, Royal Garrison Artillery =

14th Heavy Battery, RGA
- Royal Artillery cap badge
- Active: September 1914–3 March 1920
- Country: United Kingdom
- Branch: Kitchener's Army
- Role: Heavy artillery
- Size: Battery
- Part of: Royal Garrison Artillery
- Garrison/HQ: Woolwich Common
- Engagements: Battle of the Somme; Battle of Arras; Capture of Oppy Wood; Defence of Nieuport; German Spring Offensive; Battle of Albert; Second Battle of Bapaume; Battle of Épehy; Battle of the Canal du Nord; Second Battle of Cambrai; Battle of the Selle; Battle of the Sambre; Capture of Le Quesnoy

The 14th Heavy Battery, Royal Garrison Artillery, was one of the first British Army units recruited for 'Kitchener's Army' in World War I. It served on the Western Front from 1915 to 1918, supporting different formations of the British Expeditionary Force (BEF). It participated in the battles of the Somme and Arras, served on the Flanders coast and against the German Spring Offensive, and took part in the Allies' victorious Hundred Days Offensive. It continued in the Regular British Army postwar.

== Mobilisation & training ==
Alfred Leete's recruitment poster for Kitchener's Army.

On 6 August 1914, less than 48 hours after Britain's declaration of war, Parliament sanctioned an increase of 500,000 men for the Regular Army, and on 11 August the newly appointed secretary of state for war, Earl Kitchener of Khartoum issued his famous call to arms: 'Your King and Country Need You', urging the first 100,000 volunteers to come forward. This group of six divisions with supporting arms became known as Kitchener's First New Army, or 'K1'.

The establishment for each of these divisions included a heavy battery of the Royal Garrison Artillery (RGA) and integral ammunition column, which would take the same number as the division. The senior division of K1 was to be the 8th (Light) Division, numbered after the seven Regular divisions of the British Expeditionary Force (BEF). The new division began to assemble at Aldershot in early September. However, it soon emerged that enough Regular units were returning from overseas garrisons to form an eighth division for the BEF. Under Army Order 382 of 11 September the 8th Kitchener division was renumbered and became 14th (Light) Division, now the junior K1 division; the accompanying heavy battery was similarly renumbered from 8th to 14th Heavy Battery, RGA. (Note: Pre-war Regular RGA batteries took their number from the permanent RGA Company that manned their guns – in 1914 No 14 Company RGA (formed in 1771) was stationed at Shoeburyness Garrison and remained in coast defence throughout the war. – but the new heavy batteries took their number from the infantry division they were raised to support. The battery's war diary refers to the unit as '14th (New) Heavy Battery'; These numbers were retained after the heavy batteries were separated from their parent divisions.)

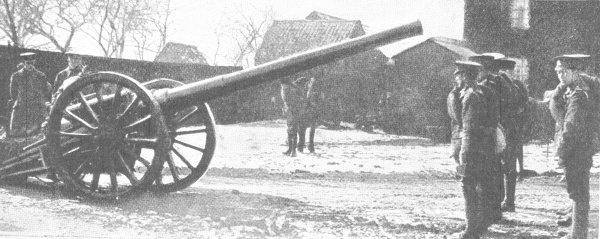
RGA gunners training on a 4.7-inch gun with Mk I 'Woolwich' carriage, ca 1914.

On 3 October 1914, 14th Heavy Bty consisted of one lieutenant and about 12 Regular and re-enlisted Non-Commissioned Officers (NCOs) on Woolwich Common (the other five K1 heavy batteries were in a similar state). Only on 15 October did the first Kitchener recruits arrive, mainly from Newhaven Depot, followed two days later by two obsolescent Boer War-era 4.7-inch guns on converted 40-pounder carriages for training. The men were housed in tents on the common and training was carried out at Shooter's Hill and Blackheath. Some 50 horses were allotted to the battery on 7 November and riding classes began. By 27 November conditions on Woolwich Common were so bad that the battery moved to the Deer Park at Charlton Park, Greenwich. The winter mud was so bad that often the guns could not be pulled out for training. The men moved into huts on 5 January 1915, but only on 30 January were the horses moved into covered stables. Training was also hampered by the rapid turnover of officers and NCOs; the first long-term officer commanding (OC) was Major R.A. Thomas, who joined on 11 February 1915.

The battery left Woolwich on 9 February 1915 and went into billets round Merrow and West Clandon in Surrey, where it joined 14th (L) Division; battery headquarters (BHQ) was at Clandon Park House. At Clandon the battery received its full establishment of horses, but many were in poor condition. On 25 March the battery moved to Aldershot, and between 8 and 15 April attended a practice camp at Larkhill on Salisbury Plain where it fired 50 training rounds, and participated in divisional manoeuvres. At the end of April the battery's other two 4.7-inch guns (on Mk I carriages) arrived and it completed mobilisation.

== Western Front ==
14th (L) Division began moving to the embarkation ports on 18 May. 14th Heavy Bty entrained at Aldershot for Southampton two days later and was split between three transports: SS Archimedes, Minnesota and Empress Queen. After a voyage slowed by fog and anti-submarine precautions, the battery disembarked at Le Havre on 22 May and entrained for St Omer. After a series of marches the battery reached billets behind the Ypres Salient at Westoutre at the end of the month. Officers and specialists went for familiarisation to 109th Hvy Bty.

Artillery policy in the BEF was to withdraw heavy batteries from the divisions and group them into dedicated heavy artillery formations, so 14th Hvy Bty left 14th (Light) Division on 8 June and two days later (together with 1/1st Warwickshire and 9th Hvy Btys) it became part of the recently arrived 16th Heavy Artillery Brigade, RGA.

16th Brigade formed part of an ad hoc group under Colonel Currie ('Currie's Group') in the Armentières sector, and 14th Hvy Bty was ordered to march there. It took up gun positions previously held by 9th Hvy Bty and the gunners went into billets on the outskirts of Bailleul. The battery fired its first round on 11 June and spent the next few days registering its guns, despite enemy shellfire on the observation posts (OPs) and problems with the varied ammunition supplied for the old 4.7s. The BEF was suffering a serious shell shortage, and the daily allowance was small – about 20–30 shrapnel, Lyddite high explosive (HE) or low explosive common pointed shells. Targets comprised bridges, roads and enemy battery positions, including timed shrapnel over an anti-aircraft battery that was firing at a British aircraft. 14th Heavy Bty continued firing a few rounds on most days when weather permitted, chiefly counter-battery (CB) fire, often in retaliation for German shelling of Armentières and Ploegsteert ('Plug Street'). On 26 June the battery scored a direct hit on a factory chimney that was suspected to be a German OP; the chimney fell down that night. During July it also carried out CB fire to neutralise enemy batteries during trench raids by 12th (Eastern) Division. Later it supported 50th (Northumbrian) Division when that came into the sector.

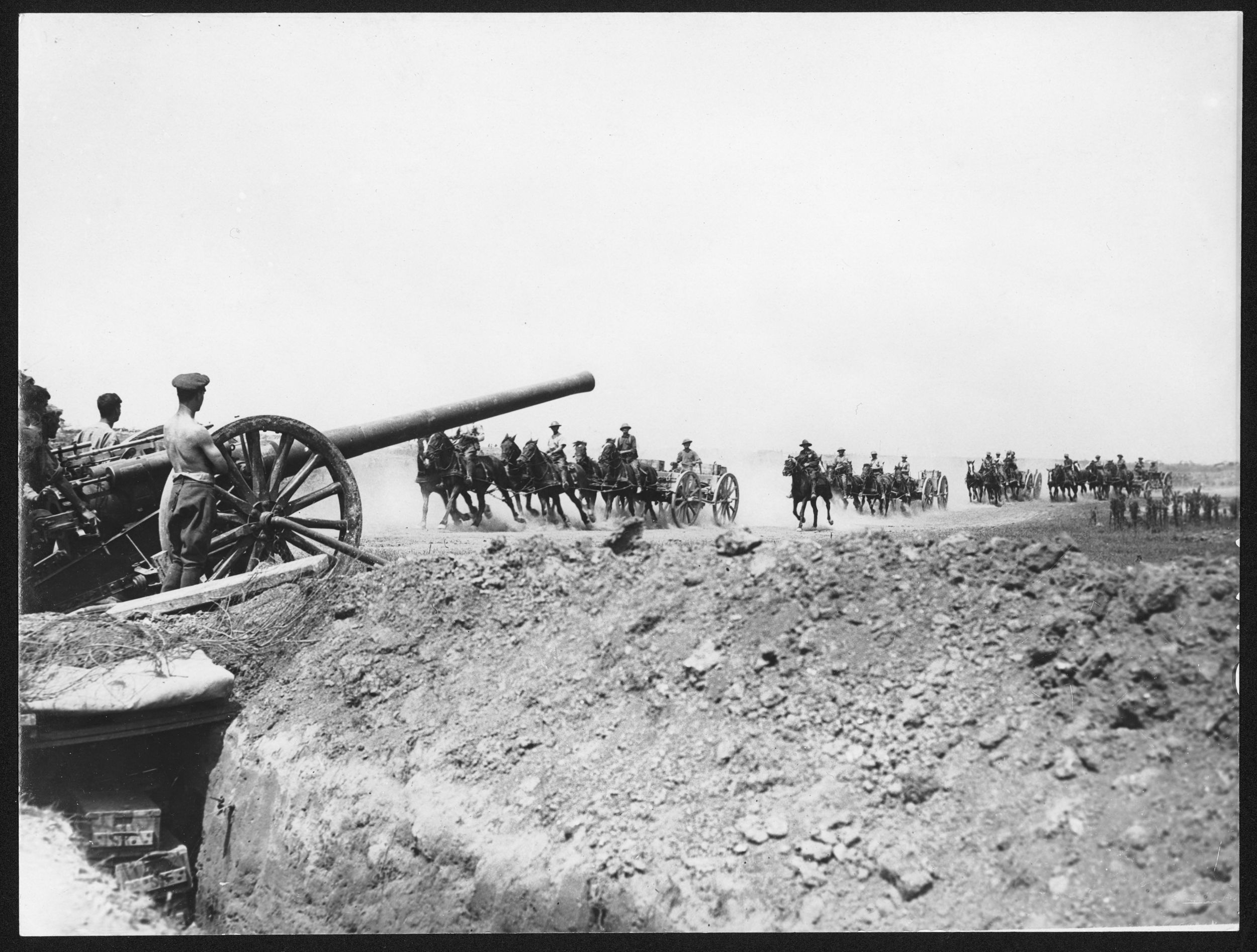
Transport limbers gallop past a battery of 4.7-inch guns.

On 18 July the batteries lost their individual ammunition columns, which were merged into a single brigade column. The other battery wagons went out each day to collect green brushwood with which to camouflage the gun positions, or bricks and timber to make hardstandings for the horses. The British lines were heavily shelled on 9 August while an operation was carried out in the Ypres sector. At this time 16th Bde was supporting II Corps in Second Army. On 4 September the battery's Right Section moved to Bac-Saint-Maur, south of Armentières, where it joined 'Loring's Brigade' and fired at targets around Fromelles in support of First Army. Although it was not directly engaged in the Battle of Loos launched on 25 September, II Corps cooperated with bombardment of the trenches in front of Fromelles and a smokescreen to deceive the enemy: 14th Heavy Bty fired at Frelinghein. II Corps made another demonstration on 13 October but most ammunition was being sent to the Loos sector, so 16th Bde's batteries had a quiet time. Right Section rejoined on 14 October having received commendations for its work.

=== Winter 1915–16 ===
On 1 November 16 Bde transferred to Third Army south-west of Arras marching by way of Doullens. 14th Heavy Bty went into former French gun positions at Bienvillers-au-Bois on 6 November and shared wagon lines with 9th Hvy Bty at Gaudiempré, where the horse lines were in bad condition. After preparing emplacements, 14th Hvy Bty began registration on Hameau Farm on 10 November, with an OP at Berles-au-Bois, but firing was hampered for the rest of the year by bad weather and ammunition shortages. Fatigue parties collected bricks to improve the horse standings, and a fresh OP had to be prepared after the forward observation officer (FOO) was shelled out of Berles-au-Bois. On 4 December the battery exchanged three of its worn out guns for three from 114th Hvy Bty, which was re-equipping with modern 60-pounders. A little more ammunition became available at the end of December, when on several days 14th and 9th fired brigade salvoes on a succession of troublesome enemy batteries. 14th Heavy Bty also fired about 80 rounds of Lyddite on 26 December, enfilading enemy front line trenches opposite the neighbouring French troops, and watching the Germans evacuate the line and run across open ground to shelter, followed by French shrapnel. But the supply of 4.7-inch ammunition was still limited (it was being diverted to guns mounted on Merchant Navy ships), so on 3 January 1916 the battery borrowed two 60-pdrs from 114th Hvy Bty to carry out its tasks until 25 February. Major Thomas had left the battery on 27 December, and he was succeeded on 24 January by Capt P.S. Wiltshire. The early months of 1916 were relatively quiet, the battery carrying out a few CB shoots with observation aircraft.

RGA brigades were redesignated Heavy Artillery Groups (HAGs) in April 1916, and the policy now was to move batteries between them as required. 16th HAG transferred its batteries to the newly arrived 48th HAG on 27 April 1916. At the end of May the battery handed over its obsolete 4.7-inch guns in their emplacements to the newly arrived 133rd (County Palatine) Heavy Bty and took over the latter's new 60-pounder Mk I guns at Authieule on 1 June. It then travelled to Senlis-le-Sec to join 2nd HAG.

=== Somme ===
2nd HAG was with X Corps in Fourth Army preparing for that summer's 'Big Push' (the Battle of the Somme). 14th Heavy Bty prepared gun positions in front of Martinsart and established OPs on the ridge north of Mesnil and on the spur facing Ovillers. The guns were hauled into position and registration began between 15 and 23 June.

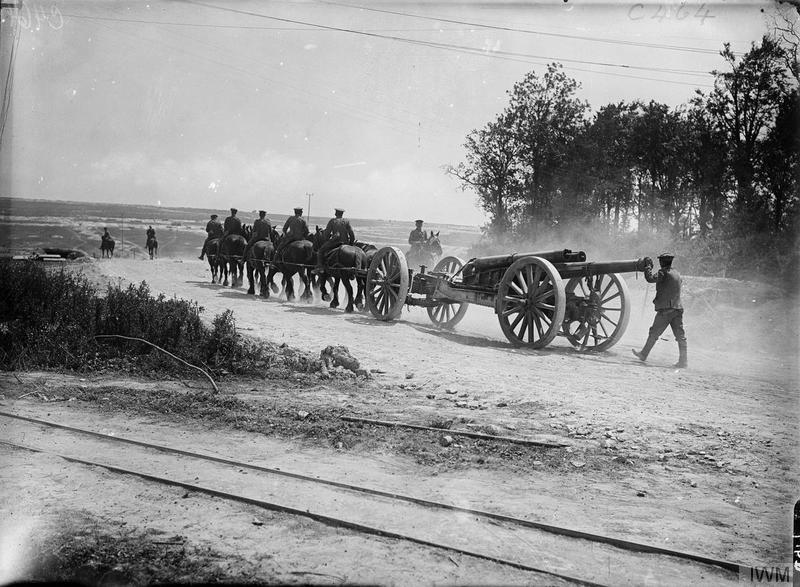
A 60-pounder moving up on the Somme, 1916.

X Corps' task was to advance astride the River Ancre to capture the high ground in front, with 36th (Ulster) Division attacking up the river valley towards the Schwaben Redoubt and 32nd Division assaulting Thiepval and the Leipzig Redoubt before advancing to Mouquet Farm ('Mucky Farm'). The bombardment programme was to extend over five days, U, V, W, X and Y, before the assault was launched on Z day. The strenuous work of firing the heavy guns was divided into 2-hour periods to allow the gunners to rest, Forward Observation Officers (FOOs) to be relieved, and the guns to cool. 14th Heavy Bty's task was to cut the barbed wire near Mucky Farm and Thiepval. The bombardment began on 24 June, but on several days the weather was too bad for good air or ground observation and the programme was extended by two days (Y1 and Y2).

At 06.25 on Z Day (1 July) the final bombardment began. When the infantry launched their assault at 07.30, 36th (Ulster) Division captured most of the German front and support positions without difficulty, and had advanced nearly a mile onto the ridge in the first hour, including the front part of the Schwaben Redoubt. However, St Pierre Divion had been hardly touched by the bombardment and machine guns in the village fired into the flank of the brigade trying to advance up the valley. 32nd Division found the wire well cut and seized the front face of the Leipzig Redoubt, but it too was caught in enfilade while trying to advance further. The corps artillery plan was also too rigid: the heavy guns 'lifted' at set times from one objective to the next, and got away from the infantry, who received no benefit from their fire. By nightfall the 36th Division had been forced out of the Schwaben redoubt, and 32nd Division was left clinging onto the edge of the Thipeval spur and the front face of the Leipzig Redoubt. Over the next two days the gunners helped to collect the thousands of wounded left after the failed assault.

X Corps continued fighting on the Somme through July, now under the command of Reserve Army, including the battles for Bazentin Ridge, Ovillers and Pozières Ridge. 14th Heavy Bty spent part of its time firing to its extreme right in support of III Corps. The battery received a few casualties from night-time shelling, and from an accidental blow-back of one of its guns. Planned moves of OPs forward to Contalmaison and for the battery to Fricourt had to be abandoned.

On 24 July X Corps handed over to II Corps, which continued the fighting for Pozières Ridge, where 14th Heavy Bty had finally got an OP established. The battery supported the continuing heavy fighting between Thiepval, Mouquet and Pozières with wire-cutting shoots. On 14 September it registered trenches near the Leipzig Redoubt from an OP in nearby captured trenches; it bombarded these targets next day during the Battle of Flers–Courcelette. It then continued wire-cutting for the Battle of Thiepval Ridge, and the final capture of Mucky Farm.

Between 30 September and 6 October the battery worked on new gun positions near Pozières. On the latter day the battery was made up to a strength of six guns when it was joined by a section from 172nd Hvy Bty, This battery had been formed at Woolwich on 8 May 1916; it arrived on the Western Front on 30 September and joined Canadian Corps Heavy Artillery on 6 October. It was immediately broken up to reinforce three other batteries, including 14th. The new and re-positioned guns were calibrated and registered, and on 18 October began a wire-cutting bombardment at Stuff Trench, which was captured on 21 October as part of the Battle of the Ancre Heights. For the rest of the month the battery was engaged in night firing. On 2 November three of the battery's guns were condemned and had to be exchanged for new ones: the mud was now so bad that the horses could not move them and they had to be dragged the 300 yards (270 m) to the road by Holt 75 caterpillar tractors. Despite some German gas shelling, the battery continued CB shoots in support of III Corps and bombarded River Trench during the Capture of Beaumont-Hamel on 14 November, which effectively ended the Somme offensive.

=== Arras ===
On 12 December Capt Wiltshire left and was succeeded in command by Capt C. Pearson, who had joined the battery as a lieutenant in October. In late 1916 14th Heavy Bty reconnoitred for new gun positions near Mucky Farm, but was unable to find any access road to get guns there. Some night firing was carried out, despite the bad weather. On 1 January 1917 the battery was transferred to 47th HAG with VI Corps of Third Army at Arras. All six guns were dragged out to the road by tractors on 8 January, and the wagon lines also had difficulty pulling out: motor lorries had to assist the horses dragging the wagons up one hill. By early next morning the battery had reached Warlincourt, but it could not continue until 11 January, when it reached Lattre-Saint-Quentin, about 10 miles (16 km) from Arras. The gunners spent the next month digging gun positions in the Fauboug d'Amiens in the western outskirts of Arras and preparing covered horse standings at the Wanquetin railhead. The battery was officially at rest 13–26 February, then brought four of its guns into position in the Fauboug d'Amiens. It spent March improving its positions and storing ammunition, but shooting was chiefly restricted to registration, responding to SOS calls, and supporting raids.

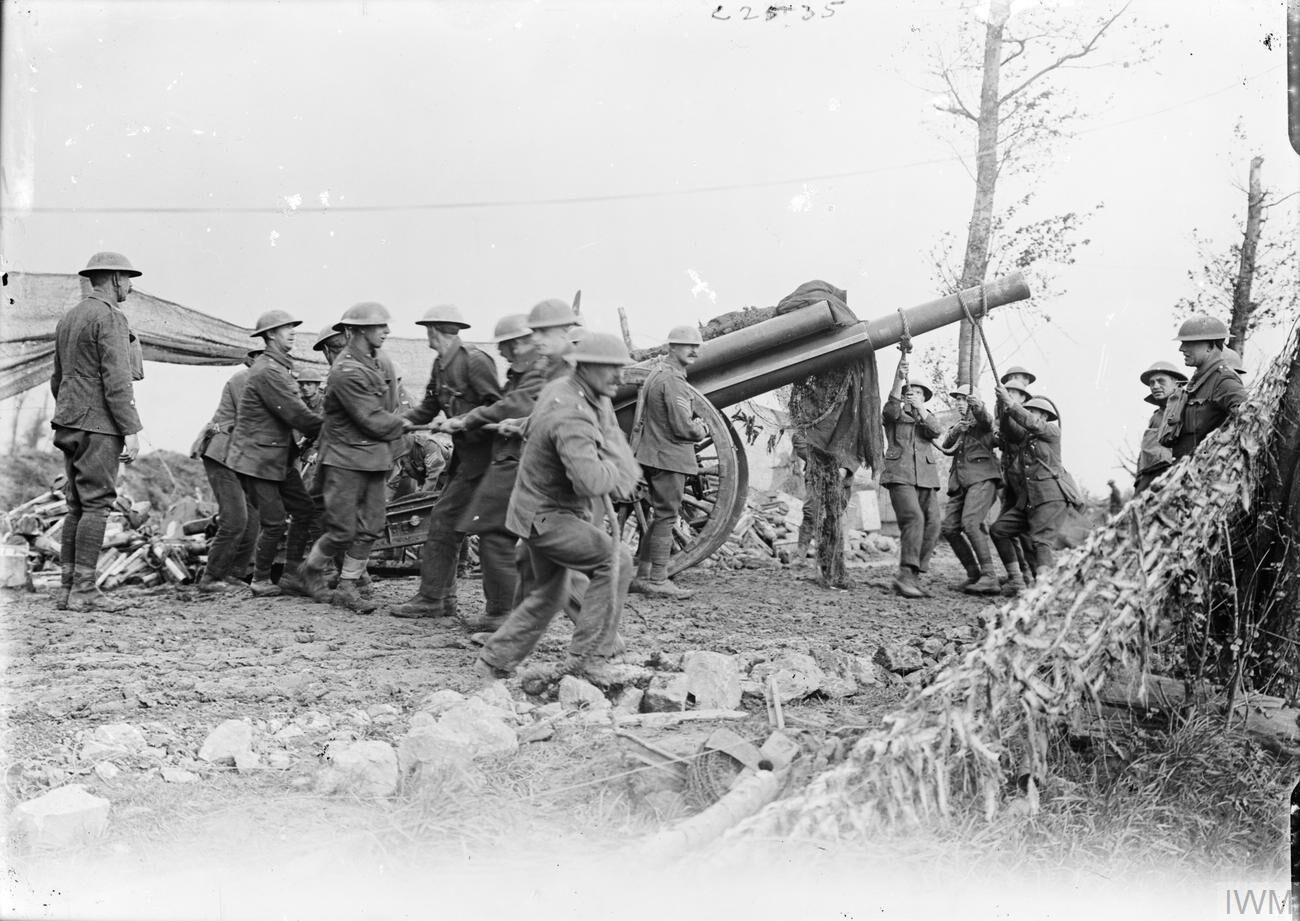
RGA manhandling a 60-pounder gun, 1917.

Third Army was preparing for its Spring Offensive (the Battle of Arras). The main bombardment was planned to last for five days (V, W, X, Y and Z) beginning on 4 April. Given the mass of guns firing, the area bombarded was divided into small zones without overlapping fire, to help the FOOs spot the fall of shot of their own guns. However, visibility was poor on some of the days, so an additional day (Q) was inserted on 7 April and Z day for the attack (the First Battle of the Scarpe) became 9 April. The day before the attack the battery's wagon lines were moved up closer to the gun positions, and 14th Heavy Bty fired gas shells onto hostile batteries during the night. The attack went in at 05.30 and VI Corps had captured Orange Hill and the Wancourt–Feuchy lines by nightfall, an advance of 5,000 yards (4,600 m). 14th Heavy Bty moved up during the day to new positions in Faubourg St Sauveur on the eastern side of Arras, just behind the old front line, while the wagon lines moved into the old battery position. Next day (10 April) the battery operated under 37th Division and was in action all day. On 11 April 37th Division and the cavalry captured Monchy-le-Preux and the battery moved its guns forward to a position on the Cambrai road and the wagon lines moved to Faubourg St Sauveur, while the ammunition column remained at Fauboug d'Amiens.

After that success Third Army's progress slowed. 14th Heavy Bty remained directly under VI Corps Heavy Artillery, supporting first 3rd Division and later 15th (Scottish) Division. The battery fired large amounts of ammunition and suffered a few casualties as the Germans brought up artillery reinforcements. The battery reverted to 47th HAG on 29 April and moved up to a position behind Wancourt Cemetery next day. Large numbers of gas shells were dumped at the gun positions for the next major phase of the offensive, the Third Battle of the Scarpe, which was launched on 3 May. However, the attack was a failure, overwhelmed by stronger German artillery. Major Pearson was wounded and Capt R.A. Watson arrived from 35th Heavy Bty on 6 May to take over command. The battery remained in action at Wancourt, frequently under fire, until 22 May when it moved to a well concealed position near Feuchy Chapelle. It established an OP on Orange Hill, from which it was able to carry out observed shooting on the Drocourt-Quéant Line that the Germans were building. It also supported local attacks round Monchy and Greenland Hill.

The battery was now ordered to join First Army. It pulled out its guns and marched through Arras on 18 June, and on 21 June it established its wagon lines at Anzin-Saint-Aubin and joined 34th HAG with XIII Corps. The battery dug gun-pits at Point du Jour and established an OP near Bailleul behind Oppy. Once the guns were registered the battery had nothing to do except answer SOS calls until 19.10 on 28 June, when it fired as part of an intense surprise barrage supporting 31st Division's successful Capture of Oppy Wood. However, the attack was a diversion and the battery's true destination was further north. On 6 July 34 HAG was ordered to join XV Corps with Fourth Army at Nieuport on the coast.

=== Nieuport ===
The BEF's next planned operation was the Flanders Offensive, aiming to break through at Ypres, with a follow-up attack by Fourth Army along the coast supported by amphibious landings (Operation Hush). The battery moved by sections, and arrived on the evening of 10 July while an intense German bombardment was under way. This was part of a spoiling attack that captured the British front line trenches and pushed the infantry back over the canal. 14th Heavy Bty took up its assigned positions behind a sandbank on a small farm in front of Oostduinkerke. Five guns were emplaced, one being kept in reserve. Firing was exchanged by day and night, and the battery suffered a number of casualties. After Operation Hush was abandoned, the battery came under the command of 1st HAG on 3 September but this did not alter its tasks. On the night of 5/6 September the battery's wagon lines at Coxyde were bombed by enemy aircraft, suffering a number of casualties, and the next day they were moved to Bray-Dunes. The battery was also subjected to severe shelling on 9 October and 11 November; on the latter occasion the gunners managed to put up a smoke screen before the enemy guns completed their ranging, and little damage was suffered.

=== Winter 1917–18 ===
On 4 December the battery handed over its positions to a French unit and pulled its guns out to the wagon lines. Next day it marched to Buysscheure for a period of rest and training. It was ordered to join 92nd HAG at Thérouanne on 26 December, but was unable to move until 11 January 1918 because of bad weather. It joined the group on 15 January and went into billets at Hersin.

In late 1917, the heavy artillery policy was changed, and HAGs became permanent brigades once more. 14th Heavy Bty joined 92nd HAG on 13 January 1918 and remained with it until the end of the war. This was now designated as 92nd (Mobile) Brigade, RGA, composed of four six-gun batteries of 60-pounders. The brigade was in GHQ Reserve: the guns were left in their positions, but were not manned; instead the gunners of 14th Heavy Bty prepared reserve positions on Vimy Ridge.

=== Spring Offensive ===
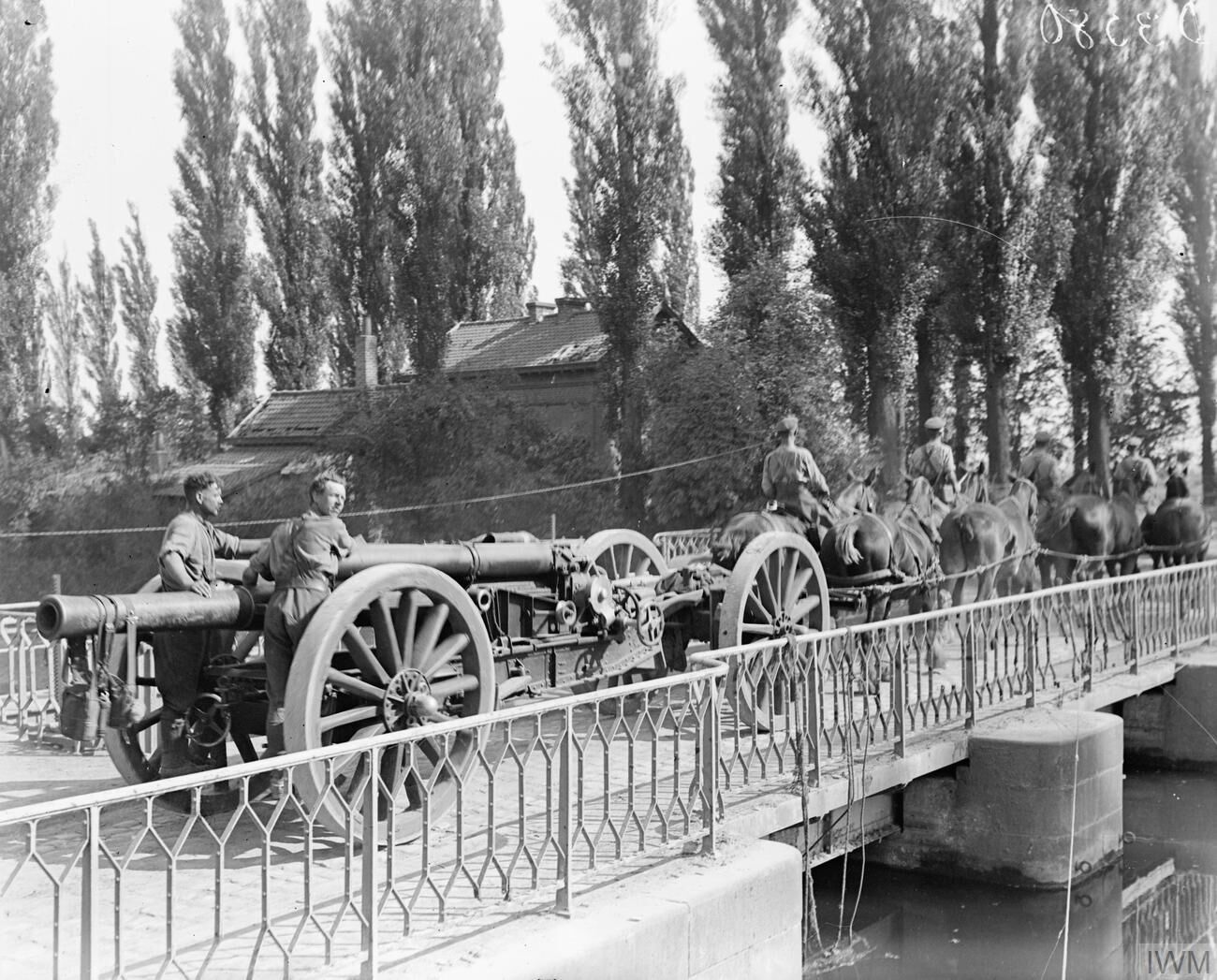
A 60-pounder gun being moved up in 1918.

The Germans launched their Spring Offensive on 21 March 1918. 92nd (M) Bde was sent up from GHQ Reserve that afternoon to reinforce the hard-pressed Third Army, and remained with it until the Armistice with Germany. 14th Heavy Bty moved into positions at Achiet-le-Grand on the evening of 23 March and opened fire against the advancing Germans next day in support of 6th and 41st Divisions. However, that evening it was ordered to retire: Bapaume was being evacuated, the 'Great Retreat' had begun and the roads were very congested. The battery withdrew through Bucquoy, taking up a number of short-lived positions, and came into action between Foncquevillers and Souastre on 26 March with 62nd (2nd West Riding) Division. At first the batteries of 92nd Bde were in the open, to engage over open sights any enemy crossing the Hébuterne ridge, but as the Germans did not get that far the guns were withdrawn behind a crest to hide their flashes. A German aircraft machine-gunned the battery without causing casualties, and was shot down by rifle fire.

On 5 April the Germans launched a new phase of their offensive (the Battle of the Ancre) and the battery position was bombarded for five hours with shells of all calibres, but remained in action all the time. German accounts refer to the 'strong reaction' they received from the British artillery, and the attacks made little headway, ending the offensive on this front. Thereafter most engagements were at extreme range, which wore out the guns and carriages. On 25 April another enemy aircraft was brought down by rifle and Lewis gun fire from 14th and 127th (Bristol) Heavy Btys. On 11 May 14th Heavy Bty moved to 'Willow Patch A', south of Bienvillers-au-Bois where camouflaged gun pits were prepared and the guns moved in after dark. Here the battery was kept hidden and silent. Early on 31 May the battery moved to Hannescamps to take over positions vacated by another battery; that afternoon it was heavily shelled, one gun being put out of action by a direct hit and several men wounded. However, the guns were widely spaced and well camouflaged, and were not much troubled after that, despite the amount of CB firing they carried out during June and July, as Third Army harassed the enemy with raids.

=== Hundred Days Offensive ===
After the German offensives were halted, the Allies went over to the attack in their own Hundred Days Offensive. Third Army joined in at the Battle of Albert, beginning on 21 August. From Zero hour (04.55) 92nd Brigade's batteries carried out CB fire for 3 hours, then pulled their guns out and advanced through forward-moving traffic to fresh positions behind Bucquoy. 14th Heavy Bty engaged 33 separate targets with a total of 1000 rounds during the day. The battery continued firing from this position until dawn on 24 August when it moved up to Achiet-le-Petit, then on 26 August to Bihucourt. It carried on to Biefvillers-lès-Bapaume (29 August) and Favreuil (30 August) as the mobile warfare (the Battle of the Scarpe) continued. The impetus was renewed when the battery supported the attack by IV Corps and VI Corps on 2 September during the Second Battle of Bapaume. Next day the Germans retreated and the batteries were on the move again, through Ruyaulcourt, and Neuville-Bourjonval (10 September). The advance now paused because the Germans were back in their Hindenburg Line positions. There was severe artillery fire on both sides. On 18 September Third Army participated in the Battle of Épehy to capture the last outposts in front of the Hindenburg Line, with 14th Heavy Bty contributing neutralising fire on enemy batteries.

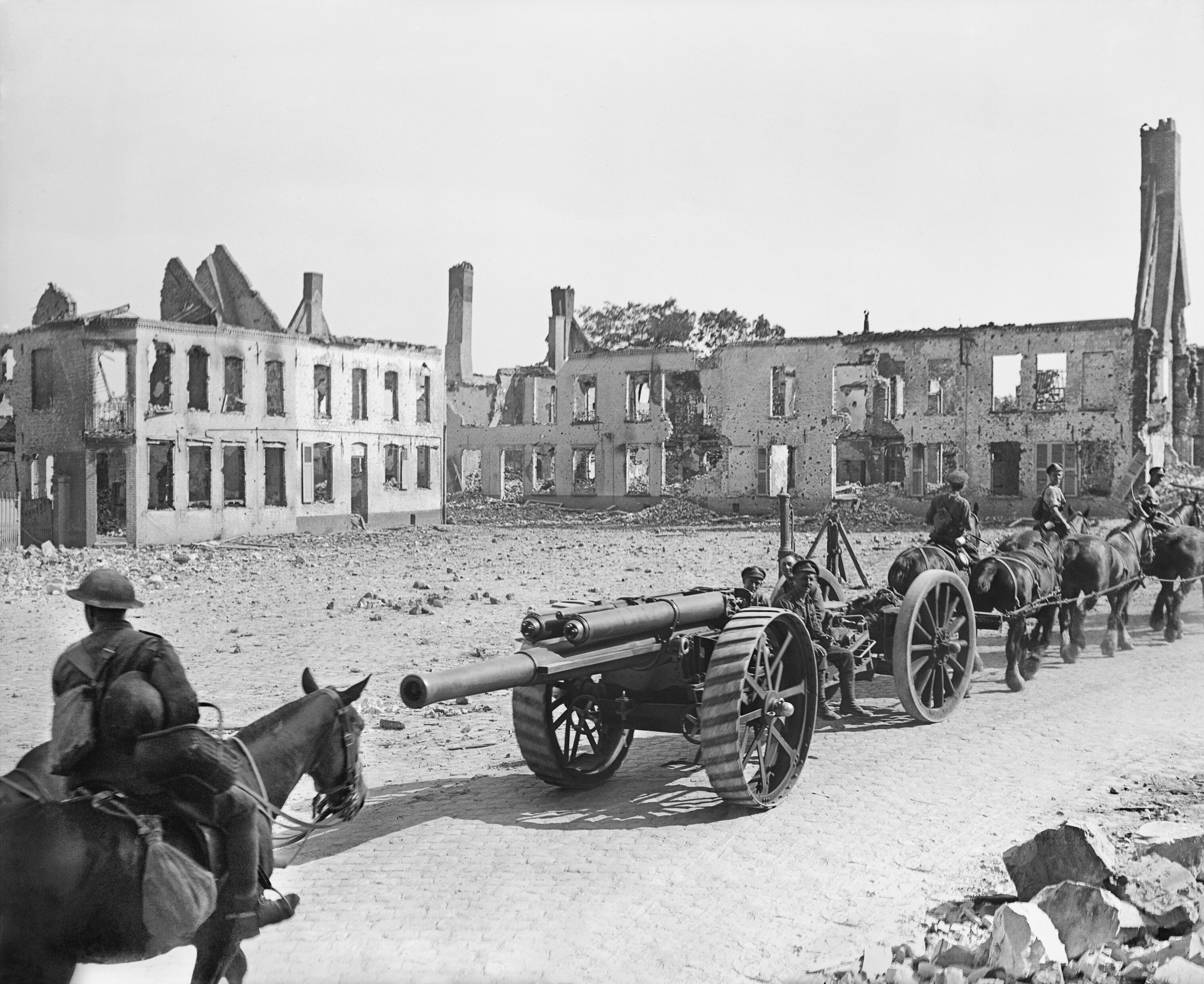
A 60-pounder moving up in September 1918.

The Allies now carried out a series of attacks all along the Western Front, with Third Army launching the Battle of the Canal du Nord on 27 September. The battery received a good deal of enemy retaliatory fire, both in its starting position and while occupying 'Winchester Valley' in the evening. Over the following days 92nd Bde moved its batteries up to Gonnelieu and then Gouzeaucourt. On 6 October 14 Heavy Bty was positioned in the old Hindenburg Line, and next day it moved up to Banteux. At 04.30 on 8 October the battery began firing in support of Third Army's next attack, the Second Battle of Cambrai, when 92nd Bde provided to CB fire for IV Corps' attack. The battery was already moving up to its new position by 07.00, struggling over the St Quentin Canal as Third Army broke through the Beaurevoir Line and pursued the Germans towards the River Selle. On 9 October 14 and 1/1st Kent Heavy Btys were detached from 92nd Bde and directly attached to the pursuing formations, New Zealand Division in the case of 14th. The battery was already out of range by 09.00 and resumed moving forward. The New Zealanders met little opposition and had pushed patrols across the Selle by the end of the day. On 10 October 14th Heavy Bty sent Left Section forward to Fontaine-au-Pire, joined by the rest of the battery next day. However, getting further forward was difficult, because the road ahead was under enemy fire and all bridges and crossroads had been destroyed. The battery came into action at Quiévy.

There was another pause as the BEF prepared to cross the Selle. 14th Heavy Bty reverted to 92nd Bde and continued CB and harassing fire. For the Battle of the Selle there was no long preliminary bombardment, instead a surprise attack was made at 02.00 on 20 October under a full moon, the infantry crossing the river and capturing Solesmes. The battery fired 600 rounds on CB work then moved up to Ferme-au-Tertre. On 22 October it crossed the Selle (losing two horses when a pontoon bridge broke and an ammunition wagon fell in) to come into action near Briastre. Next day it fired another 600 CB rounds as the attack was renewed at 02.30. On 24 October the battery was attached to the New Zealand Division again and advanced to east of Romeries, where it remained for the rest of the month. During the October fighting heavy guns were not used on the towns, to avoid casualties among French civilians, but the 60-pounders were used to 'search' roads and forest clearings, with 14th Heavy Bty harassing the roads round Le Quesnoy. On 1 November No 2 gun suffered a premature detonation, which destroyed the gun and wounded four men; these were the battery's last battle casualties of the war.

For the Battle of the Sambre on 4 November, 92nd Bde supported IV Corps with a complex fire programme. 14th Heavy Bty struggled forward through congested roads under shellfire to get into position in time. It assisted the New Zealanders in capturing the old Fortress of Le Quesnoy and next day advanced with them to Villereau to begin shelling the crossings of the River Sambre. 42nd (East Lancashire) Division now took over and the battery moved with it into the dense and muddy Forest of Mormal on 6 November, giving the infantry close support that was much appreciated. This was the last position occupied by the battery: the Germans were out of range by 10.00 on 8 November and there were no bridges over the Sambre capable of taking a 60-pdr. Hostilities ended on 11 November when the Armistice with Germany came into force.

== Postwar ==
On 14 November 14th Heavy Bty rejoined the rest of 92nd Bde at Salesches and on 20 November the brigade began a long march into Germany, where it was to form part of the British Army of the Rhine. It reached Merode on 20 December and 14th Heavy Bty was billeted in Schlich. On 4 January 1919 it moved to Niederzier. In March demobilisation was proceeding and the battery was ordered to reduce to a cadre.

The battery's Roll of Honour and the Commonwealth War Graves Commission list 20 officers and other ranks of the battery killed or died of wounds during the war, and another 98 wounded.

14th Heavy Bty became simply 14th Bty, RGA, on 7 June 1919, then converted into 14th Mountain Bty, RGA, 3 March 1920 when it absorbed 16th Bty RGA (the former 16th Siege Bty). In this role it continued as a unit of the postwar Regular Army.
