= Battle of Cambrai =

Battle of Cambrai may refer to one of two British World War I campaigns near the town of Cambrai, France:

- Battle of Cambrai (1917), a British military offensive that involved the first successful use of tanks and combined arms
- Battle of Cambrai (1918), a British military offensive during the Hundred Days Offensive of World War I

== See also ==
- War of the League of Cambrai, 1508-1516
