= Battle of Albert (1918) =

Battle during the First World War

Battle of Albert (21–23 August 1918) was the third battle by that name fought during World War I, following the First Battle of Albert and the Second Battle of Albert, with each of the series of three being fought roughly two years apart. This smaller third battle was significant in that it was the opening push that would lead to the Second Battle of the Somme and involved the Australian Corps. The attack opened the advance; the main thrust was launched by the Third Army along with support from the Fourth Army. The Second Battle of Bapaume, from 25 August to 3 September, was a continuation of this battle.

The attacks developed into an advance, which pushed the German 2nd Army back along a 50-mile (80 km) front line. On 22 August, the 18th (Eastern) Division took Albert, with the British and Americans advancing on Arras. The following day, the Australian 1st Division, which was advancing north-east from Proyart, attacked German fortifications around Chuignes, and succeeded in capturing the town.

On 29 August, during the Second Battle of Bapaume, the town of Bapaume fell into New Zealand hands. This resulted in an advance by the Australian Corps, who crossed the Somme River on 31 August and broke the German lines during the Battle of Mont St. Quentin. The Westheer (German armies on the Western Front) was pushed back to the Hindenburg Line, from which they had launched their spring offensive.
