= Battle of Cambrai (1918) =

1918 World War I battle

Battle of Cambrai, 1918
- Part of the Hundred Days Offensive of World War I
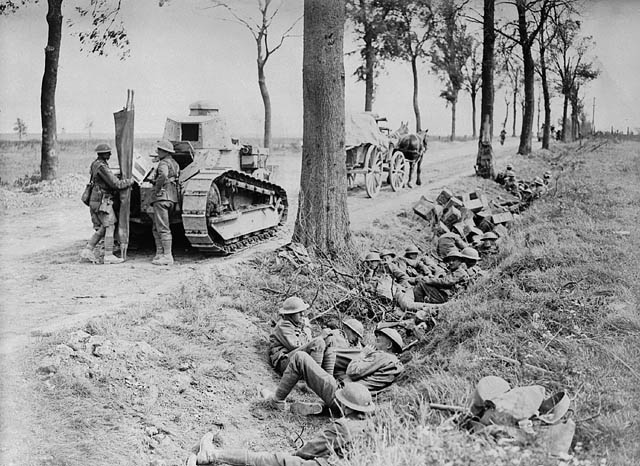
- Canadian troops advancing along the Arras-Cambrai Road
Date	8–10 October 1918
Location	Cambrai, France 50.1767°N 3.2356°E
Result	Allied victory

Belligerents
British Empire: United Kingdom; Canada; New Zealand; India	German Empire

Commanders and leaders
(United Kingdom of Great Britain and Ireland) Henry Horne (United Kingdom of Great Britain and Ireland) Julian Byng (United Kingdom of Great Britain and Ireland) Henry Rawlinson (Canada) Sir Arthur Currie	(German Empire) Otto von Below

Strength
21 British divisions; 3 Canadian divisions; The New Zealand Division; 324 tanks	

Casualties and losses
12,000	~10,000 prisoners

The Battle of Cambrai, 1918 (also known as the Second Battle of Cambrai) was fought between troops of the British First, Third and Fourth Armies and German Empire forces during the Hundred Days Offensive of the First World War. The battle took place in and around the French city of Cambrai, between 8 and 10 October 1918. The battle incorporated many of the newer tactics of 1918, in particular tanks. The battle witnessed over 300 tanks taking part, gaining considerable ground in less than 36 hours, with about 2,000 more British casualties than German, which was light relative to earlier phases of the war.

== Battle ==
The Allies approach to Cambrai was defended by three German lines, spanning some 7,000 yd (6,400 m); held by the 20th Landwehr Division and the 54th Reserve Division and supported by no more than 150 guns. The relatively weak defence was due to the Allied general offensive across the Western Front, and specifically in this sector, the rapid approach of the Canadian Corps, who had overwhelmed much stronger defences in the previous days in the Battle of the Canal du Nord. The German defenders were unprepared for the Allied bombardment and the use of 324 tanks, closely supported by infantry and aircraft.

On 8 October, the 2nd Canadian Division entered Cambrai and encountered sporadic and light resistance. The Canadians rapidly pressed northward, leaving the "mopping up" of the town to the 3rd Canadian Division following close behind. When the 3rd Canadian Division entered the town on 10 October, they found it deserted; fewer than 20 casualties had been suffered.

The Battle of Cambrai in October 1918 was a watershed in the closing stages of World War I. Once the Hindenburg Line was broken and Cambrai was taken, the pace of the Allied advance rarely afforded the retreating German Army time to stop and dig in. The Germans usually took up positions in urban areas, using civilian populations to reduce the likelihood of artillery bombardment, and the ad hoc defences offered by buildings, walls and other reinforced obstacles to engage the advancing Allied infantry. The war shifted from trench warfare to a campaign of movement and manoeuvre.

== Aftermath ==
Although the capture of Cambrai was achieved significantly faster than expected, German resistance northeast of the town stiffened, slowing the advance and forcing the Canadian Corps to dig in.

The British soldier Arthur Bullock recounts entering Cambrai after it had been taken and the Front had moved to a ridge beyond. He describes the continued repulsion of the German forces, with "masses of troops being deployed and withdrawn to a strict timetable", and recorded that "what made the heart beat faster was the sound of music – the battalions were marching in with bands playing". He recalled that over half a million men could be seen from one position: "It was a spectacle on a grand scale, of irresistible military might operated on a clockwork basis with an assurance and buoyancy of spirit which baffles description". Bullock also recalls marching through "The empty echoing streets of Cambrai, with the band playing jazz".
