= 16th Heavy Battery, Royal Garrison Artillery =

Artillery unit of the British Army in World War I

- Royal Artillery cap badge
- Active: 11 September 1914–19 April 1919
- Country: United Kingdom
- Branch: New Army
- Role: Heavy Artillery
- Size: Battery
- Part of: Royal Garrison Artillery
- Engagements: Battle of the Somme; Batle of Arras; Battle of Messines; Third Battle of Ypres; Battle of the Lys; Hundred Days Offensive

The 16th Heavy Battery, Royal Garrison Artillery, was a unit recruited as part of 'Kitchener's Army' in World War I. It served on the Western Front from 1915 to 1918, supporting different formations of the British Expeditionary Force (BEF). It participated in the battles of the Somme, Arras, Messines and Ypres. The battery was forced to destroy its guns to prevent their capture during the German Spring Offensive of 1918. It later took part in the Allies' victorious Hundred Days Offensive. It briefly continued in the postwar Regular British Army.

== Mobilisation and training ==
Alfred Leete's recruitment poster for Kitchener's Army.

On 6 August 1914, less than 48 hours after Britain's declaration of war, Parliament sanctioned an increase of 500,000 men for the Regular British Army, and the newly-appointed Secretary of State for War, Earl Kitchener of Khartoum issued his famous call to arms: 'Your King and Country Need You', urging the first 100,000 volunteers to come forward. This group of six divisions with supporting arms became known as Kitchener's First New Army, or 'K1'. Recruitment was rapid and the 'K2' units followed shortly after, including 16th (Irish) Division authorised on 11 September. The divisional artillery for this formation (16th (I) DA) was quickly raised at Cahir, Fermoy and Kilkenny in September 1914, though few of the original gunners were actually Irish. The establishment for an infantry division at the time was four Royal Field Artillery (RFA) brigades (Note: 'Brigade' was the Royal Artillery term for a lieutenant-colonel's command comprising a number of batteries 'brigaded' together; it was the equivalent of an infantry battalion or cavalry regiment.) equipped with 18-pounder guns and 4.5-inch howitzers, together with a heavy battery of the Royal Garrison Artillery (RGA) to be equipped with four 60-pounder guns. 16th Heavy Battery, RGA (16th HB) was consequently raised as part of 16th (I) DA.

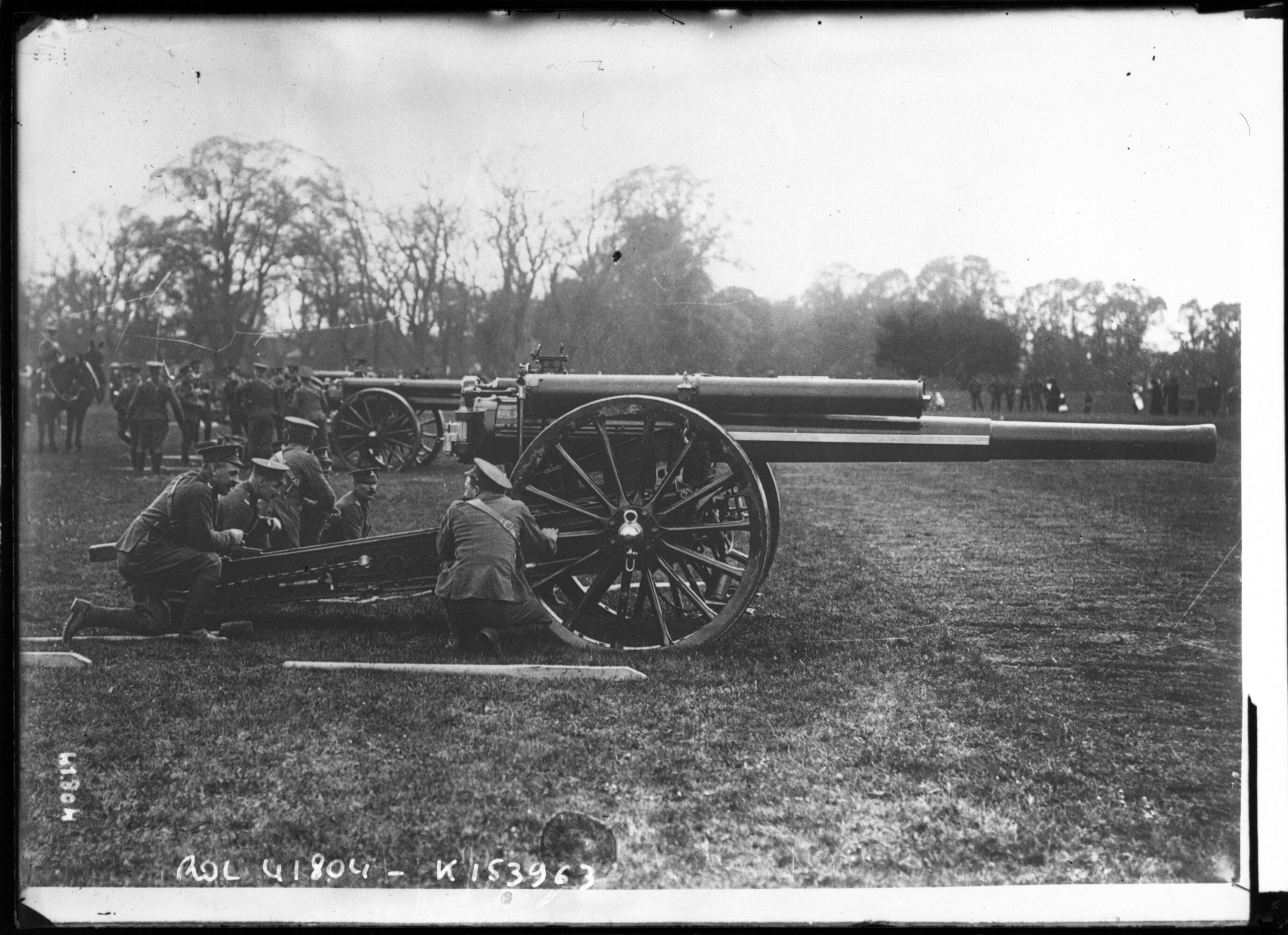
60-pounder guns.

The training of 16th (I) Division progressed slowly, and to begin with the artillery 'had neither guns, dial sights, directors, nor harness for the horses'. It was some months before the batteries were able to obtain even 15 horses each, let alone guns. Eventually 16th HB was fully equipped with guns and its own battery ammunition column (BAC). In a change of policy heavy batteries were removed from divisional artillery in 1915 and 16th HB was transferred to 21st Heavy Brigade, RGA, forming at Charlton Park near Woolwich in England. The brigade mobilised on 9 July and embarked at Southampton Docks two days later. (Most of the rest of 16th (I) DA also left the division soon afterwards and became Guards DA in France.)

== Western Front ==
21st Heavy Bde HQ arrived in France on 12 July, and reached its billets at Muncq-Nieurlet near Saint-Omer on 15 July, where it found 16th HB already billeted under the command of Major C.G. Pritchard. (Note: On the outbreak of war Pritchard had been commanding an RGA company in Hong Kong. By 2 July 1917 he was Brigadier-General, Heavy Artillery, of XIX Corps.) 16th Heavy Bty was designated as HQ Bty of the brigade. After spending some time training, the brigade entrained on 28 July at Audruicq, 16th HB filling the second train while its BAC travelled with Brigade HQ. They detrained at Mondicourt in the Arras sector and marched to Thievres, where they came under the orders of 4th Divisional Artillery (4th DA) in VII Corps of Third Army. The batteries took over positions from the French Army in the Somme sector, with 16th HB at the end of a wood on the east side of the village of Mailly-Maillet. 21st Heavy Bde described this as 'almost an ideal position', screened by a false crest 1,200 yards (1,100 m) in front. German guns had 'searched' behind this crest for a dummy battery placed by the French, but the French battery alongside 16th Hyv Bty had been undisturbed for several months. 16th Heavy Bty established its observation post (OP) in the front line near Mesnil and the waggon lines, gun teams and BACs were placed at Acheux, the BACs later moving further back to Sarton to obtain water for the horses. 16th Heavy Bty suffered its first casualties On 11 August when a stray enemy shell fell in the officers' billets, killing and wounding three officers.

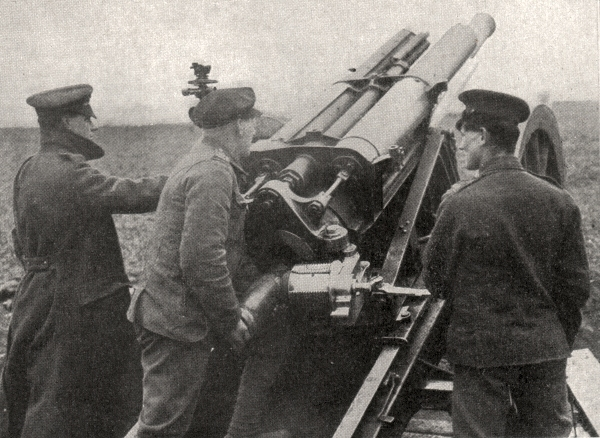
Loading a 60-pounder.

=== Trench warfare ===
16th Heavy Bty opened fire on 29 August, bombarding a German position in conjunction with the 4.5-inch howitzers of 4th DA, 'with considerable effect'. However, 16th HB, like all 60-pdr units at the time, experienced trouble with fractured buffer springs of their guns due to faulty manufacture and poor quality oil. During September the battery settled into the routines of trench warfare, registering its guns on reported enemy battery positions around Beaumont-Hamel. On 10 September it advanced one gun to within 800 yards (730 m) of the front line and dug it in. The objective was to engage an enemy observation balloon at Irles that was outside normal range. The gun's buffers were filled with pure glycerine to allow it to fire at high elevation, a special range table compiled, and an OP established at Auchonvillers cemetery. When the balloon was hauled down, the gun opened fire with high explosive shells, the fourth round causing the balloon to deflate rapidly, apparently the result of shell splinters. The gun then turned on the balloon hanger and damaged it. The range for this special shoot was recorded as 11,400 yards (10,400 m), and the Germans moved their balloons out of rangek, where they were less effective.

From 21 to 24 September 16th HB's guns were moved to Gaudiempré to act as a reserve for 19th Bde, RGA, during the preliminary bombardment for a forthcoming Anglo-French offensive in the north (the Battle of Loos). Afterwards Right Section returned to the Mailly position, but Left Section was positioned in the open near Colincamps. The Loos attack came on 25 September, and 4th DA joined in the diversionary operations by bombarding the lines opposite; Left Section of 16th HB fired on communication trench exits in front of Serre, Right Section on a trench strongpoint and communication trenches in front of Beaucourt. There was little activity on VII Corps' front during October, but the batteries did a considerable amount of registration in conjunction with observation aircraft from No 8 Squadron, Royal Flying Corps. 16th Heavy Bty concentrated both sections at Mailly in early November. The work of the 60-pdrs was mainly counter-battery (CB) fire, but as more ammunition became available battery commanders had freedom to fire on targets of opportunity identified by the OPs, and in general bombardments by 4th DA.

On 12 March 1916 21st Hvy Bde was transferred to the command of the new Fourth Army, which was being formed to take over the Somme front. At this time 16th HB left and joined XVII Corps, which was taking over the Arras sector from the French Army. It remained with XVII Corps Heavy Artillery (HA) until 1 June, when it returned to the Somme where Fourth Army was preparing for that summer's 'Big Push ' (the Battle of the Somme).

=== Somme ===
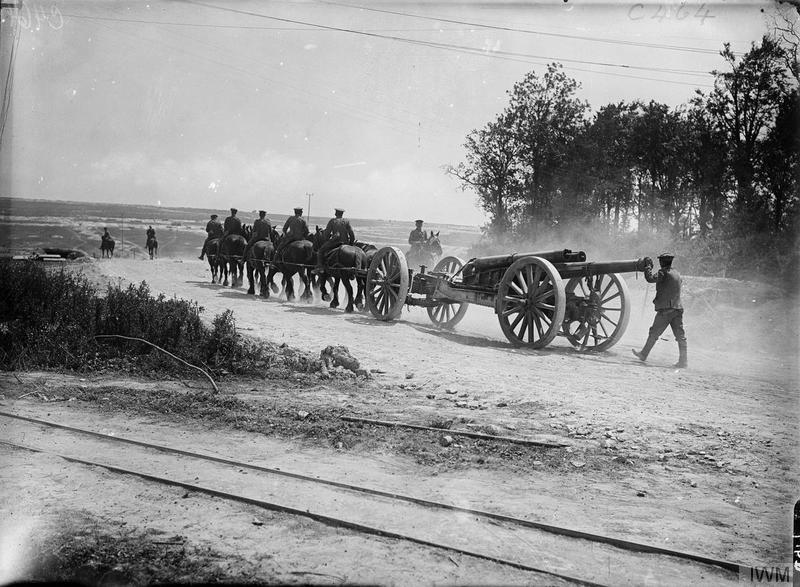
A 60-pounder moving up on the Somme, 1916.

16th Heavy Bty under the command of Capt J.A,M. Cummings joined 4th Heavy Artillery Group (HAG) (Note: RGA brigades had been redesignated Heavy Artillery Groups (HAGs) in April 1916.) at Orville on 10 June 1916. Next day it established its advanced waggon lines at Coigneux, and that night it pulled its four guns into position. Half the men were billeted at Sailly, and half at Chateau Haie. On 17 June it began ranging its guns on 'Pendant Copse' and consolidating its positions. 4th HAG was supporting VIII Corps on the left (north) flank of Fourth Army's attack. The corps' role was to capture the enemy trenches along the Grandcourt Ridge in front, including the fortified villages of Beaumont-Hamel, and Serre, and to form a defensive flank facing north.

The bombardment programme was to extend over five days, U, V, W, X and Y, before the assault was launched on Z day. The main work for the 60-pdr batteries was CB fire, firing for 'destruction' rather than 'neutralisation' and using aircraft observation to pinpoint their targets. The results on VIII Corps' front were reported to be excellent. When not engaged in this the 60-pdrs added their fire to attempts to cut the barbed wire obstacles in front of the opposing trenches. The strenuous work of firing the heavy guns was divided into 2-hour periods to allow the gunners to rest, Forward Observation Officers (FOOs) to be relieved, and the guns to cool. The bombardment began on 24 June, but on several days the weather was too bad for good air or ground observation and the programme was extended by two days (Y1 and Y2), particularly to complete the wire-cutting. Z Day was therefore 1 July.

On Z Day the 60-pdr batteries of VIII Corps commenced their CB fire at 05.00 as usual. The whole bombardment reached high intensity from 06.25 until 07.20 when it ceased on VIII Corps' front while a mine was fired under the German 'Hawthorn Redoubt'. The infantry then 'went over the top' at Zero (07.30). It was difficult to assess whether the intense CB fire had been successful in keeping down enemy artillery. At Zero the Germans ceased their own CB fire and concentrated every surviving gun onto the attacking infantry, together with fresh heavy batteries behind the Beaucourt Ridge that had previously been silent, as well as machine guns brought up from shelter in deep dugouts. During the morning 4th HAG's OPs reported heavy enemy fire from in front of Serre and from the north, and that the troops of 31st Division were held up in the opposing second and third lines, which the Germans were shelling. 4th Division's attempt to get beyond the 'Quadrilateral' strongpoint in the German front line had completely failed. Meanwhile, the Germans were shelling the British front line, preventing reinforcements and supplies getting through to the attackers. A fresh bombardment by the 'heavies' was ordered for 12.00–12.25, and 16th and 112th HBs were turned onto enemy-held trenches that enfiladed the attack, but the attack could not be renewed. About 14.30 16th HB came under enemy gas shelling. By now no British infantry could be seen in the German positions and it was clear that the attack had failed. The heavy batteries resumed their CB fire. Next day was quiet as both sides cleared their wounded and reorganised. 16th HB only had one gun in action (probably after the gas shelling) and fired just 88 rounds. On 3 July it was heavily shelled again.

The attack on VIII Corps' front had been a disaster, and the offensive was closed down in this sector. On 4 July the corps came under Reserve Army's command, and on that day 16th HB under Capt Cummings transferred to 17th HAG (Fourth Army). However, it returned to 4th HAG on 12 July when that group was reorganised as VIII Corps' CB group of five 60-pdr batteries. The group carried out considerable firing on the morning of 14 July to support Fourth Army's attack at the Battle of Bazentin Ridge. Over the following weeks the group concentrated CB fire on enemy batteries firing towards the south, where Fourth Army was continuing the offensive. The batteries sometimes received retaliatory fire from the enemy. XIV Corps took over from VIII Corps on 30 July, then handed over to V Corps on 16 August, but 4th HAG's tasks remained the same. Reserve Army resumed active operations on 3 September with an attack astride the Ancre valley towards St Pierre Divion by 39th and 49th (West Riding) Divisions. 4th HAG's batteries fired concentrations against groups of enemy batteries, and responded to calls from the infantry, but mist made observation difficult. The attack failed, and that night the enemy retaliated with gas shelling on 4th HAG's positions. The batteries resumed routine CB fire next day. Reserve Army launched a new attack (the Battle of Thiepval Ridge) at 12.35 on 26 September, in which 39th Division participated, and 4th HAG's batteries joined in. The 60-pdrs fired concentrations on enemy batteries north of the Ancre and kept the exits from the village of Grandcourt and corresponding entrances of enemy communication trenches under continuous shellfire. Vigorous CB fire and barrages on the road and trenches between Grandcourt and St Pierre Divion were kept up over the next three days as the attack continued, but observation sometimes became impossible due to the mist and smoke.

Persistent mist hampered observation in early October, but routine firing on enemy batteries and working parries continued. 16th Heavy Bty was made up to a strength of 6 guns on 5 October when a section joined from 183rd Heavy Battery. This 6-gun battery had gone out to the Western Front on 30 September 1916, joined V Corps' Heavy Artillery on 5 October, and was broken up the same day, with one section going to each of 16th, 19th and 25th HBs in 4th HAG. The newly-arrived guns had the Traction engine wheels more commonly seen with tractor-drawn guns.

The exchanges of fire with hostile batteries continued, becoming particularly heavy when the neighbouring II Corps captured the Schwaben Redoubt and Regina Trench in mid-October. Reserve Army became Fifth Army on 30 October. The last phase of the Somme Offensive came in mid-November when Fifth Army made a new attempt to capture Beaumont-Hamel. Fifth Army had more artillery available than on 1 July, and the plan was to use this to isolate the area of attack by firing on all roads and approaches. As well as CB tasks 16th HB carried out some wire-cutting for the infantry. On V Corps' front the artillery was also to effect a tactical surprise: every morning about 30 minutes before dawn, the night firing programme was followed by an hour's bombardment of the enemy trenches by the heavy guns, ending with intense fire in which the field batteries joined. It was hoped that the Germans would become accustomed to this routine and would not anticipate the assault on 13 November when the intense barrage came down at 05.45. As the field gun barrage began to creep forward to cover the infantry advance, 4th HAG's batteries switched to 'operation targets' at 05.47. Observation being impossible because of fog, they kept up a heavy continuous fire throughout the day on all registered hostile batteries, firing approximately 2350 rounds. V and II Corps cleared the slopes above the Ancre, the enemy being cut off by the artillery fire and in little condition to resist, though there was fierce fighting in the trenches around Beaumnt-Hamel before the village was cleared and no progress was made beyond. During the night 16th HB maintained a barrage on a vital crossroads and the 'Puisieux Alley' communication trench. The attack was renewed next day with firing on operation targets from 06.00. 16th Heavy Bty also fired occasionally on infantry reported in Puisieux Alley. Beaucourt was captured by 10.30, and the artillery turned to defence against counter-attack. From noon onwards 4th HAG fired concentrations on groups of hostile batteries, and as the weather improved the batteries responded to calls from the OPs and aircraft. Fog again hampered operations on 15 November, 4th HAG's batteries maintaining a slow blind bombardment of registered targets, but fine weather the next day allowed observation aircraft to fly, and numerous calls were received to disperse gatherings of enemy infantry. Snow fell on the night of 17/18 November and V Corps made its final attack at 06.12 in a sleet storm, which 4th HAG supported as best it could with blind fire on the usual operation targets and hostile batteries. Snow and rain then halted the offensive for the rest of the year and the heavy batteries resumed their routine tasks.

=== Arras ===
After the shutdown of the Somme Offensive, 16th HB was transferred to the command of 42nd HAG on 9 December, and remained with it through the winter. Then on 31 March 1917 it was moved north to join 67th HAG with First Army in the Loos sector. 16th HB was assigned to gun positions codenamed 'Ale' and 'Cadet', later moving to 'Agent' at Chateau Mercier in Mazingarbe. The group's tasks involved destructive shoots on roads and villages, with nightly shrapnel fire searching the approaches to Lens. Further south First Army launched an assault on Vimy Ridge on 9 April to open the Arras Offensive, and 67th HAG contributed retaliatory shoots on the Loos 'Double Crassier' and the villages of Annay, Vendin-le-Vieil and La Bassée, neutralisation shoots on hostile batteries, and shelled enemy working parties. As Third Army continued the offensive in front of Arras, 67th HAG was placed at the disposal of the Cavalry Corps, and on 11 April used its 60-pdr batteries to shell Rœux and the exits from Boiry-Notre-Dame as the cavalry entered Monchy-le-Preux. In the afternoon they dispersed an enemy infantry battalion near the Bois de Sart.

After its participation in the offensive ended 67th HAG's batteries continued their routine tasks, including supporting occasional trench raids. Between 24 and 26 April a number of the group's battery positions were targeted by German CB fire, and some battery positions were altered: 16th HB's positions at Chateau Mercier were now designated 'Apple' and 'Ale'. 67th HAG was reorganised on 4 May and at 22.00 16th HB was ordered to fill all its ammunition waggons and pull back that night to the waggon lines at Vaudricourt in preparation for a move to another corps. The battery and its BAC set off from Vaudricourt the following evening and arrived at Marœuil on 6 May, parking its waggons and guns at the edge of the village. Here it joined XIII Corps HA and on 8 May was assigned to 77th HAG at the 'Labyrinth'. It placed five of its guns (the sixth was worn out and was sent to the railhead for replacement) in an old German trench south-east of Thélus. However, having registered the guns, Left and Right Sections were withdrawn to Marœuil to overhaul their guns, leaving one gun and two old carriages with 139th HB and receiving two new guns and 45 heavy draught horses from that battery in exchange. On 17 May Bty HQ under Maj A.L. Cruickshank, Left Section, and a section of the BAC carried out a five-day march to join 29th HAG in II Anzac Corps HA on 21 May, going into action south-east of Neuve Eglise behind Ploegsteert. It established an OP on Hill 63, registered its two guns, and began CB work. It came back under 42nd HAG's command on 24 May.

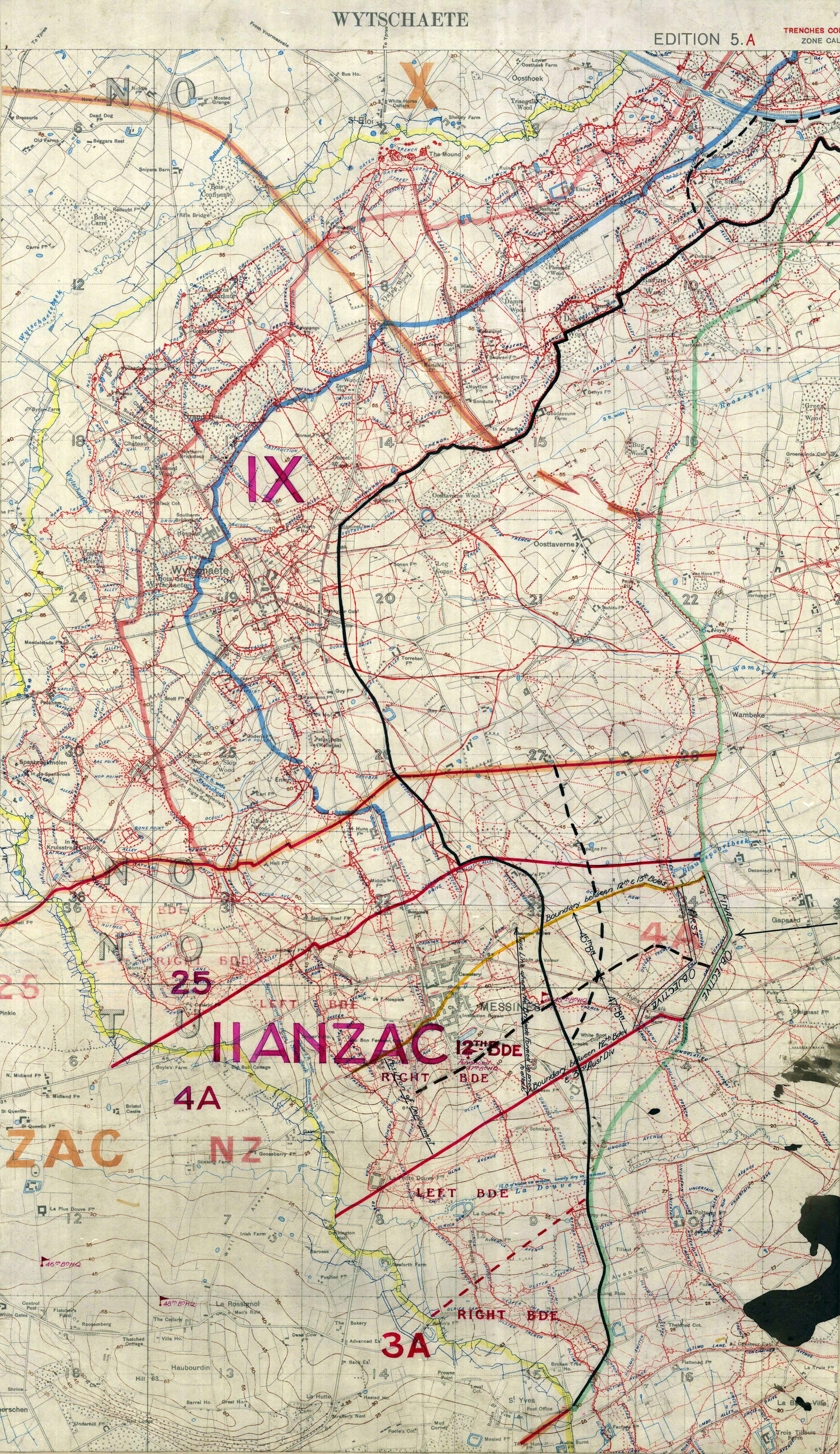
The plan for the Battle of Messines.

=== Messines ===
Right and Centre Sections arrived from XIII Corps with their overhauled guns on the night of 31 May. They were greeted by a heavy bombardment of German 150 mm howitzers the following morning, which left two men wounded and one gun pit knocked out with its gun buried. 16th Heavy Bty's arrival was part of a massive artillery reinforcement of Second Army, which was planning a set-piece attack to capture the Messines–Wytschaete Ridge (the Battle of Messines). The plan was to neutralise every German gun within 9,000 yards (8,200 m) of the assault: II Anzac Corps alone had four HAGs for CB fire. The artillery duel had already begun when 16th HB arrived, and as it carried out its CB work guided by OPs on Hill 63 and Mont Kemmel, it was shelled daily at intervals by heavy howitzers and gas shells, suffering a steady trickle of casualties. The six guns fired over 1000 rounds on most days of the bombardment and were kept in action for the whole time apart from minor repairs. British artillery fire died away about 02.40 on the morning of 7 June. Before dawn, at 03.10, the surprise element of the plan was revealed: the simultaneous explosion of 19 huge mines dug under the ridge, which blew the German front line system to bits before the infantry advanced. II Anzac Corps had as its objective the southern shoulder of the ridge including the fortified village of Messines, and it swept through the German forward position, then fought its way into the village. After driving back a counter-attack, the corps continued in the afternoon to capture the Oosttaverne Line. Over the following days the Australians bombed their way forward to consolidate their position. On 10 June Right Section of 16th HB moved forward to a new position behind Hill 63, and was joined by the rest of the battery next day. They then resumed CB work, using OPs on Hill 63 and north-east of Messines. The battery had some drivers and horses gassed in helping a siege battery to get forward. 16th Heavy Bty took its guns out of action on 24 June and withdrew to the waggon lines for rest, sending two worn guns away to be exchanged.

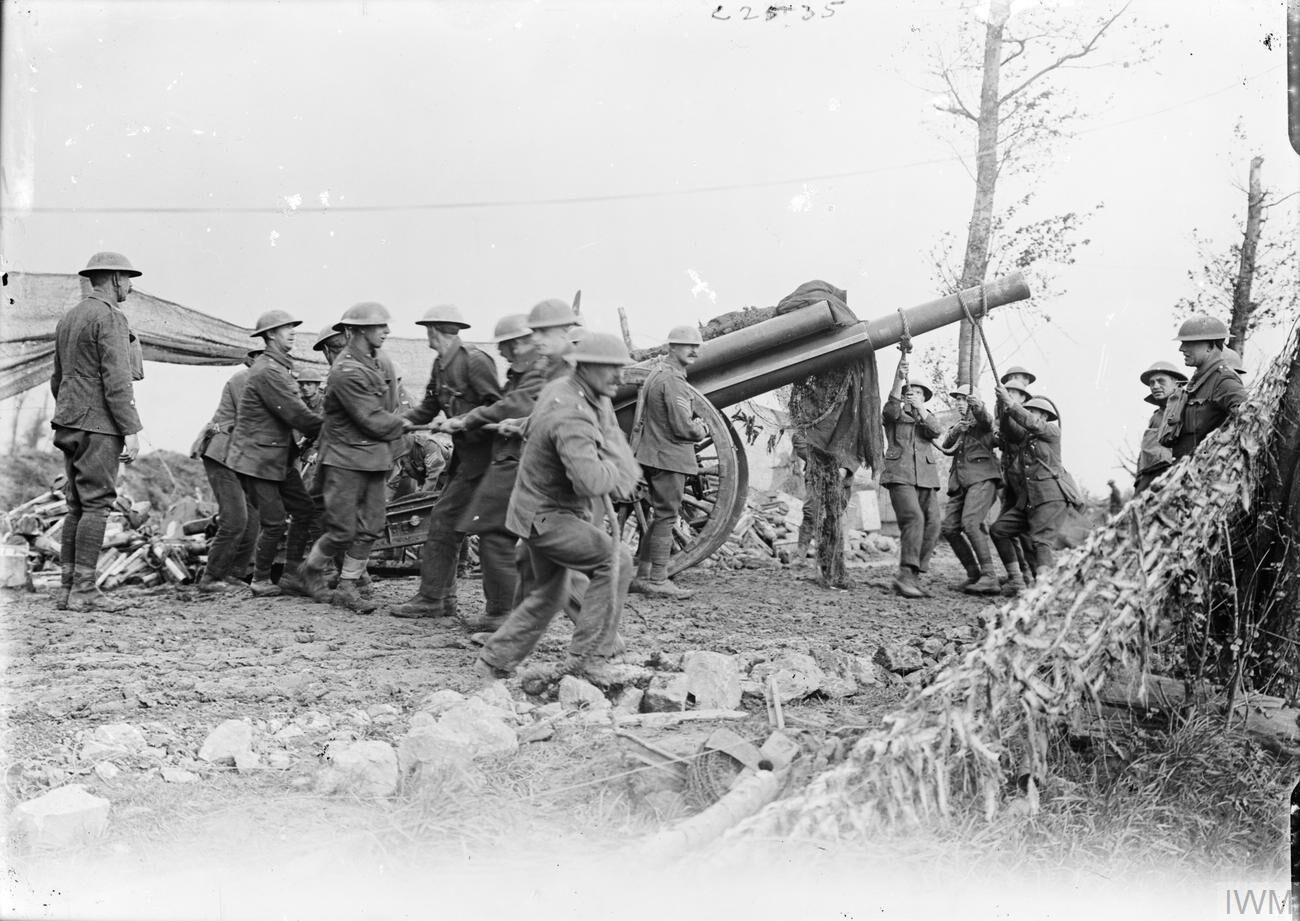
RGA manhandling a 60-pounder gun, 1917.

=== Ypres ===
After its rest, on 6 July 16 HB joined 25th HAG which had just arrived in the Neuve Eglise–Ploegsteert area. It joined Fifth Army, which was moving in to take over the northern part of the Ypres Salient from Second Army for the forthcoming Third Ypres Offensive. However, within a few days 25th HAG was assigned to reserve, and 16th HB transferred to 65th HAG on 8 July. This group was in the 'Canal Bank' sector under XVIII Corps, and 16th HB moved into the positions selected for it by group HQ. Although the weather was too poor for air observation, the group's 60-pdrs began CB shoots by day, continuing at night with short bursts of fire on known battery positions at intervals. 'N' Day, the beginning of the bombardment, was on 16 July. However, the counter-battery fire was less effective than at Messines, and German artillery remained a threat; gas shells fell near 16th HB on 20/21 July. The 60-pdr batteries fired on enemy roads and communications during the night, and from 27 July all the group's guns fired on the trenches and wire around Langemarck. After delays, Z Day for the attack was fixed as 31 July. From midnight to 03.45 on 30/31 July 16th HB and 1/2nd Lancashire HB bombarded two hostile batteries with lachrymatory and lethal gas shells.

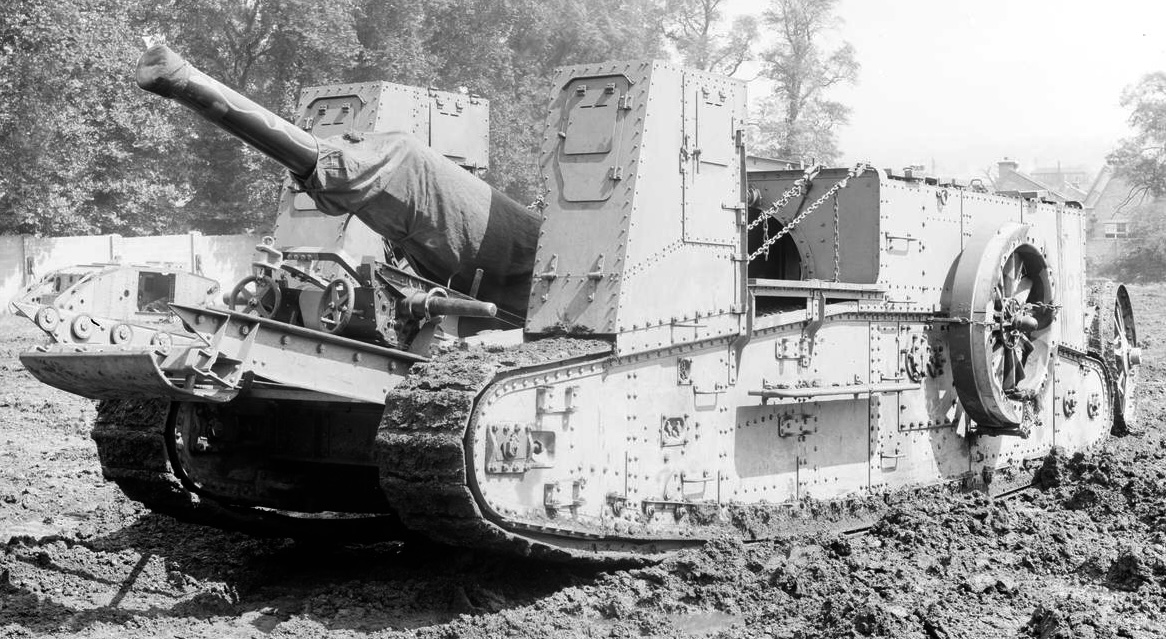
Gun Carrier Mark I carrying a 60-pdr

Zero hour was at 03.50 (sunrise), when the infantry attacked (the Battle of Pilckem Ridge). At first the assault went well, and 65th HAG ordered the commanding officers (COs) of 16th HB, 1/2 Lancs HB and 309th (Honourable Artillery Company) Siege Bty to reconnoitre forward positions. At 11.25 16th HB's waggons were ordered up, and the guns were pulled out of action and limbered up, ready to advance under Maj Cruickshank. However, a serious counter-attack at 17.30 meant that the three batteries had to come back into action in their old positions. Rain set in that night, as 16th HB kept up a slow rate of fire. The COs completed their reconnaissance next day and during 2 August a section of 16th HB managed to reach the old German front line, but a gun carrier tank sent to assist was unable to get the guns into position. 65th HAG carried out a few CB tasks over the next few days and fired in support of small operations by the neighbouring XIX and XIV Corps as Fifth Army prepared for the next phase of the offensive, while the Canal Bank positions were frequently shelled by the enemy. By 10 August 65th HAG was across the Yser Canal, and stationed around Joffre Farm. The second major attack (the Battle of Langemarck) was launched at 04.45 on 16 August, when the infantry advanced about 1,500 yards (1,400 m). That night 16th HB fired gas shells on enemy huts and on 17 August the weather improved enough for aircraft to direct CB shoots. On 19 August the group fired to neutralise enemy batteries while 48th (South Midland) Division carried out an operation against the 'Cockcroft', after which the crews of 16th HB were sent to rest until 25 August. They were back in action on 27 August, firing on enemy rear areas while there was some fighting in the St Julien area. However, the rain returned and the stalled offensive was paused while Second Army took the lead and prepared for a resumption with new tactics when the weather improved.

While XVIII Corps waited, its heavy guns continued to exchange fire with the enemy by day and night. On 19 September a 24-hour bombardment was carried out, and the Battle of the Menin Road Ridge was launched at 05.45 next day. Mud and shellholes hindered XVIII Corps' infantry, but they gained their limited objectives on the Poelcappelle and Gravenstafel spurs. Fine drizzle and the smoke of the barrage prevented observation until 07.00, after which 65th HAG engaged many targets directed by FOOs and aircraft, including heavy counter-attacks that were driven off at 18.00. There was no attempt to push beyond the objectives, but preparations started immediately for the next attack. The artillery duels resumed, 16th HB being shelled with gas all afternoon on 24 September, with minor casualties. The next bound (the Battle of Polygon Wood) on 26 September saw 58th (2/1st London) Division of XVIII Corps attacking up 'Aviatik Ridge' supported by XVIII and V Corps HA; once again, the German counter-attacks were defeated by artillery fire. The preparations then continued, with the 60-pdrs shelling battery positions with gas each night, and 16th SB receiving very heavy retaliation on 28 September. The next phase of this step-by-step offensive was the Battle of Broodseinde on 4 October, starting at 06.00, in which Fifth Army achieved its limited objective line running through Poelcappelle village. 65th HAG's OP on Mont du Hibou sent in good target information, but that at 'High Command Redoubt' could not see. There were no counter-attacks on XVIII Corps' front. 65th HAG 'stood to' at dawn next day in case of counter-attack, but all was quiet. The group prepared to move forward to shorten the range, with 16th Heavy Bty's waggon lines moving closer to the line at Vlamertinge to be ready. The advance resumed at 05.20 on 9 October (the Battle of Poelcappelle). Although the telephone line to 65th HAG's OP was cut by shellfire about 05.00, the CB shooting was successful. 16th Heavy Bty was harassed by an enemy high velocity gun all morning, but suffered no damage. However, the worsening weather meant that XVIII Corps' attacking infantry were exhausted by the approach march through the mud, lost the creeping barrage and were stopped by machine gun fire, making little progress overall. Next day 16th HB attempted to advance two guns to new positions near 'Ascot' communication trench, but they became bogged down. The attack on 12 October (the First Battle of Passchendaele) was launched in heavy rain, and 65th HAG's FOO watched as the infantry struggled in mud until held up by machine gun fire, the heavy guns responding to numerous calls for help. 16th Heavy Bty finally got its remaining guns forward on the night of 14/15 October. Finally, on 20 October, 1/1st Essex HB arrived to relieve 16th HB, taking over its guns in position.

=== Winter 1917–18 ===
The exhausted personnel of 16th HB under Captain J.O. Plunkett marched out of the line to rest, and on 25 October the battery was transferred to 87th HAG at Beuvry, near Béthune, in XI Corps of First Army. On arrival they took over the guns and stores of 1/1st Lancashire HB, whose personnel had been sent north to Fifth Army. The three 2-gun sections were in positions codenamed 'Abide', 'Abundance' and 'Ablaze'. However, on 9 November 87th HAG HQ moved away, and its batteries were reassigned. 16th Heavy Bty temporarily became part of 'X' Group attached to XV Corps. On 7 December 1 HAG arrived from Fourth Army to join XV Corps, and two days later 16th HB was assigned to it. At the time 16th HB had just two of its six guns in action and carried out a few CB map shoots and calibration shots, bombarded Fromelles station, or fired a few rounds at fleeting opportunities. Overall there was little activity during the winter months.

By now HAG allocations were becoming more fixed, and during December 1917 they were converted into permanent RGA brigades once more. 1st HAG became 1st Mobile Bde, RGA, consisting of two 60-pdr batteries and two 6-inch howitzer batteries. 16th Heavy Bty remained with it for the rest of the war. (The other batteries were 21st HB and 49th and 254th Siege Btys (SBs).)

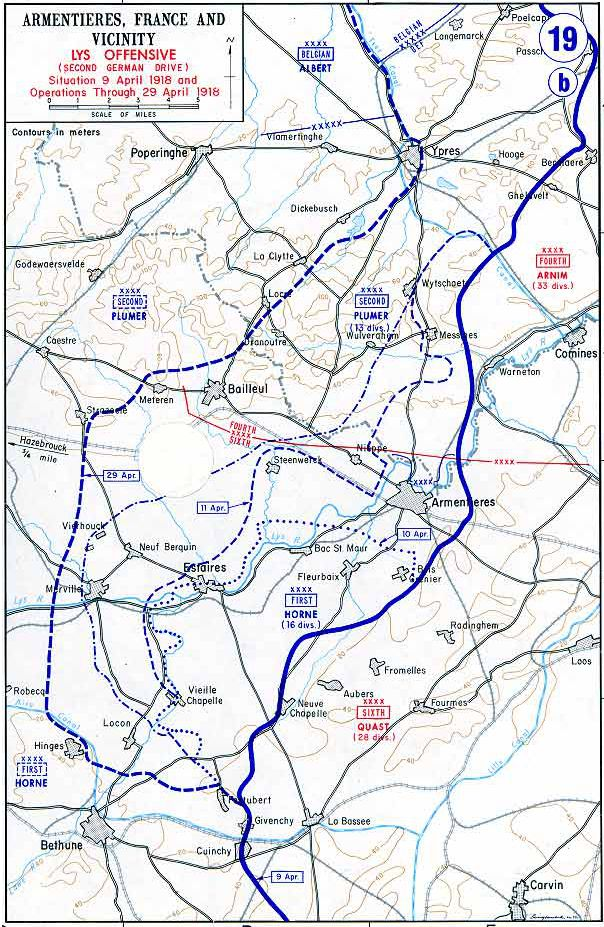
The German Lys offensive, April 1918.

=== Spring Offensive ===
The Germans launched their long-anticipated Spring Offensive at 04.40 on 21 March. First Army's front was not attacked directly, but there was considerable bombardment of its positions for a couple of hours. Daily CB fire from 1st Bde had been increasing over the preceding days, and on 21 March 16th and 21st HBs fired a number of CB neutralisation tasks against hostile batteries, and suffered a number of casualties in return, mostly gassed. Over the following days First Army sent reinforcements to Third Army, which was fighting hard, but this did not affect 1st Bde, whose front remained quiet. Little reorganisation.was required, though 16th Heavy Bty moved two guns from 'Ablaze' to 'Abjure' on 25 March, and two guns across the river on 29 March.

The situation changed dramatically on 9 April when the Germans launched the second phase of their offensive (the Battle of the Lys) against First Army. A heavy bombardment, including much gas, was opened on the Allied lines at 04.15, but morning mist shielded the German movements from view. 1st Brigade's batteries began responding to SOS calls from 55th (West Lancashire) Division at Givenchy on the right of XI Corps' line, firing on prearranged lines. At 09.30 the brigade got word that the enemy had gained lodgements in the line. In fact the two divisions of the Portuguese Expeditionary Corps had collapsed and the enemy was streaming through the line north of 55th (WL) Division, threatening the rear areas. At 13.30 16th HB, 21st HB and 254th SB were ordered to pull back to reserve positions across the La Bassée Canal, but the gun teams of 16th HB failed to reach the forward position (16th HB (North) at 'Abide') in time. Two gun teams of 21st HB tried to get through the enemy fire to pull out the guns, but one team was destroyed and the other suffered too many casualties to do any good and had to retire. Both guns were disabled by their detachments before they escaped. By 14.30 Bde HQ was retiring to Neuf-Berquin, and 16th HB's other guns were blown up before the detachments withdrew. The battery had managed to fire 600 rounds before retiring, and had lost one officer killed, two other ranks (ORs) missing, and one officer and 8 ORs wounded. The stout defence of 55th (WL) Division prevented the Germans from rolling up the line southwards to the canal and Béthune, but the Germans kept advancing through the gap left by the Portuguese. Next day the surviving guns of 1st Bde shelled the crossings over the River Lys, and the town of Estaires once it fell to the enemy. In the afternoon the brigade was ordered back to positions south east of Vieux-Berquin, which it took up that night, and then back to Haverskerque the following night as the enemy took Neuf-Berquin and Merville. The retreat continued on 12 April, with 1st Bde pulled back behind the Forêt de Nieppe, but that day 16th HB received four replacement guns and came back into action west of Morbecque. The guns fired all next day at roads and billets being used by the enemy and at the captured towns of Merville and Vieux-Berquin, continuing with harassing fire after dark. On 14 April two German attacks were caught by the British guns and repulsed with heavy casualties. After that the German offensive ran out of momentum in this sector and on 16 April 16th HB was able to move its guns forward to support the new British line of resistance. The Germans carried out a heavy bombardment of the Givenchy sector on 18 April to cover a last attempt to attack, to which 1st Bde responded with CB and harassing fire, after which the fighting died down on XI Corps' front (though it continued for several days further north).

The batteries of 1st Bde returned to the trench warfare routine of registration, CB shoots and harassing fire on roads and bridges. This continued into the summer and 16th HB and the other batteries received a few reinforcements during June. On 28 June XI Corps carried out the BEF's first offensive operation since the German spring offensives. This aimed to push an outpost line approximately 1 mile (1.6 km) out beyond the Forêt de Nieppe, which had been subject to constant shelling with Mustard gas. The 'Action of La Becque' was carried out by 5th and 31st Divisions, supported by the heavy artillery of XI and XV Corps. 1st Brigade fired in support from 06.00 to 07.45, some of the 60-pdrs using gas shell to neutralise enemy batteries that might interfere. The operation was a complete success.

A 60-pounder moving up during the Hundred Days Offensive, 1918.

=== Hundred Days Offensive ===
During the summer there was some reorganisation of the front, and by August 1 Bde had come under the command of XV Corps in Second Army. Conscious that a British offensive was imminent, and seeking a stronger position, the Germans began a partial withdrawal in front of Second Army on the night of 4/5 August. On the night 11/12 August 29th and 31st Divisions of XV Corps established new posts north of Vieux-Berquin, and the town was captured after some hard fighting between 13 and 17 August. The Allied counter-offensive (the Hundred Days Offensive) had been launched by Fourth Army with the Battle of Amiens on 8 August; now Second Army joined in. XV Corps' line of advance was barred by the Outtersteene and Hoegenacker Ridges, and so its first operation was to capture these, which was carried out by 9th (Scottish) and 29th Divisions on 18 August. 1st Brigade fired its usual harassing tasks until the surprise attack was launched at the unusual hour of 11.00, when it fired a large number of CB neutralisations and several concentrations. 16th Heavy Bty only had four guns in action, the other two being away for repair. That night the 60-pdrs brought down harassing fire on roads, tracks and light railways being used by the Germans, and gas concentrations on their main line of defence. Over the next two days they fired to neutralise enemy batteries as the infantry continued the operation. On 21 August they put down harassing fire on Neuf-Berquin while 29th and 31st Division's patrols worked forwards. 1st Brigade began pushing its guns forward during the nights, including a section of 16th HB.

The infantry continued to push forward, but 1st Bde's horse-drawn guns could not advance further until the roads beyond Vieux-Berquin road were repaired. Four guns of 16th HB were attached to 45th Bde on 30 August, and the battery went forward under that unit's command, supporting 29th Division's advance as the enemy retired from Bailleul. On 4 September the 29th Division recaptured Ploegsteert. On 9 September 16 HB was ordered to destroy as many church spires and chimneys as possible on the north east side of Armentières, to stop them being used by the enemy as OPs. On 12 September the battery was moving forward again as the BEF closed up to the outer works of the Hindenburg Line to which the Germans had withdrawn. It then resumed firing on targets round Armentières, but frequently had to stop because of enemy CB fire. On 14 September it returned to the command of 1st Bde, and by 16 September it had moved its guns to the Westhof road. On 18 September it supported 31st Division in its capture of 'Soyer Farm'.

There was then a pause along the BEF's front as it prepared to assault the Hindenburg Line. During these days 1st Bde's batteries moved all their sections to their most forward positions, covering the Messines Ridge, and selected new positions to take up if there was an advance. As in 1917 the FOOs were established on Hill 63. The heavy guns continued their routine fireplans, including harassing fire on the bridges over the Lys, and hostile artillery fire died away as their batteries were neutralised or destroyed. The Allies began a concerted series of offensives all along the Western Front on 27 September, and Second Army joined in with the Fifth Battle of Ypres next day. XV Corps did not make a set-piece attack, but its heavy artillery bombarded Messines and the ridge to assist X Corps' assault on the left while the 60-pdrs carried out intense CB fire, though the enemy still targeted Hill 63. X Corps' attack was successful and as the Germans retired XV Corps was able to push forward strong patrols, at 15.00 until they were stopped at Ploegsteert Wood. In the evening 31st Division advanced 2 miles (3.2 km) from Hill 63 to threaten the rear of Messines as the Germans fell back methodically. By the end of the day each battery of 1st Bde had pushed a section forward to their selected advanced position. Next day the guns supported XV Corps as it continued advancing towards the Lys, meeting no opposition in Ploegsteert Wood, and the batteries moved their remaining guns into their advanced position. The advance continued on 30 September, hampered by rain and destroyed roads, but the corps' advanced troops reached the Lys and 16th HB was able to advance a section further ahead. On 1–2 October XV Corps' heavy artillery harassed the German retreat through Armentières as the whole of the corps closed up to the river. There was now a pause while Second Army brought up its heavy artillery to support an assault crossing of the Lys. 16th Heavy Bty was able to pull out its guns on 6 October and withdraw to rest.

While 16th Heavy Bty was out of the line, Maj Cruickshank took over temporary command of 1st Bde on 12 October. The battery returned from rest on 17 October, after XV Corps had crossed the Lys. However, until heavy bridges could be built over the river 1st Bde remained on the north side, out of range of the Germans withdrawing to the line of the River Scheldt. On 19 October 1st Bde was able to begin crossing and advance to Tourcoing, where 16th HB went into position on 21 October, sending a section ahead to Dottignies the following day. The guns began firing a few registration rounds on 24–25 October and Major Cruickshank reverted to commanding 16th HB. It pulled a second section into action on 27 October. XV Corps' front along the Scheldt remained quiet, with little artillery fire by either side until 30 October when 1st Bde carried out a number of CB shoots directed by aircraft and balloon as well as by trainee FOOs. Second Army advanced up to the Scheldt further north on 31 October, which 1st Bde supported with CB fire. Second Army was now planning a major crossing of the Scheldt on 11 November; in the meantime 1st Bde supported infantry probes across the river. On 8 November explosions and fires seen behind German lines suggested that they were destroying stores and retreating. Observation aircraft guiding 1st Bde's fire reported flying low over enemy positions without being fired on. By dawn the British infantry were across the river, accompanied by FOOs and liaison officers from 1st Bde, but without bridges the heavy artillery could not follow and the enemy was soon out of range. On 10 November XV Corps was ordered to stand fast and become Second Army's reserve, and at 11.00 on 11 November hostilities were ended when the Armistice with Germany came into force.

On 13 November 16th HB parked its guns at the waggon lines in Lannoy outside Roubaix, and awaited instructions. At first 1st Bde was told that it would be part of the Allied Occupation of the Rhineland and was transferred to III Corps HA. However, the move to Germany was cancelled on 21 November, when the brigade was sent with its batteries to Templeuve, later moving to La Tombe, north of Tournai, and then to Halle, closer to Brussels. In December demobilisation began, initially for mineworkers urgently needed at home, and this process accelerated in early 1919. On 2 March 1919, Maj Cruickshank, who had commanded the battery for two years, left and was attached to 42nd Bde. Most of 16th HB's other officers were posted away and on 27 March 1st Brigade HQ closed down. The remaining cadre of 16th HB was then administered by 49th Bde until it returned to the UK.

== Postwar ==
After the war 16th HB continued in the Regular Army. It was redesignated 29th Bty, RGA, on 19 April 1919 and was absorbed by 31st Bty in VIII Bde, RGA, on 6 January 1920. On 4 May 1920, in India, 31st Bty became 11th Mountain Bty, RGA. 11th Mountain Bty later became 111th Bty of 30th Field Regiment, RA, and served in 4th Division throughout World War II, in France, North Africa and Italy. In 1947 it was converted into a training regiment, 111th Bty was placed in suspended animation in 1954 and finally disbanded in 1962.
