= Thièvres =

Thièvres is the name of two communes in France:

- Thièvres, Pas-de-Calais
- Thièvres, Somme
