= Acheux =

Acheux is part of the name of two communes of the Somme department of northern France:

- Acheux-en-Amiénois
- Acheux-en-Vimeu
