= Acheux British Cemetery =

British military cemetery in the Somme

Coordinates: 50°04′17″N 2°31′27″E

Acheux British Military Cemetery
- Commonwealth War Graves Commission
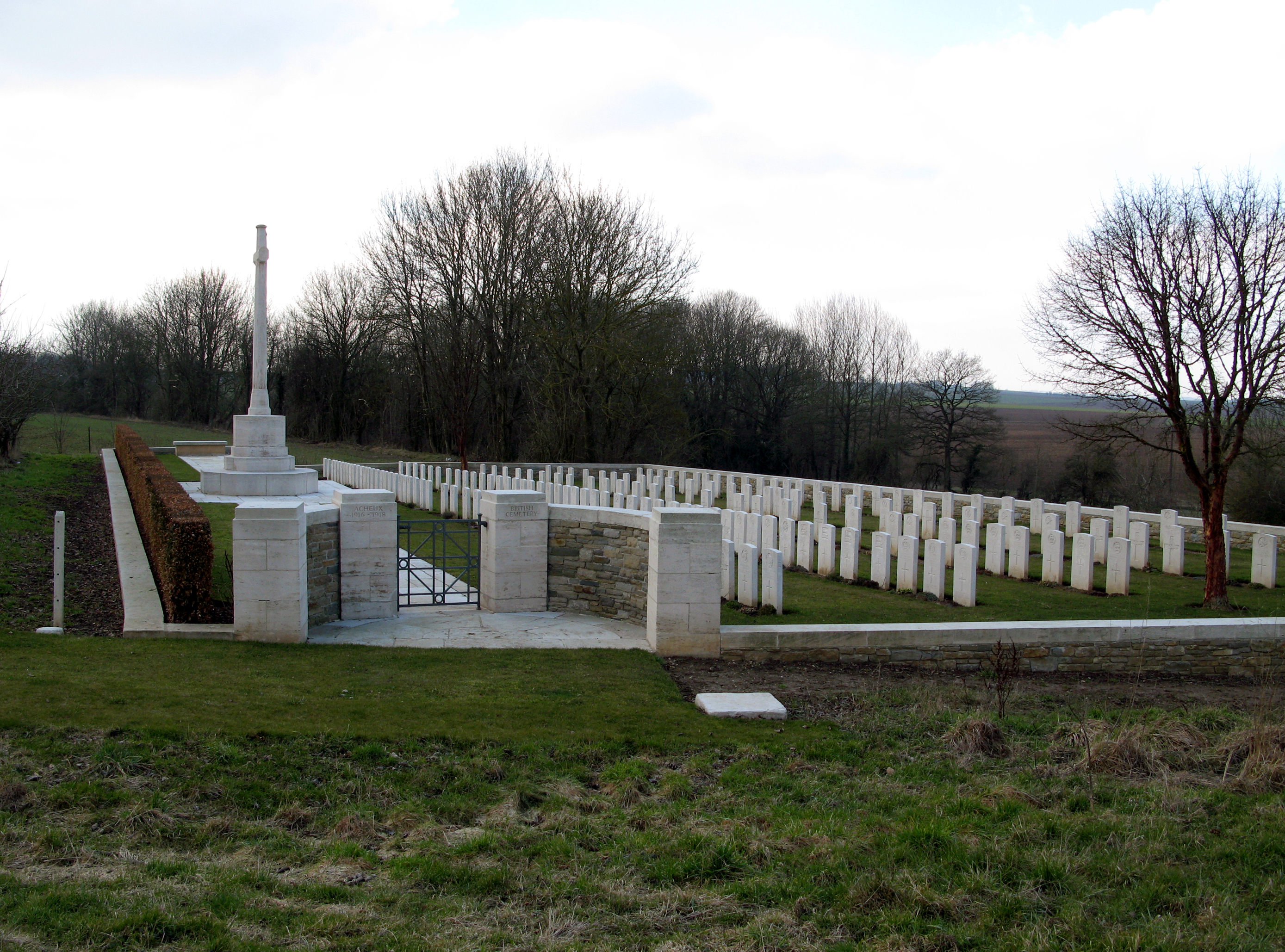
- Used for those deceased July - August 1916; Battle of the Somme; April - August 1918; Spring Offensive
- Location: Acheux-en-Amiénois near Albert, France
- Designed by: N A Rew
- Total burials: 180

Burials by nation
- United Kingdom: 179; Canada: 1

Burials by war
- World War I

The Acheux British Cemetery is a World War I military cemetery located in the French Commune of Acheux-en-Amiénois in the Somme Region.

== Location ==
Acheux-en-Amiénois lies on the main road between Albert and Doullens, the D938. The cemetery is around 10 km from Albert. The cemetery is located around 800m from the Acheux-en-Amiénois church, the Church of Saint Cyr and Saint Juliette, West in the direction towards Lealvillers.

== Background ==
In 1916 the VIII Corps field hospital prepared a collection station in preparation for the Somme Offensive. The first burials occurred in the period between July and August 1916. A small amount of burials then occurred in an 18 month period from August 1916 to early 1918. The remaining graves belonged to those who were killed between April and August 1918, a period in which the German Army had launched the Spring Offensive bringing the front line closer to Acheux-en-Amiénois.

== The Cemetery ==
A 90 m grass path leads from this road to the entrance. The cemetery was designed by Noel Rew and has the shape of a parallelogram with an area of approximately 967 m². It is bordered on three sides by a low natural stone wall, the southern boundary is delimited by a hedge. In a semicircular indentation of the wall there is a metal gate between two columns for access. The Cross of Sacrifice is central to the south wall. The cemetery is maintained by the Commonwealth War Graves Commission.

== Burials ==
There are a total of 180 burials in the cemetery, 179 British Soldiers and 1 Canadian soldier.

=== Burials by Unit ===
Royal Army Ordnance Corps: 1 Royal Army Service Corps: 3 Bedfordshire and Hertfordshire Regiment: 1 Border Regiment: 3 Corps of Canadian Railway Troops: 1 Cheshire Regiment: 1 Devonshire Regiment: 1 Dorsetshire Regiment: 7 Duke of Wellington's (West Riding Regiment): 2 Durham Light Infantry: 5 East Yorkshire Regiment: 6 Essex Regiment: 3 Gloucestershire Regiment: 2 Royal Hampshire Regiment: 1 Hertfordshire Regiment: 1 Kings Own Scottish Borderers: 1 Lancashire Fusiliers: 1 Royal Leicestershire Regiment: 2 Royal Lincolnshire Regiment: 4 Machine Gun Corps (Infantry): 11 Manchester Regiment: 1 Royal Norfolk Regiment: 1 Royal Northumberland Fusiliers: 2	Oxford and Buckinghamshire Light Infantry:1 Rifle Brigade:1 Royal Army Medical Corps: 6 Royal Berkshire Regiment: 2 Royal Dublin Fusiliers: 1 Royal Engineers: 11 Royal Field Artillery: 30 Royal Garrison Artillery: 5 Royal Inniskilling Fusiliers: 1 Royal Irish Regiment: 1 Royal Irish Rifles: 1 Royal Marine Light Infantry: 2 Royal Naval Volunteer Reserve: 2 Royal Sussex Regiment: 8 Royal Welsh Fusiliers: 5 Sherwood Foresters (Notts and Derby Regiment):10 South Wales Borderers: 2 The Buffs (East Kent Regiment): 1 The Queen's (Royal West Surrey Regiment): 6 West Yorkshire Regiment: 10 Wiltshire Regiment: 5 Worcestershire Regiment; 3 York and Lancaster Regiment: 5

=== Notable Burials ===
A deserter by the name of Private William Barry Nelson of the 14th Battalion Durham Light Infantry is also buried here after he was executed by firing squad at dawn on 11 August 1916, aged 22.

==== Military Medal recipients ====
The Military Medal (MM) was a military decoration awarded to personnel of the British Army and other arms of the armed forces, and to personnel of other Commonwealth countries, below commissioned rank, for "acts of gallantry and devotion to duty under fire" on land. It was first established in 1916, with retrospective application to 1914, and discontinued in 1993.

- Corporal A Gibson MM (Royal Field Artillery)
- Bombardier Walter Russel MM (Royal Field Artillery)
- Sapper Frederick George Brown MM (Royal Engineers)

==== Meritorious Service Medal recipients ====
The Meritorious Service Medal (MSM) is a military decoration awarded for distinguished service, or for gallantry, principally by non-commissioned officers of all of the British armed forces.

- Second Lieutenant George Woodburne Howell (Royal Welsh Fusiliers)
