= Grandcourt, Somme =

Grandcourt
- Commune
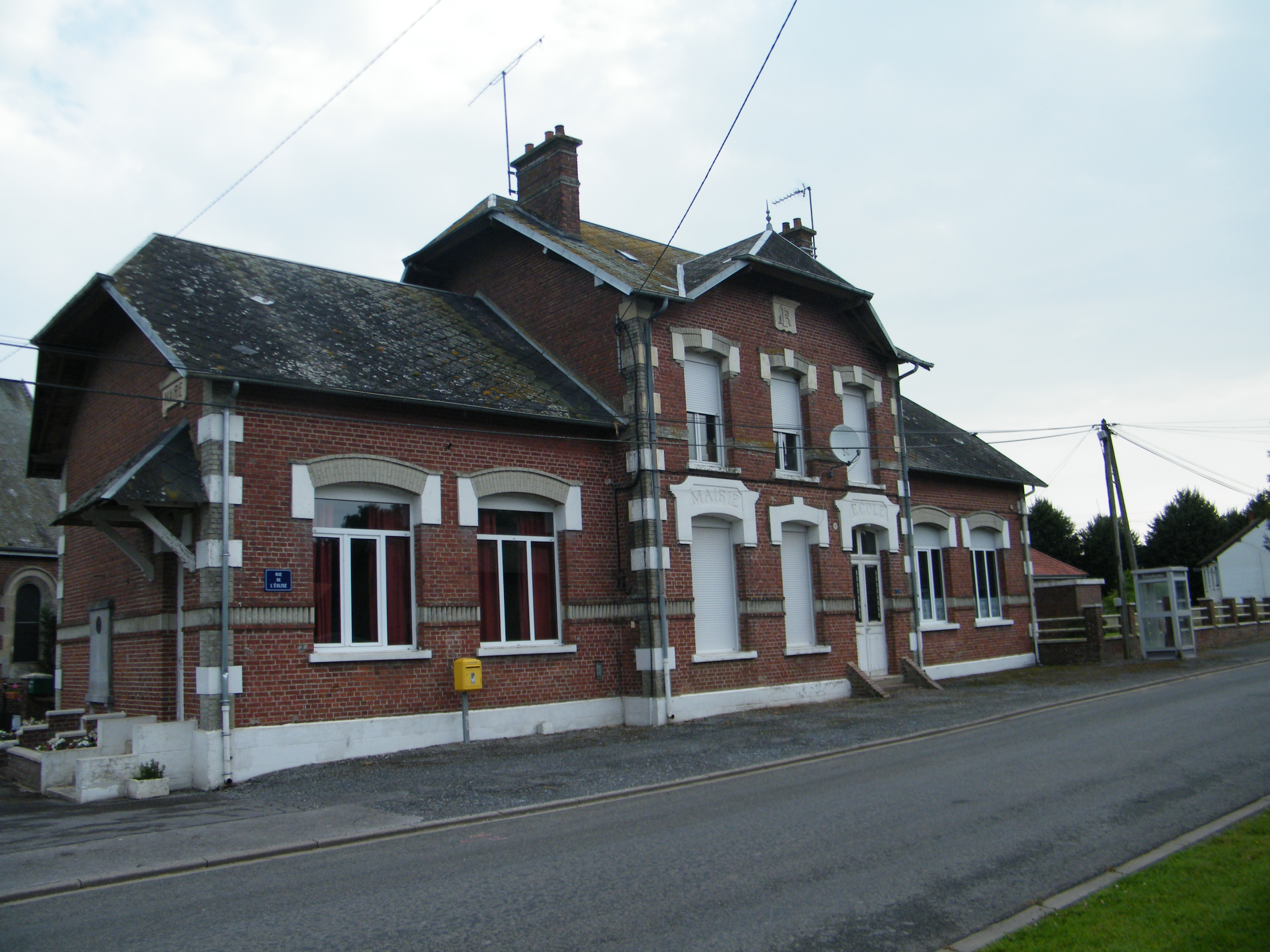
- The town hall and school in Grandcourt
- Location of Grandcourt
- Location within France Location within Hauts-de-France
- Coordinates: 50°04′49″N 2°42′37″E
- Country: France
- Region: Hauts-de-France
- Department: Somme
- Arrondissement: Péronne
- Canton: Albert
- Intercommunality: Pays du Coquelicot

Government
  - Mayor (2020–2026): Maryse Vansuyt
- Area^{1}: 8.38 km^{2} (3.24 sq mi)
- Elevation: 79 m (259 ft)
- Highest elevation: 154 m (505 ft)
- Lowest elevation: 72 m (236 ft)
- Population (2023): 178
  - Density: 21.2/km^{2} (55.0/sq mi)
- Time zone: UTC+01:00 (CET)
  - Summer (DST): UTC+02:00 (CEST)
- INSEE/Postal code: 80384 /80300
- ^{1} French Land Register data, which excludes lakes, ponds, glaciers > 1 km^{2} (0.386 sq mi or 247 acres) and river estuaries.

Grandcourt (French pronunciation: [ɡʁɑ̃kuʁ]) is a commune in the Somme department in Hauts-de-France in northern France.

== Geography ==
Grandcourt is situated on the D151 road, some 25 miles (40 km) northeast of Amiens, on the banks of the Ancre river.

== Population ==
Historical population
| Year | Pop. | ±% p.a. |
|---|---|---|
| 1968 | 194 | — |
| 1975 | 180 | −1.06% |
| 1982 | 190 | +0.78% |
| 1990 | 185 | −0.33% |
| 1999 | 176 | −0.55% |
| 2007 | 165 | −0.80% |
| 2012 | 197 | +3.61% |
| 2017 | 176 | −2.23% |
| 2023 | 178 | +0.19% |
Source: INSEE

== See also ==
- Communes of the Somme department
