= Thièvres, Somme =

Thièvres
- Commune
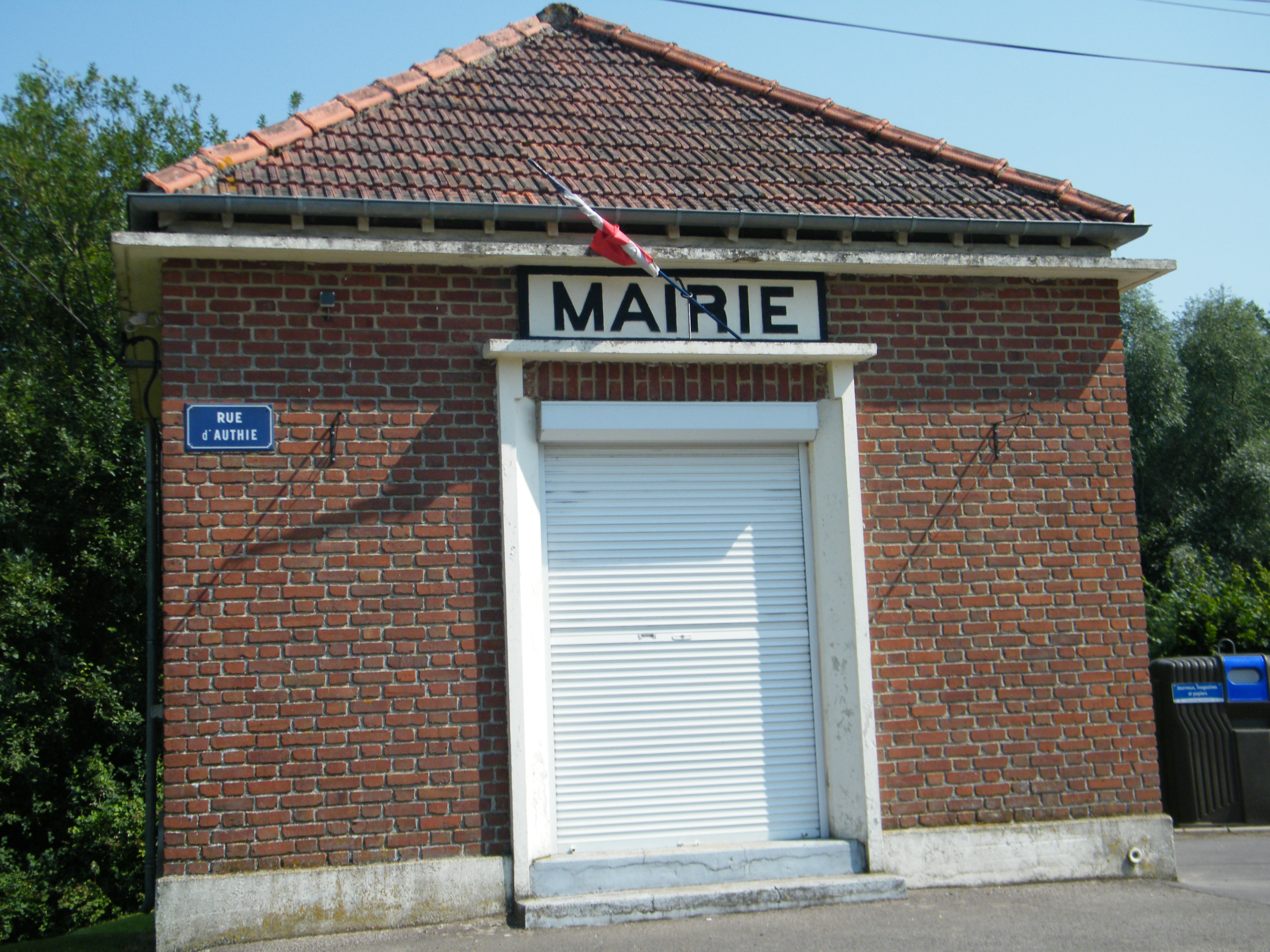
- The town hall in Thièvres
- Location of Thièvres
- Location within France Location within Hauts-de-France
- Coordinates: 50°07′44″N 2°27′15″E
- Country: France
- Region: Hauts-de-France
- Department: Somme
- Arrondissement: Péronne
- Canton: Albert
- Intercommunality: Pays du Coquelicot

Government
  - Mayor (2020–2026): Carine Jouy
- Area^{1}: 1.26 km^{2} (0.49 sq mi)
- Elevation: 73 m (240 ft)
- Highest elevation: 136 m (446 ft)
- Lowest elevation: 70 m (230 ft)
- Population (2023): 54
  - Density: 43/km^{2} (110/sq mi)
- Time zone: UTC+01:00 (CET)
  - Summer (DST): UTC+02:00 (CEST)
- INSEE/Postal code: 80756 /80560
- ^{1} French Land Register data, which excludes lakes, ponds, glaciers > 1 km^{2} (0.386 sq mi or 247 acres) and river estuaries.

Thièvres (French pronunciation: [tjɛvʁ]) is a commune in the Somme department in Hauts-de-France in northern France.

== Geography ==
The commune is situated 17 miles (27 km) north of Amiens, on the D1 road. The village Thièvres is divided between two communes: one part in the Somme department and the other, larger part in the Pas-de-Calais department (Thièvres, Pas-de-Calais). The nineteenth-century church was built in the territory of the Pas-de-Calais.

Thièvres also stands at the confluence of the rivers Authie and Kilienne.

== Population ==
Historical population
Year	Pop.	±% p.a.
1968	70	—
1975	54	−3.64%
1982	55	+0.26%
1990	46	−2.21%
1999	44	−0.49%
2007	52	+2.11%
2012	59	+2.56%
2017	62	+1.00%
2023	54	−2.28%
Source: INSEE

== See also ==
- Communes of the Somme department
