= Male tank =

Category of tanks during World War I

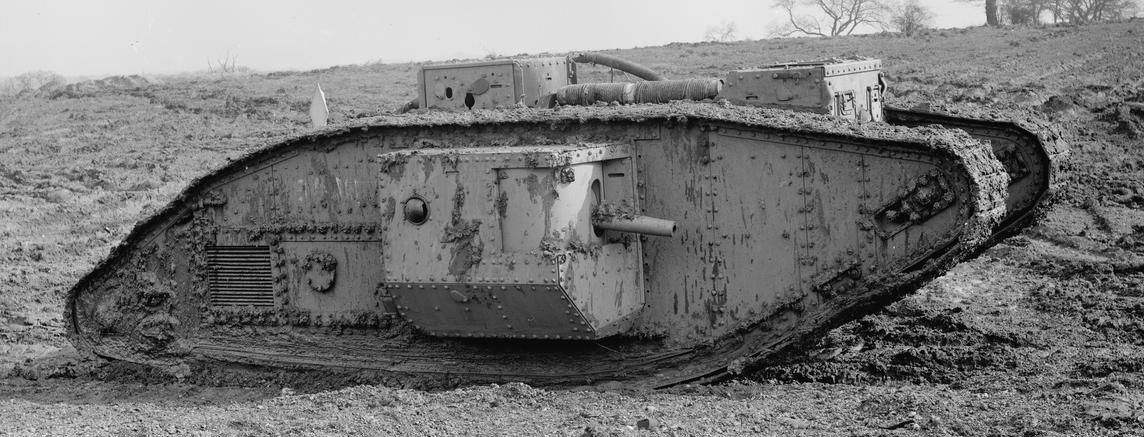
Male Mark V tank showing short 6 pounder gun barrel

The "Male" tank was a category of tank prevalent in the First World War. As opposed to the five machine guns of the female version of the Mark I tank, the male version of the Mark I had a QF 6 pounder 6 cwt Hotchkiss and three machine guns. Ernest Swinton, instrumental in developing the British tank and co-creator of the term "tank" (originally a code word), is credited with inventing these gender-related terms, thinking that the best tank tactics would have the two types attacking in consort.

- Combat weight: 28 tons (28.4 tonnes)
