= Female tank =

Category of tanks during World War I

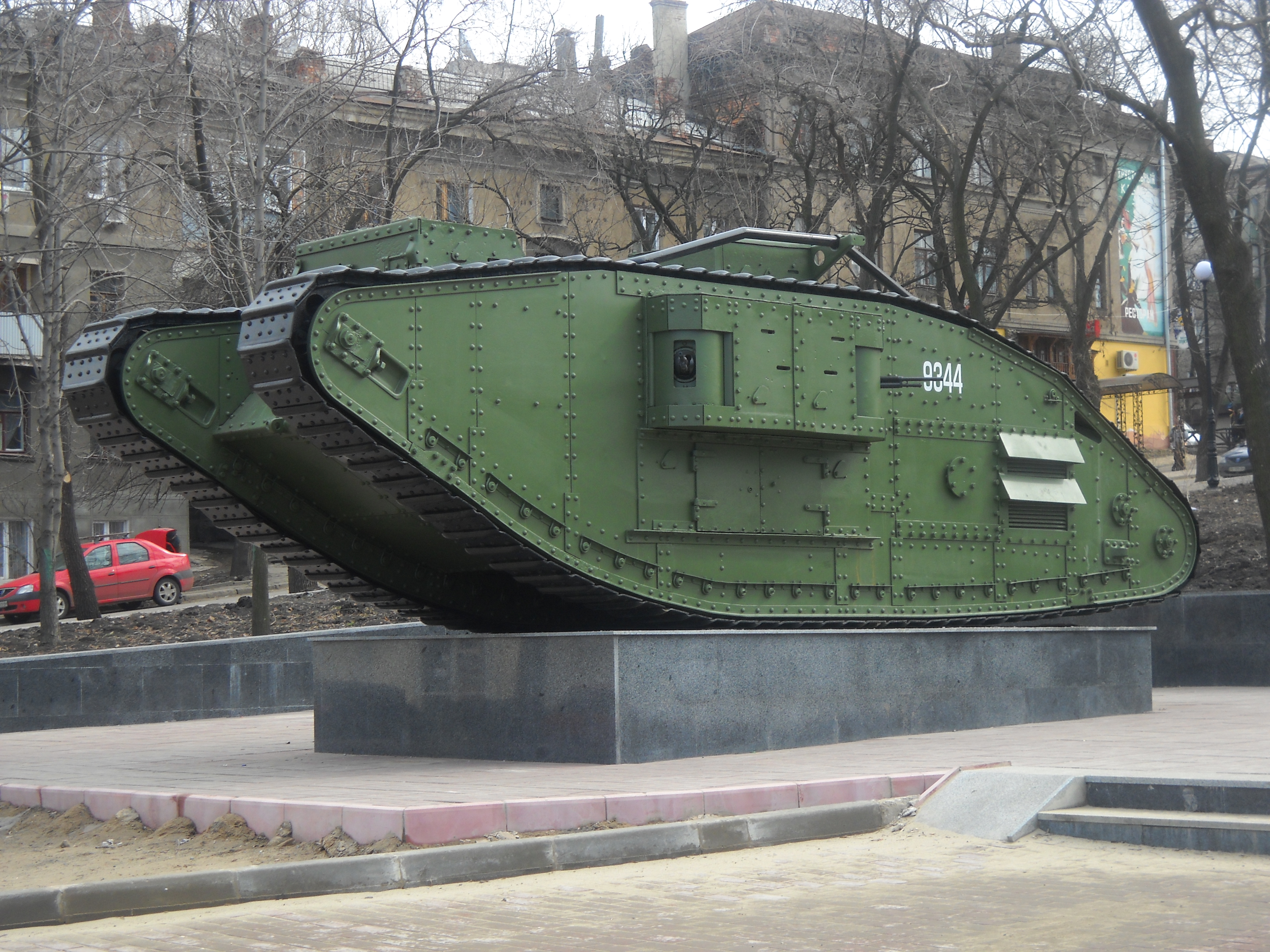
Mark V 'Hermaphrodite' (or 'Composite') Tank. The entry/exit doors can be seen below the "female" sponson.

The "Female" tank was a variation of the British heavy tank deployed during the First World War. It carried multiple machine guns instead of the mix of machine guns and cannons mounted on the "male" tank. Lieutenant-Colonel Ernest Swinton, who played a part in the development of the first British tank and who was co-creator of the term "tank" (originally a code word), is credited with inventing these gender-related terms, thinking that the best tank tactics would have the two types operating in concert.

The prototype, nicknamed "Mother", and the first production models of what would become referred to as the Mark I were designed to carry two six-pounder guns and three machine-guns. Swinton expressed the fear that tanks armed in such a way might be unable to protect themselves from attacks by large numbers of enemy infantry. In April 1916, it was therefore decided that half of the 150 tanks on order should be fitted with machine guns in place of the six-pounders. A new sponson was designed so that the tank could carry two Vickers machine guns, with their cooling jackets protected by armoured sleeves, on each side of the hull. Swinton's idea was that tanks should operate in pairs: a "destroyer" (Swinton's original proposed name was "Machine Gun Destroyer") and a "consort" or "man-killing" tank, so that the two gave mutual protection. He stated that he then assigned the names "male" and "female" respectively. The designation "male" applied to those armed with six-pounder guns, whereas the "female" was the tank equipped only with machine guns.

A consequence of these designations was that the prototype Mother was considered a "male" tank.

The design of the female sponson allowed only a very small door, which made escape from the vehicle extremely difficult. From the Mark II onwards, a new design was introduced that was smaller, incorporated Lewis or Hotchkiss guns, and allowed for much larger doors.

Both male and female tanks took part in the first tank action, on 15 September 1916, at the Battle of Flers-Courcelette, part of the Somme offensive on 15 September 1916.

In 1918 it was decided that tanks should be "hermaphrodite", simultaneously male and female, carrying both heavy armament and lighter machine guns. For the World War I tanks, this was achieved by fitting them with one sponson of each type. A mixed ability armament of the heavy gun and multiple machine guns also became common practice on turreted designs, without sponsons. This has become the standard model for tank designs since World War I and since then the terms "male" and "female" have been disused.

The basic idea underlying the concept of female tanks was widely used in design of light tanks and the first British infantry tanks in the years leading to World War II. Some armour of the World War II period, such as the German Ferdinand tank destroyer, were exclusively "male", having only their heavy gun. These were found to be susceptible to infantry attack and so a defensive machine gun was added in the improved version, the Elefant.

== Bibliography ==
- Swinton, Ernest D. (1933). Eyewitness. Doubleday, Doran & Co. p. 184.
- Smithers, A. J. (1988). A New Excalibur : The development of the Tank, 1909–1939. Grafton. pp. 84–85. ISBN 978-0-58607-325-4.
- Stern, Albert G. (1919). Tanks, 1914–1918: The log-book of a Pioneer. Hodder & Stoughton. p. 76.
- Fletcher, David (1992). Landships : British tanks in the First World War. HMSO. p. 14. ISBN 978-0-11290-409-0.
