= Acheux-en-Amiénois =

Commune in Hauts-de-France, France

- Commune
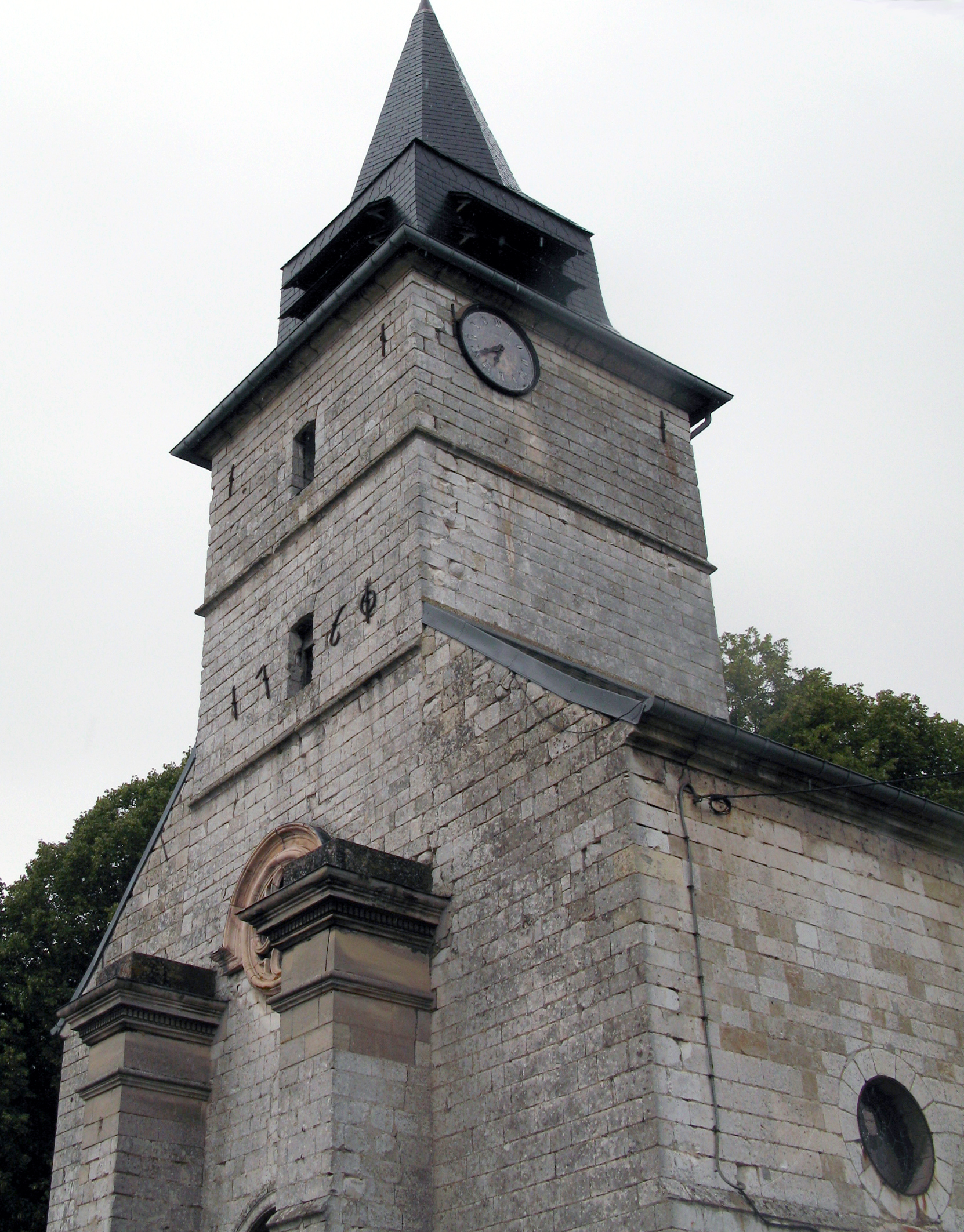
- The church of Acheux-en-Amiénois

- Coat of arms
- Location of Acheux-en-Amiénois
- Location within France Location within Hauts-de-France
- Coordinates: 50°04′27″N 2°32′01″E
- Country: France
- Region: Hauts-de-France
- Department: Somme
- Arrondissement: Péronne
- Canton: Albert
- Intercommunality: Pays du Coquelicot

Government
  - Mayor (2020–2026): Annie Lemaire
- Area^{1}: 7.07 km^{2} (2.73 sq mi)
- Elevation: 154 m (505 ft)
- Highest elevation: 152 m (499 ft)
- Lowest elevation: 118 m (387 ft)
- Population (2023): 590
  - Density: 83/km^{2} (220/sq mi)
- Time zone: UTC+01:00 (CET)
  - Summer (DST): UTC+02:00 (CEST)
- INSEE/Postal code: 80003 /80560
- ^{1} French Land Register data, which excludes lakes, ponds, glaciers > 1 km^{2} (0.386 sq mi or 247 acres) and river estuaries.

Acheux-en-Amiénois (French pronunciation: [aʃø ɑ̃.n‿amjenwa], lit. 'Acheux in Amiénois'; Picard: Acheux-in-Amiénoé) is a commune in the Somme department in Hauts-de-France in northern France.

== Geography ==
The commune is a farming village found at the junction of the departmental roads D938 and D114.

== History ==
The earlier spelling of the name Acheux was either Aceu or Acheu (from the charter of the foundation of the nearby abbey of Corbie). It comes from the Celtic Achad that meant "cultivated field". The town of Acheux is ancient. It certainly existed in Roman times, where a fort was established, comprising ditches and palisades, to protect it from attacks by the Atrebates, a Gaulish tribe, after whom Arras is named.

Within the Commune is the Acheux British Military Cemetery containing war graves from the First World War.

== Population ==
Historical population
Year	Pop.	±% p.a.
1968	498	—
1975	464	−1.01%
1982	425	−1.25%
1990	424	−0.03%
1999	514	+2.16%
2007	535	+0.50%
2012	608	+2.59%
2017	593	−0.50%
2023	590	−0.08%
Source: INSEE

== Places and monuments ==
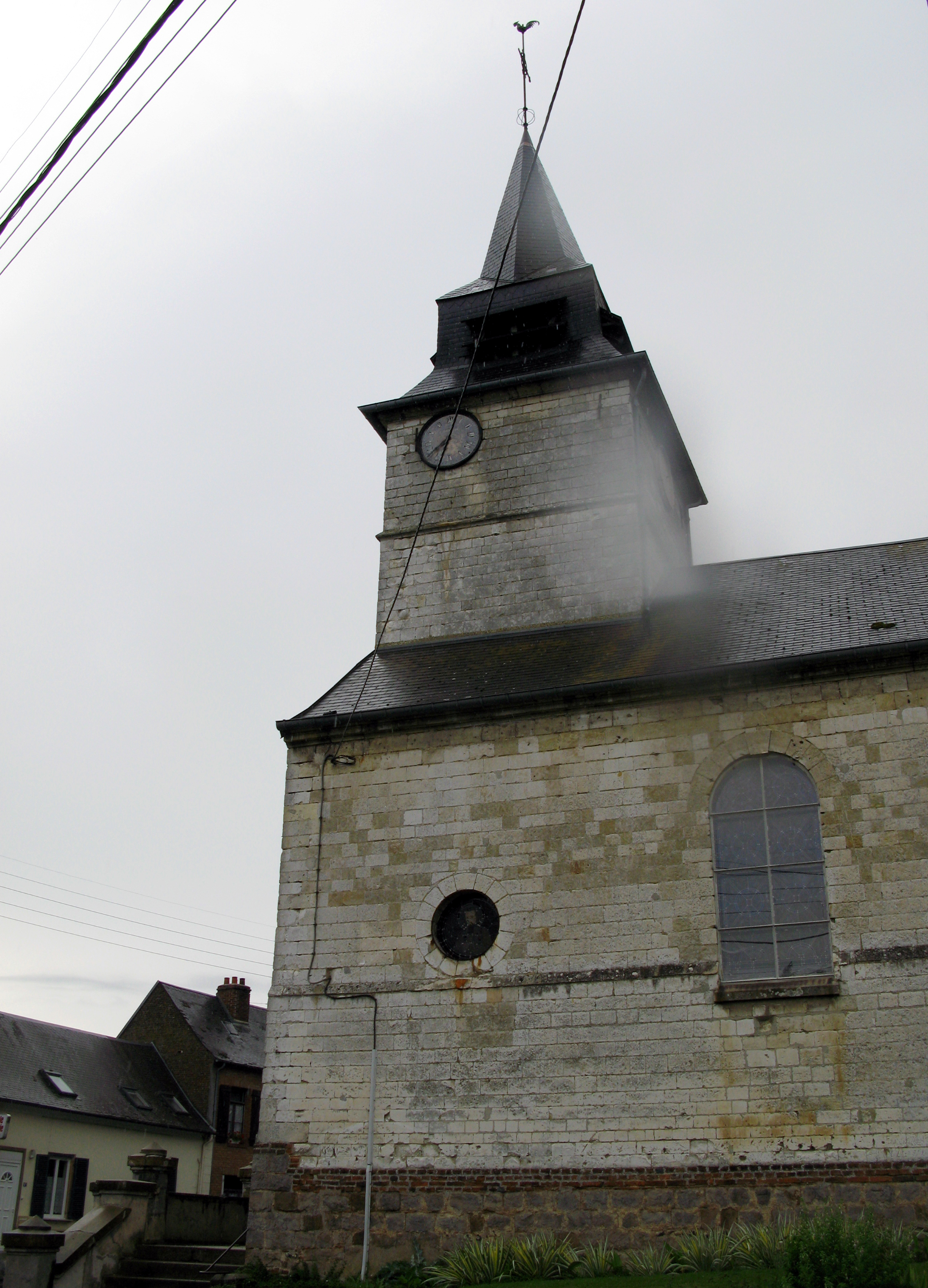
The church at Acheux

- The church of Acheux was built in 1760 as indicated on the inscription on the font. It is dedicated to Saint Cyr and Saint Juliette.
- The castle was constructed in the 11th century and had seven towers, of which two remain. The wall was surrounded by a dry moat filled with brambles and thorns, giving the nickname of "Thorn Manor".

== See also ==
Communes of the Somme department
