= Thièvres, Pas-de-Calais =

Thièvres
- Commune
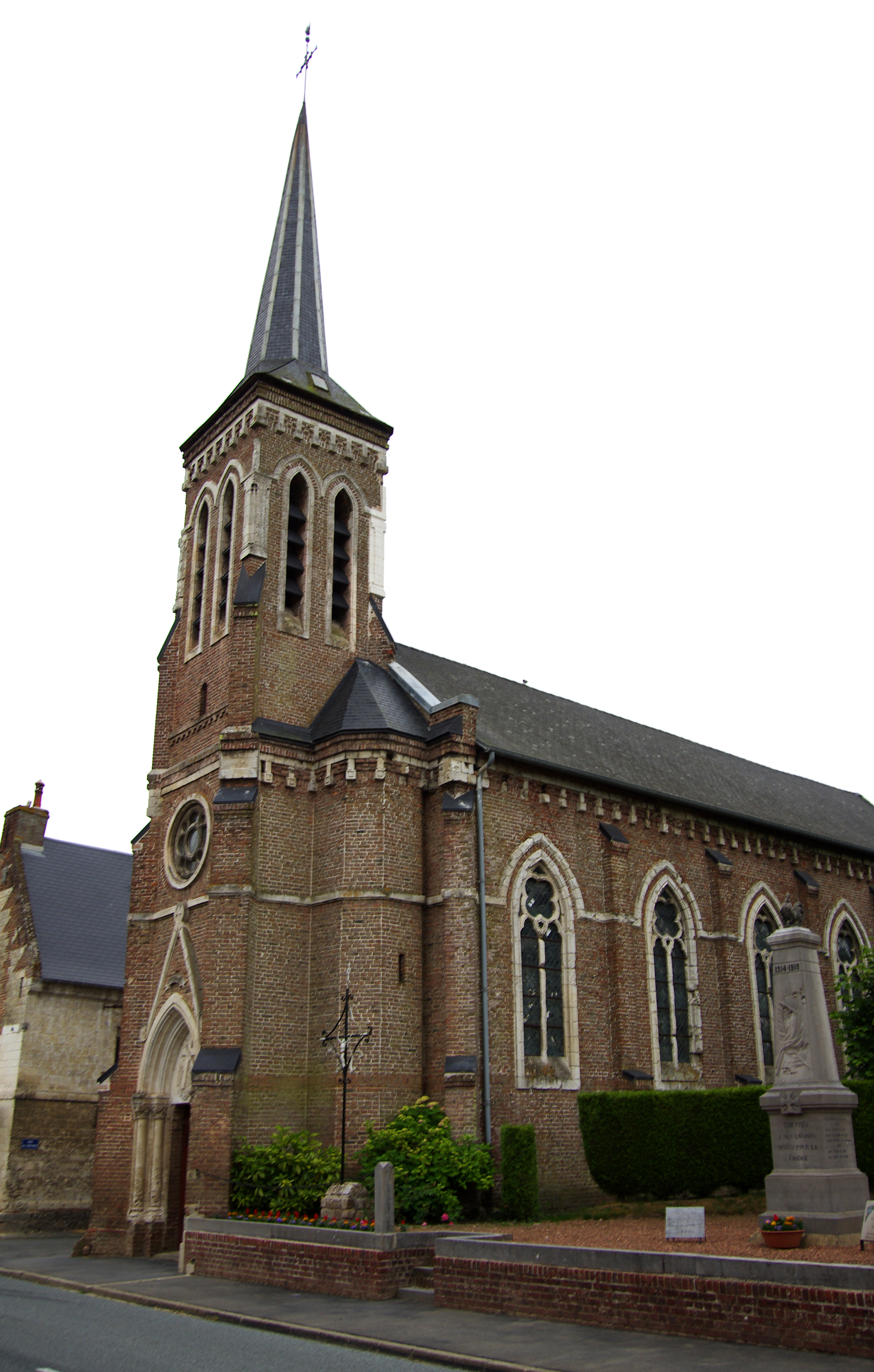
- The church of Thièvres

- Coat of arms
- Location of Thièvres
- Location within France Location within Hauts-de-France
- Coordinates: 50°07′44″N 2°27′15″E
- Country: France
- Region: Hauts-de-France
- Department: Pas-de-Calais
- Arrondissement: Arras
- Canton: Avesnes-le-Comte
- Intercommunality: CC Campagnes de l'Artois

Government
  - Mayor (2020–2026): Chantal Dufresne
- Area^{1}: 1.26 km^{2} (0.49 sq mi)
- Elevation: 73 m (240 ft)
- Highest elevation: 136 m (446 ft)
- Lowest elevation: 70 m (230 ft)
- Population (2023): 96
  - Density: 76/km^{2} (200/sq mi)
- Time zone: UTC+01:00 (CET)
  - Summer (DST): UTC+02:00 (CEST)
- INSEE/Postal code: 62814 /62760
- ^{1} French Land Register data, which excludes lakes, ponds, glaciers > 1 km^{2} (0.386 sq mi or 247 acres) and river estuaries.

Thièvres is a commune in the Pas-de-Calais department in the Hauts-de-France region of France 22 miles (35 km) southwest of Arras. The village of Thièvres is divided between two communes: one part in the Pas-de-Calais department and the other, smaller part in the Somme department (Thièvres, Somme).

== Population ==
Historical population
Year	Pop.	±% p.a.
1968	127	—
1975	106	−2.55%
1982	95	−1.55%
1990	127	+3.70%
1999	132	+0.43%
2007	119	−1.29%
2012	123	+0.66%
2017	123	+0.00%
2023	96	−4.05%
Source: INSEE

== See also ==
- Communes of the Pas-de-Calais department
