= Tanks in the German Army =

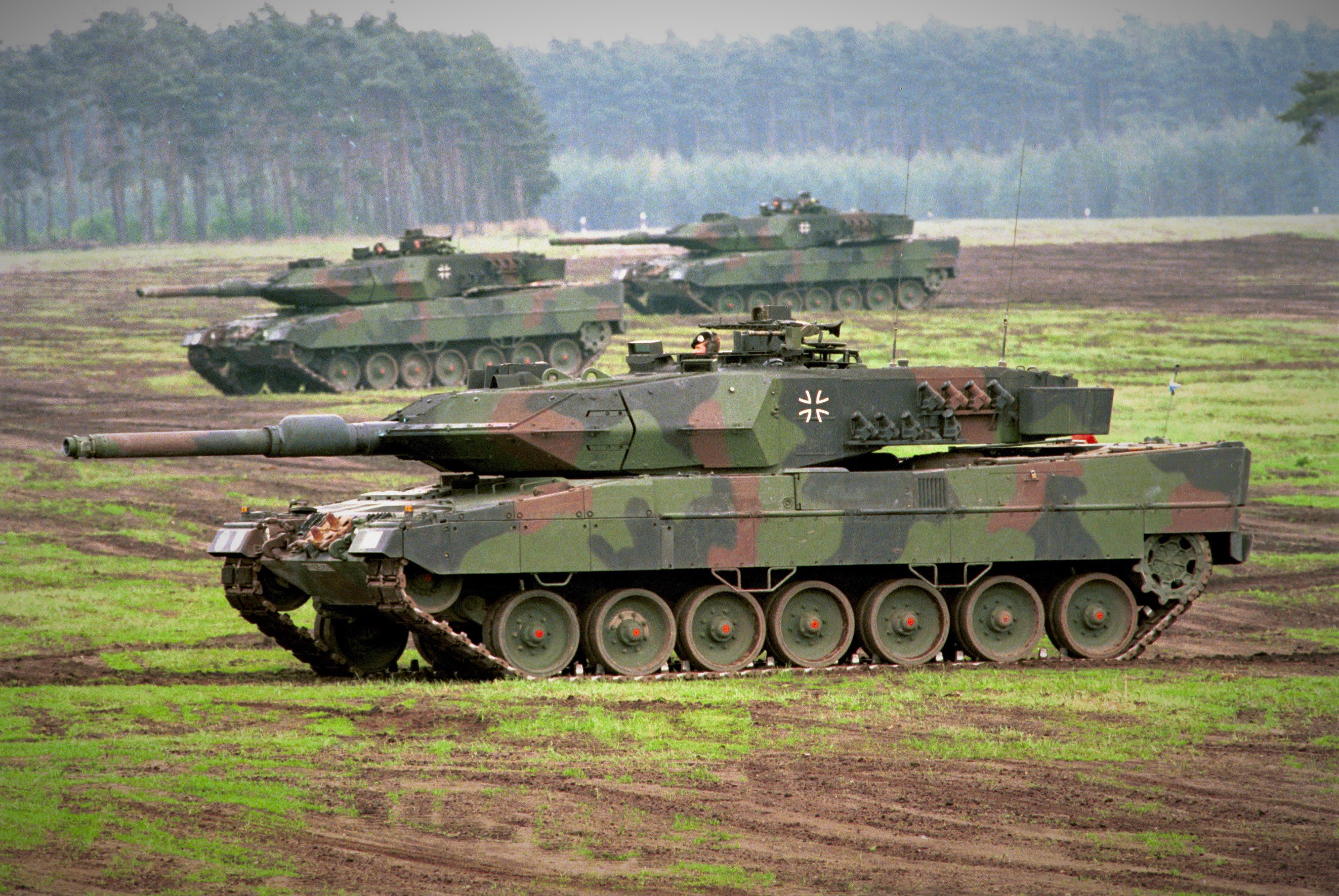
Leopard 2A5s of the German Army (Heer), 1996

This article deals with the tanks (German: Panzer) serving in the German Army (Deutsches Heer) throughout history, such as the World War I tanks of the Imperial German Army, the interwar and World War II tanks of the Wehrmacht and Waffen-SS, the Cold War tanks of both West German and East German armies, all the way to the present day tanks of the German Army of Bundeswehr.

== Overview ==
The development of tanks in World War I began as an attempt to break the stalemate that trench warfare had brought to the Western Front. The British and French both began experimenting in 1915, and deployed tanks in battles from 1916 and 1917 respectively. The Germans, on the other hand, were slower to develop tanks, mainly concentrating on anti-tank weapons.

The German response to the modest initial successes of the Allied tanks was the A7V, which, like some other tanks of the period, was based on caterpillar tracks like those found on the American Holt Tractors. Initially unconvinced that tanks were a serious threat, the German High Command only ordered just twenty A7Vs, which took part in a handful of actions between March and October 1918. They suffered from numerous design faults, and Germany actually used captured British tanks more than A7Vs. As it became clear that the tank can play a significant role on the battlefield, Germany began working on designs for both heavy and light tanks, but only a small number of prototypes were completed by the end of the War.

After the Armistice, all tanks in German hands were confiscated. Almost all were eventually scrapped, and the various postwar treaties forbade the former Central Powers from both building and or possessing tanks.

On 30 January 1933, Adolf Hitler was appointed the Chancellor of Germany. Although he initially headed a coalition government, he quickly eliminated his government partners. He then ignored the restrictions imposed by the Treaty of Versailles (1919) and then began rearming the German army, and eventually approving the development of many German tank designs that he was shown.

The German Army first used the Panzer I light tank, along with the Panzer II, but the main tank force were the both medium Panzer IIIs and Panzer IVs which were released in 1937. Then the Panzer IV became the backbone of Germany's panzer force and the early main power behind the blitzkrieg. During the invasion of Russia in 1941 or Operation Barbarosa, the Germans encountered the famous and technologically advanced Soviet T-34 tanks. This led Germany to develop the Panther or Panzer V in response with its 75-millimetre (2.95 in) gun that could penetrate the new Soviet tanks. Germany also developed the heavy class tank Tiger I or Panzer VI, it was released in 1942. And then the Tiger-1 was soon joined by the Tiger II, also known as King Tiger, but too few were produced (492) to impact the war in any discernible way.

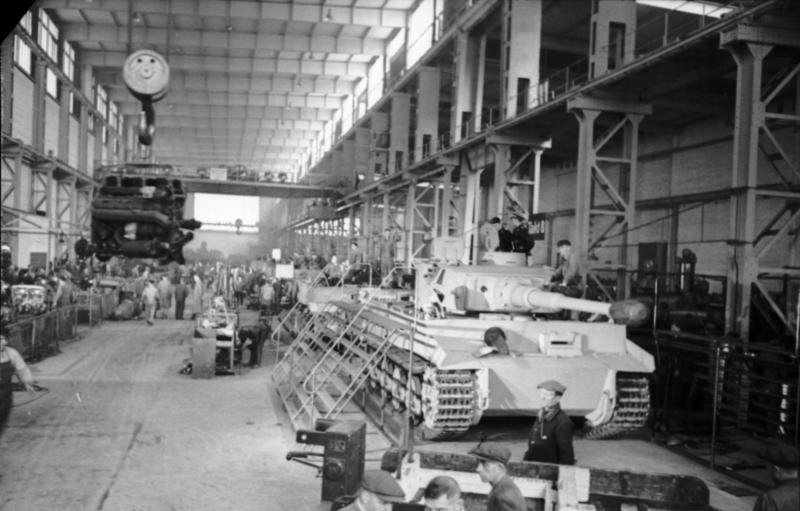
Tiger I on a production line. 1944

One note of interest was the poor reliability of the German tanks such as the Panther and Tiger; constant mechanical failures in its transmission, And it meant that German tank divisions were rarely able to field a full complement of tanks and were often diminished below 50% combat readiness. The book The Last Battle by Cornelius Ryan makes mention of the 7 million foreign workers who were forcibly brought into Germany to work in the factories and businesses — many of them in military assembly lines. Ryan specifically writes about these foreign workers in German tank manufacturing, who sabotaged every part they could and may have contributed to the rate of breakdown of German tanks in the field. This especially affected tanks built later in the war (such as the Panther and Tiger) when forced labor had replaced German manpower in their manufacture.

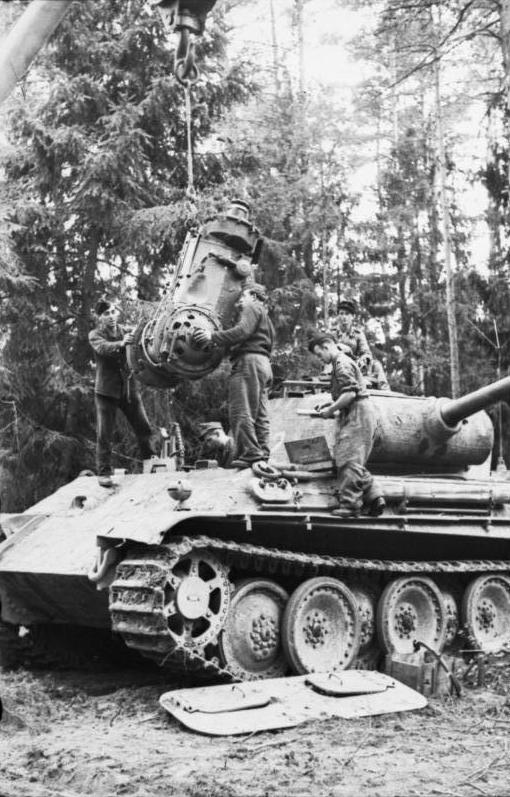
Repair of the transmission of a Panther

and in the Battle of Kursk, when the newly arrived Panther tanks moved into their assembly areas, 45 out of 200 experienced mechanical problems requiring repair. A good example was the Großdeutschland Division, which had a brigade of two battalions of new Panther Ausf. D tanks come under its operational control before the battle. After the launch of Operation Citadel, the new Panthers were plagued by technical problems, suffering from engine fires and mechanical breakdowns, many before reaching the battle, in which the division was heavily engaged. Also, it may have affected the Großdeutschland Division's non-role in the ensuing the massive tank Battle of Prokhorovka, in which it was held in reserve, its Panther tanks not engaging as most were broken down by the time the battle started.

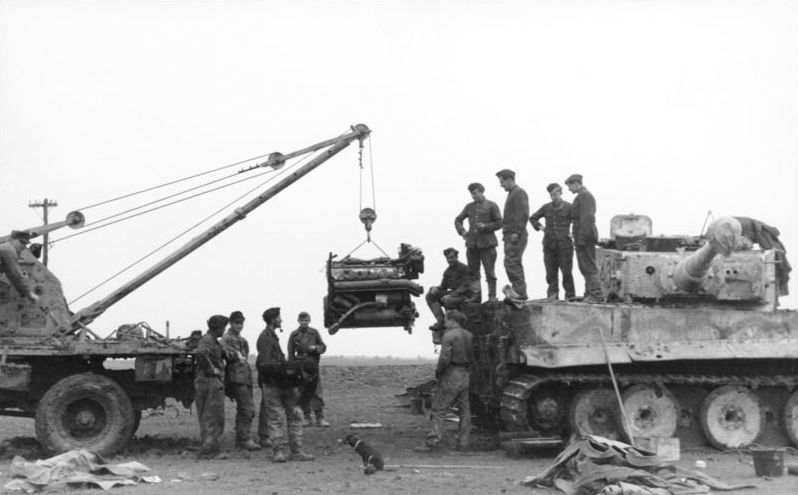
Tiger undergoing engine repair

And the Tiger's reliability problems were well known and documented; Tiger units frequently entered combat understrength due to breakdowns. It was rare for any Tiger unit to complete a road march without losing vehicles due to breakdown.

German factories and industry were devastated by the end of World War II, but by the 1950s, the nation began to look at designing new tanks. The next tank design started as a collaborative project between Germany and France in the 1950s, but the partnership ended, and the final design was ordered by the Bundeswehr, production of the German Leopard 1 starting in 1965. In total, 6,485 Leopard I tanks were built, of which 4,744 were battle tanks and 1,741 were utility and anti-aircraft variants, not including eighty prototypes and pre-series vehicles. The Leopard quickly became a standard of European forces, and eventually served as the main battle tank in Germany. It was superseded by the Leopard 2.

== German design and development ==
German tank development can be traced back to 1911, when Austrian Oberleutenant Gunther Burstyn proposed a design for "motor vehicle gun" (Motorgeschütz) with a turret. He patented his design in 1912 in Germany but it never progressed beyond paper.

=== World War I ===
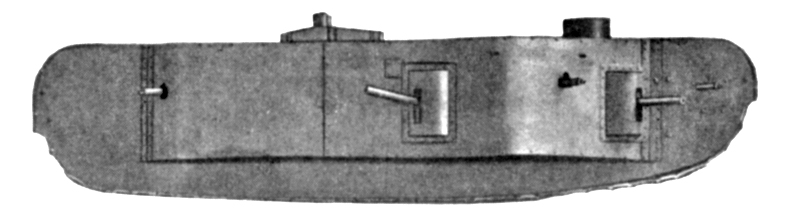
The "K" Panzerkampfwagen (front of the vehicle is at right)

After British tanks went into action at the Battle of Flers–Courcelette on 15 September 1916, the German Army immediately demanded their own landships. Following the appearance of the first British tanks on the Western Front, the War Ministry formed a committee of experts from leading engineering companies, answerable to the Allgemeines Kriegsdepartement, Abteilung 7, Verkehrswesen ("General War Department, 7th Branch, Transportation"). The project to design and build the first German tank was placed under the direction of Joseph Vollmer, a leading German automobile designer and manufacturer. He was chosen to design the World War I German tanks A7V and the Großkampfwagen (K-Wagen). The K-Wagen was a German super-heavy tank, two prototypes of which were almost completed by the end of World War I. The A7V tank which entered the war, was known as the Sturmpanzerwagen A7V, named after the committee that oversaw its development. It weighed around 30 long tons (30 t), capable of crossing ditches up to 1.5 metres (4 ft 11 in) wide, have armaments including cannon at front and rear as well as several machine-guns, and reach a top speed of at least 12 kilometres per hour (7.5 mph). The running gear was based on the Holt tractor, parts for which were copied from examples borrowed from the Austrian army. After initial plans were shared with the Army in December 1917, the design was extended to be a universal chassis which could be used as a base for both a tank and unarmoured Überlandwagen ("Overland vehicle") cargo carriers. Powered by two Daimler engines, the tank was first demonstrated in the German spring offensive of 1918. Internally, the Sturmpanzerwagen was cramped, smelly and noisy. It required a crew of 18 to man the machine to full potential. With the 57 mm (2.24 in) main gun at front, internal operators had access to two 7.92 mm (0.312 in) machine guns at the rear along with a further four along the sides—two to a side. Each machine gun needed two personnel per gun - a firer and an ammunition re-supplier. The engine sat in the lower middle of the design with the main gear components resting under the rear. A crew of two operated the front 57 mm (2.24 in) main gun, one to aim and fire while the other loaded it. Two drivers sat in the upper center bulge area operating a steering wheel and lever controls. Stowage was allotted for individual crew weapons in the form of rifles. During final design, a rear-facing cannon was removed and the number of machine-guns was increased to six. Grab ropes were provided throughout as the design had plenty of headroom space for the average soldier, though travel made for an uneasy and overall bumpy ride.

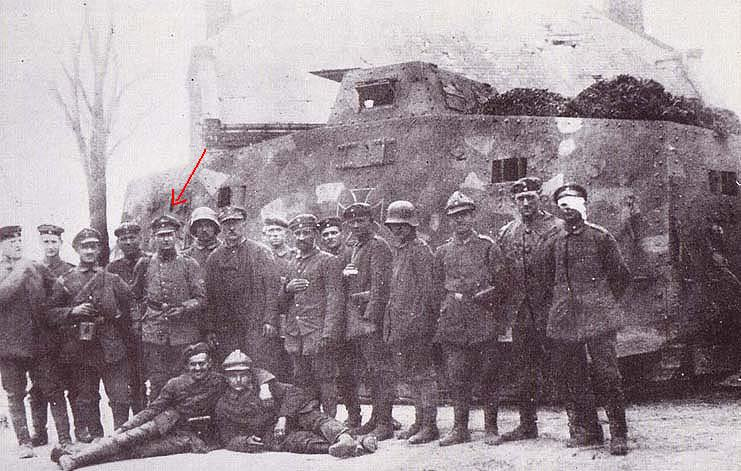
German A7V called the Alter Fritz Fifth from left Leutnant Ernst Volckheim (Arrowed)

In theory, the idea of an armored box with a lot of weapons seemed sound. In practice, however, the large design was far from perfect. The vehicle was top-heavy, making it impractical to be used on uneven terrain. It was slow as well, often meaning that it could be outpaced by the very infantry it was to assist. The short tracks of the tractor system also made the vehicle relatively unsafe and uncontrollable in some cases. If the A7V has one saving grace, it was that the all-around armor protection for the crew was second to none - even when compared to the British designs - with over an inch in some areas. Twenty of these tanks were produced, and the first of these were ready in October 1917. The A7V was first used at St Quentin on 21 March 1918. Although some of its features, such as the sprung tracks and the thicker armour, made it better than British tanks at that time, the A7V was less successful as a battle vehicle. The main problems concerned its mechanical reliability and the difficulty it encountered crossing enemy trenches. Three of the five tanks committed broke down at St Quentin. At the Second Battle of Villers-Bretonneux a British tank disabled one A7V and drove off two more.

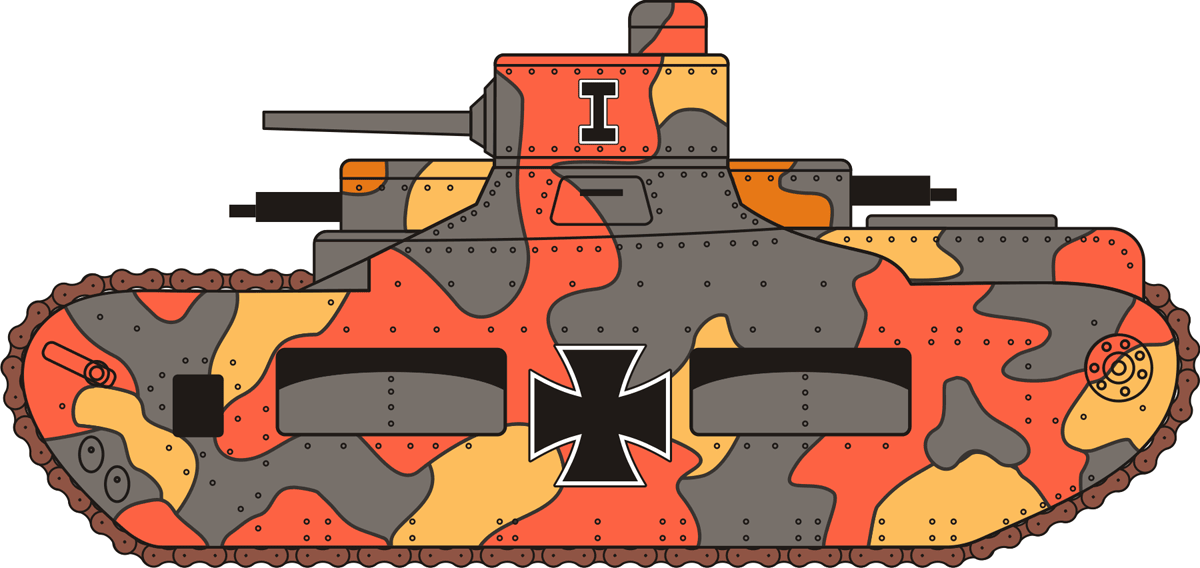
Sturmpanzerwagen Oberschlesien

By the time of the arrival of the Sturmpanzerwagen, the Germans had already successfully developed their own brand of armor-piercing projectile as well. Near the end of the First World War, it was clear that the A7V was a failure, being too slow and clumsy in action and slow to build. Therefore, it was decided that a lighter tank was required which could spearhead assaults and which could be mass-produced and was called the Sturmpanzerwagen Oberschlesien.

Thirteen companies bid for the contract and in the middle of 1918 construction of a design by Captain Müller was assigned to the Oberschlesien Eisenwerk of Gleiwitz, which had partially completed two prototypes by October 1918. It was a radical design for a fast-moving, lightly armored assault tank.

The Oberschlesien included a track which was placed under the tank and only wrapped around half of it. The design sacrificed armor for the sake of speed and only required a 180 horsepower (130 kW) engine for the 19 long tons (19 t) body, giving it a projected ground speed of 14 kilometres per hour (8.7 mph).

The tank featured such advanced features as a main cannon mounted on top of the tank in a central revolving turret, separate fighting and engine compartments, a rear-mounted engine and a low track run. Neither the ordered test models nor the improved Oberschlesien II already planned were finished before the end of the war.

In the end, time running out for the creation of new designs, the limitations of the A7V plan, and being a part of the losing side of a war while fighting on the defensive was adding high levels of tension to the Oberschlesien's production. These disadvantages and the pressure-filled environment are said to be what led to a very average first creation within the realm of tank design for the Germans.

=== Interwar period ===
The post-World War I Treaty of Versailles of 1919 prohibited the design, manufacture, and deployment of tanks within the Reichswehr. The victors pushed for severe restrictions on the country's war-making capabilities and Germany took the brunt of the blame to the west and was forced into signing the Treaty in June 1919. Limitations for the land army included a 100,000-strong infantry army, absolutely no tanks of any kind and just a few armored vehicles for spot duty. The German Army became a shell of its former self. Paragraph Twenty-four of the treaty provided for a 100,000-mark fine and imprisonment of up to six months for anybody who "[manufactured] armoured vehicles, tanks or similar machines, which may be turned to military use".

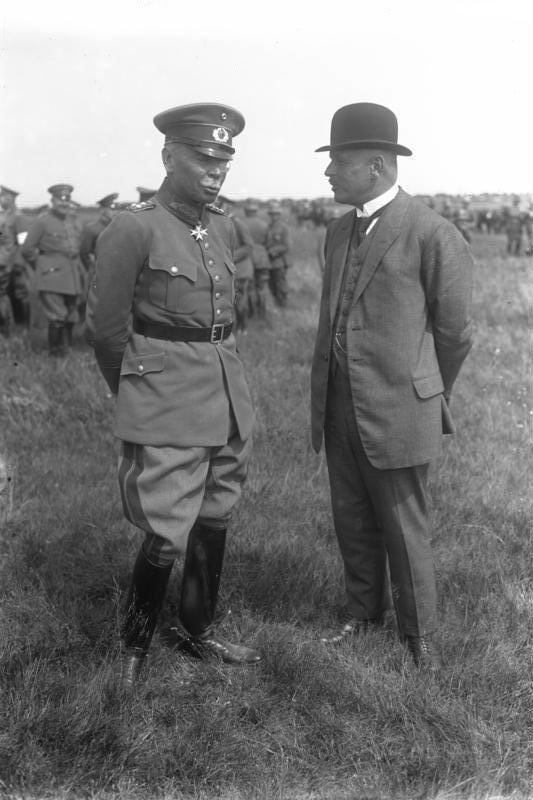
German commander-in-chief Hans von Seeckt (left) with Otto Geßler in 1930

Despite the manpower and technical limitations imposed upon the German Army by the Treaty of Versailles, several Reichswehr officers established a clandestine General Staff to study World War I and develop future strategies and tactics. One such Reichswehr officer, Hans von Seeckt, became Commander-in-Chief. Seeckt took to heart the lessons learned in the Great War and set about in rewriting the foundation of the German Army. Infantry still remained the heart and soul of any planned offensive, but the tank would become the spearhead of actions that could shatter enemy defenses through speed, force, and firepower. Tactics involved the splitting up of enemy formations and counteractions involving pincer movements to surround and ultimately decimate the enemy in whole. By 1926, German Army doctrine was all rewritten to fulfill this vision. Although at first the concept of the tank as a mobile weapon of war was met with apathy, German industry was silently encouraged to look into tank design, while quiet cooperation was undertaken with the Soviet Union. In the late 1920s and early 1930s, Germans closely co-operated with Russians in the development of armored vehicles, which were tested at Kama tank school, near Kazan in the USSR. There was also minor military cooperation with Sweden, including the extraction of technical data that proved invaluable to early German tank design.

As early as 1926 various German companies, including Rheinmetall and Daimler-Benz, produced a single prototype armed with a large 75-mm gun (codenamed Großtraktor, "large tractor", to veil the true purpose of the vehicle). Only two years later prototypes of the new Leichttraktor ("light tractor") were produced by German companies, armed with 37 mm (1.46 in) KwK L/45 guns. Development of the Neubaufahrzeug started in 1932 when Wa Prüf 6 established design specifications for a new 15 t (17 tons) tank to be known as the mittlere Traktor. It had many connections to the previous Großtraktor, utilizing many of the same components including the engine and transmission. Initially both Krupp and Rheinmetall were asked to submit proposals, but after the end of trials of the Großtraktor prototypes, during which Rheinmetall's vehicle proved superior to others, Krupp would only be awarded a contract for a turret design while Rheinmetall was to design both a chassis and turret. Rheinmetall's turret design had a rounded shape and was armed with a 3.7 cm (1.46 in) gun above the 7.5 cm (2.95 in) gun, while Krupp's turret was more rectangular and had the 3.7 cm gun mounted beside the 7.5 cm gun. Both turrets were also armed with a co-axial MG 34 machine gun, along with the two sub-turrets at the front and rear of the tank.

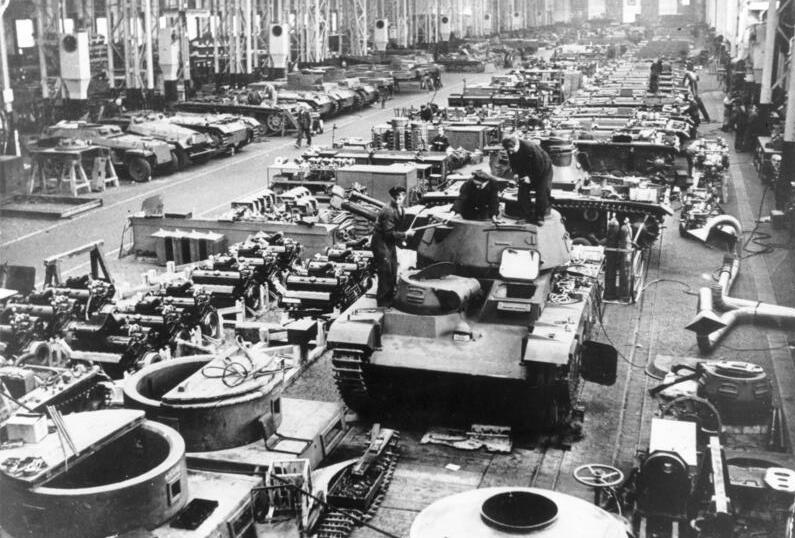
Neubaufahrzeug tanks shown while being repaired.

The Neubaufahrzeug was intended to fulfill the role of a medium tank in Germany's developing armored force, but it proved to have too many problems with its front drive and aircraft engine for this role. But even with all its faults, the Neubaufahrzeug provided insight into tank designing that was valuable to the next German medium tank project, the Begleitwagen ("accompanying vehicle") which would come to fruition as the Panzer IV tank for infantry support.

In 1934 Rheinmetall built two mild steel prototypes, one with their own turret design and one with Krupp's. Three more prototypes were built with proper armor and the Krupp turret design in 1936. The Großtraktor was later put into service for a brief period with the 1 Panzer Division; the Leichttraktor remained in testing until 1935.

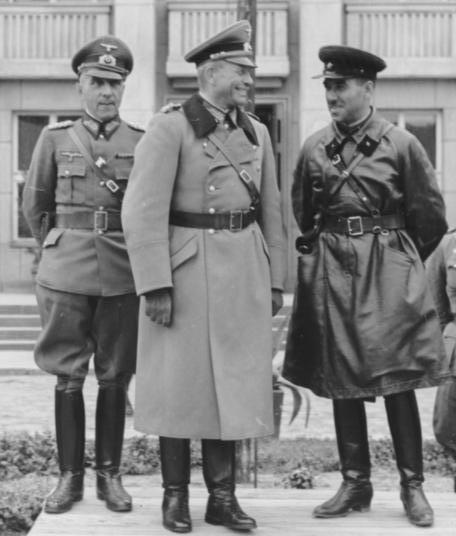
Gen. Heinz Guderian (center) with attache and Soviet officer at a joint German–Soviet parade in Brest.

In the late 1920s and early 1930s German tank theory was pioneered by two figures: General Oswald Lutz and his chief of staff, Lieutenant Colonel Heinz Guderian. Guderian became the more influential of the two and his ideas were widely publicized. Like his contemporary Sir Percy Hobart, Guderian initially envisioned an armored corps (panzerkorps) composed of several types of tanks. This included a slow infantry tank, armed with a small-caliber cannon and several machine guns. The infantry tank, according to Guderian, was to be heavily armored to defend against enemy anti-tank guns and artillery. He also envisioned a fast breakthrough tank, similar to the British cruiser tank, which was to be armored against enemy anti-tank weapons and have a large 75 mm (2.95 in) main gun. Lastly, Germany would need a heavy tank, armed with a massive 150 mm (5.91 in) cannon to defeat enemy fortifications, and even stronger armor. Such a tank would require a weight of 70 to 100 tonnes (77 to 110 tons) and was completely impractical given the manufacturing capabilities of the day.

In the early 1930s, the German Army called upon a few German firms to put together some funded prototype light and medium tanks. At this time, the Army did not have a formal plan of action in terms of what it realistically needed. Light tanks could be made available in large quantities for a relatively low price while medium tanks afforded firepower but came at a price. At any rate, the German industrial infrastructure - both the post-war limitations and the economical hit caused by the crash of 1929 - meant the development of light tanks to start with.

In 1931, Major-General Oswald Lutz was appointed the "Inspector of Motor Transport" in the German Army (Reichswehr) with Heinz Guderian as his chief of staff and they began building the German Armored Forces and a program of light training tank to train future personnel of panzer divisions. In 1932, specifications for light (5 long tons (5.1 t)) tank were made and issued to Rheinmetall, Krupp, Henschel, MAN and Daimler Benz.

Soon after rising to power in Germany, Adolf Hitler approved the creation of Germany's first panzer divisions. Simplifying his earlier proposal, Guderian suggested the design of a main combat vehicle which would be developed later into the Panzer III, and a breakthrough tank, the Panzer IV. No existing design appealed to Guderian. As a stopgap, the German Army ordered the preliminary vehicle to train German tank crews. This became the Panzer I.

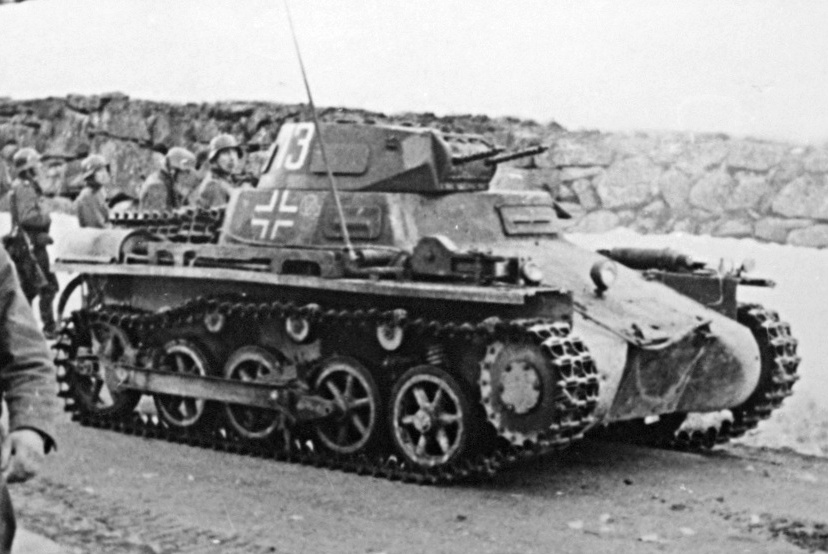
German Panzer I Ausf. A.

The Panzer I was intended not just to train Germany's panzer troops, but to prepare Germany's industry for the mass production of tanks in the near future: a difficult engineering feat for the time. In July 1932, Krupp revealed a prototype of the Landswerk Krupp A, or LKA, with a sloped front glacis plate and large central casemate, a design heavily influenced by the British Carden Loyd tankette. The tank was armed with two obsolescent 7.92 mm (0.312 in) MG 13 machine guns. Machine guns were known to be largely useless against even the lightest tank armor of the time, restricting the Panzer I to a training and anti-infantry role by design.

A mass-produced version of the LKA was designed by a collaborative team from Daimler-Benz, Henschel, Krupp, MAN, and Rheinmetall, exchanging the casemate for a rotating turret. This version was accepted into service after testing in 1934. Although these tanks were referred to as the La S and LKA well beyond the start of production, its official designation, assigned in 1938, was Panzerkampfwagen I Ausführung. A ('model A' or, more accurately, 'batch A'). The first fifteen tanks, produced between February and March 1934, did not include the rotating turret and were used for crew training. Following these, production was switched to the combat version of the tank.

Its debut in combat was during the Spanish Civil War (1936–1938). First 32 PzKpfw I along with single Kleiner Panzer Befehlswagen I arrived in October 1936. Only 106 tanks, (102 Ausf A, Ausf B and four Kleiner Panzer Befehlswagen I) saw service with the Condor Legion (Major Ritter von Thoma's Panzer Abteilung 88 also known as Abteilung Drohne) and General Franco's Nationalists. Pz.Abt.88 with its 3 companies was based at Cubas near Toledo, where German instructors trained future Spanish crews, while the unit was used for training duties and combat (e.g. assault on Madrid). Panzer I tanks proved to be outclassed by Soviet T-26 and BT-5 provided to Republican forces. However, the Panzer I was also a propaganda tool and as a show piece of the Third Reich and its military might in the years leading to beginning of World War II.

Lesson learned from Panzer I provided the German designers and manufacturers with valuable experience in designing and producing next generation of new panzers that were soon to come. Although the Panzer I was not a superb combat tank, it proved to be an excellent training tank and most of the Panzer crews were trained on Panzer I until the end of the war or operated it in combat as their first armoured vehicle.

The Germans also built the Sd.Kfz. 265 Panzerbefehlswagen, the German Army's first purpose-designed command tank, converted from the Panzer I Ausf B, and was the primary German command tank in service at the beginning of World War II.

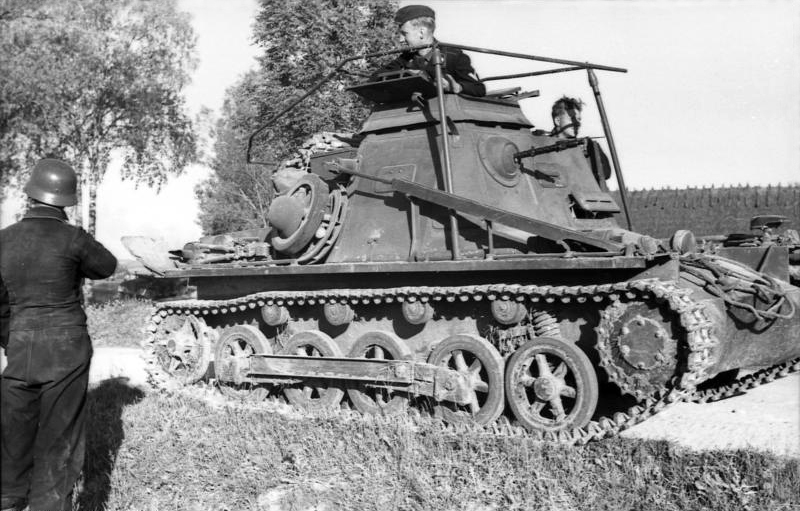
Panzerbefehlswagen command tank

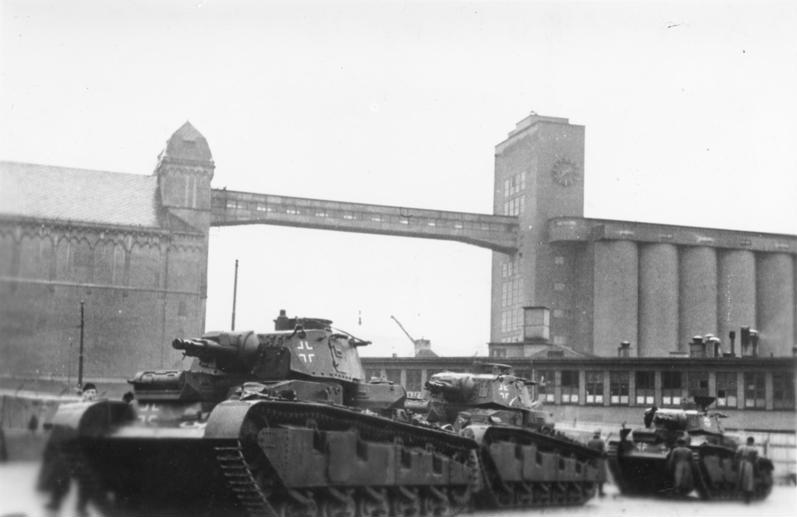
Three Neubaufahrzeuge arriving in Oslo Harbour, April 1940

In 1934, delays in the design and production of the Panzer III and Panzer IV tanks were becoming apparent. Designs for a stopgap tank were solicited from Krupp, MAN, Henschel, and Daimler-Benz. The final design was based on the Panzer I, but larger, and with a turret mounting a 20 mm (0.787 in) anti-tank gun. The Panzer II came about in a German Ordnance Department requirement enacted in 1934, this time proposing a 10 long tons (10 t) light tank development with 20 mm (0.787 in) cannon and 7.92 mm (0.312 in) machine gun armament. As was the case in developing the Panzer I, it became common practice for the new Germany, now wholly under Hitler, to skirt the rules of the Versailles Treaty and develop its systems of war under various peaceful disguises such as farm equipment. As such, this new light tank design fell under the designation of Landwirtschaftlicher Schlepper 100 (or "LaS 100") under the guise that it was a farm tractor. The Panzer II was around 50% heavier than the I and added a 20 mm (0.787 in) Solothurn cannon as main armament as well as increasing maximum armour to 30 mm (1.2 in). Production began in 1935, but it took another eighteen months for the first combat-ready tank to be delivered. It was also sent to Spain from 1937, and the Panzer II proved more capable against light infantry, but no better when faced with capable anti-tank guns or other tanks. Despite these weaknesses production continued until 1941, at the outbreak of war the German Army had 955 PzKpfw IIs and almost 4,000 were built in total.

The Panzer II was designed before the experience of the Spanish Civil War showed that shell-proof armor was required for tanks to survive on a modern battlefield as prior to that, armor was designed to stop machine gun fire and shell fragments. Production began in 1935, and by July 1937, the Panzer II was cleared and ready for production and by 1939, some 1,226 Panzer IIs were in circulation.

While the Panzer I proved the spearhead of these initial invasion assaults, the Panzer II formed the backbone of such early forays. The plan was to produce a better-armed and armored version of a light tank to shore up the limitations of the Panzer I as well as provide priceless training to tank crews. Underpowered, under-armored and lightly armed, the Panzer II experienced its hardships particularly against anti-tank weaponry at close ranges. Nevertheless, war was on the horizon so time was of the essence and the more lethal Panzer IIIs and Panzer IVs were being developed and soon be mass-produced for the coming battles.

=== World War II ===
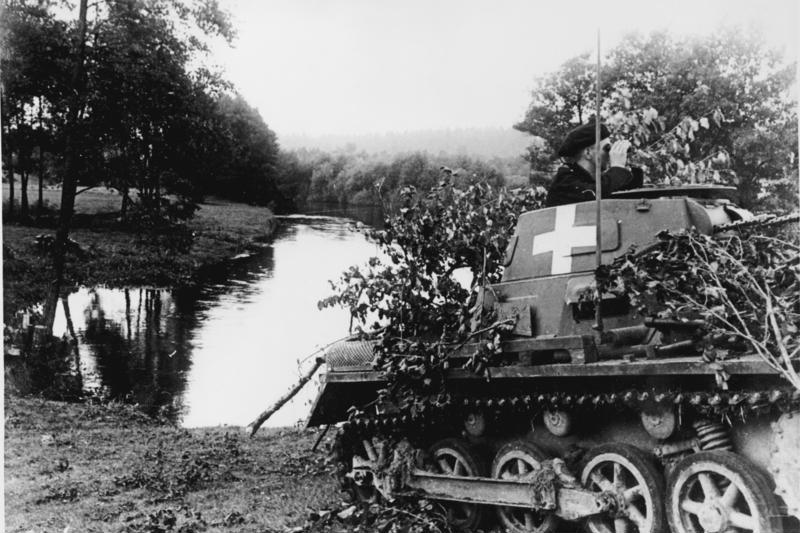
German Panzer I Ausf. A on the bank of the Brda River during the invasion of Poland.

The multi-turreted heavy tank Neubaufahrzeuge prototypes were used mainly for propaganda before the war and their role was extended with the German invasion of Norway, when a special Panzerabteilung was formed which took the three armored prototypes with them to Oslo. They saw some combat there, with one being blown up by German engineers when it got stuck in swamps near Åndalsnes. The other prototypes were eventually scrapped.

During the war, German tank design went through at least three generations, plus constant minor variations. The first generation included such unbattleworthy prewar vehicles as the Panzer I and II, which were similar to the Russian T-26 and T series and to the British cruiser tanks.

Panzer II (Sd.Kfz.121) was larger than Panzer I but also did not prove very effective in combat, although it was the main battle tank of the Panzertruppen until 1940/41. The main armament of 20mm cannon was adequate at the time of its introduction into service but soon proved to be an outclassed weapon.

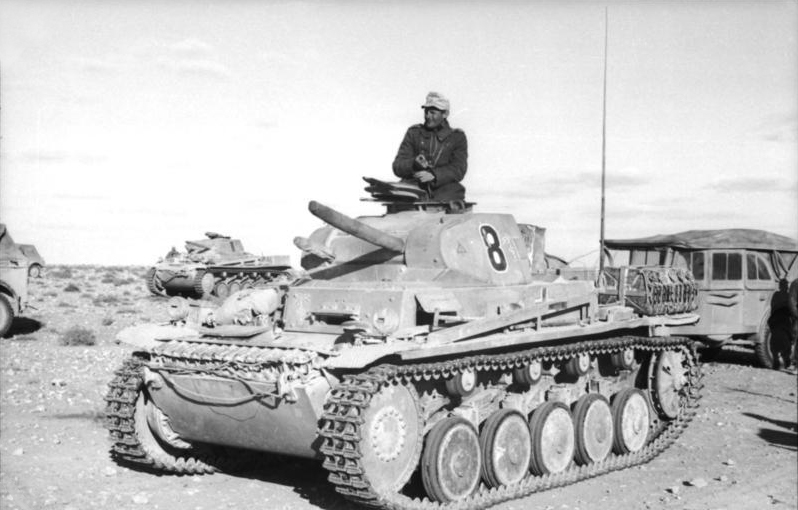
Panzer II of the 15th Panzer Division in North Africa

After the Fall of France, due to the poor cross-country performance, some older Panzer II tanks were taken out of service, and an improved and modified version replaced them armed with newer 20mm KwK 38 L/55 cannon. But from then on the Panzerkampfwagen II tanks was phased out and the remaining chassis were used as a base for Marder II (Sd.Kfz.131) tank destroyers and Wespe (Sd.Kfz.124) self-propelled howitzers.

==== Panzer III and Panzer IV ====
The second generation were the more heavily armored Panzer III and Panzer IV medium tanks. Ideally, the tank battalions of a panzer division were each to have three medium companies of Panzer IIIs and one heavy company of Panzer IVs. The Germans began to convert their tank battalions to a majority of Panzer III and IV medium tanks soon after the 1940 French campaign, thereby stealing a march on the Soviets and British, who still possessed obsolete equipment. The Panzer III was the first of German tanks to be equipped with an intercom system for internal (in-tank) communications, which proved to be very effective during combat. (Eventually, all of the German tanks were equipped with the device.) The Panzer III was Germany's first true medium battle tank, and formed the bulk of the Panzer Divisions' strength during the early years of WW2. (In addition, it was designed in a version specialized as a platoon commander's vehicle (Zugführerwagen), providing a significant upgrade in terms of survivability and firepower to earlier commanders' vehicles, like the Panzer I.) In 1940-41, attempts were made to standardize the production of Panzer III and Panzer IV, but soon after further development was halted.

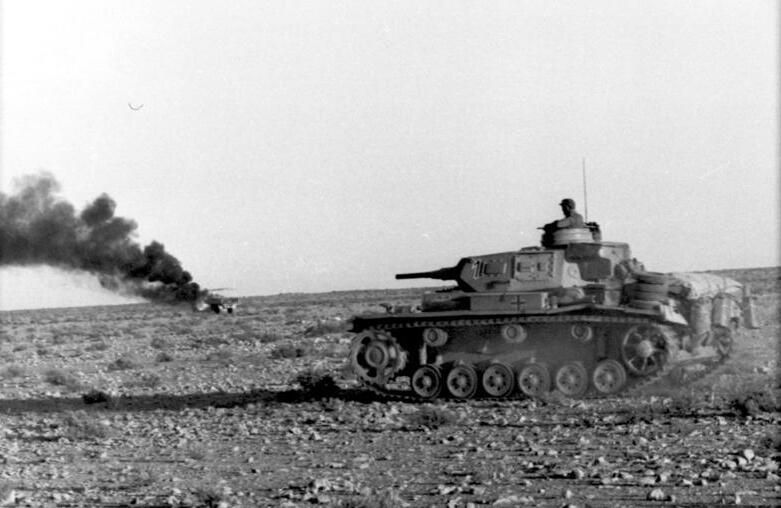
Panzer III advances past a burning vehicle in the desert, April 1941

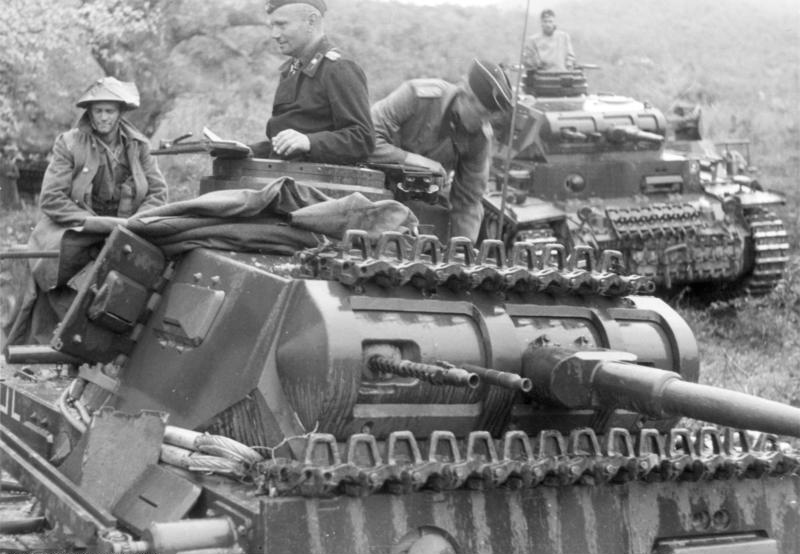
Panzerbefehlswagen (command tank) III Ausf E or F in Greece, fitted with a 37 mm gun and two coaxial machine guns (1941).

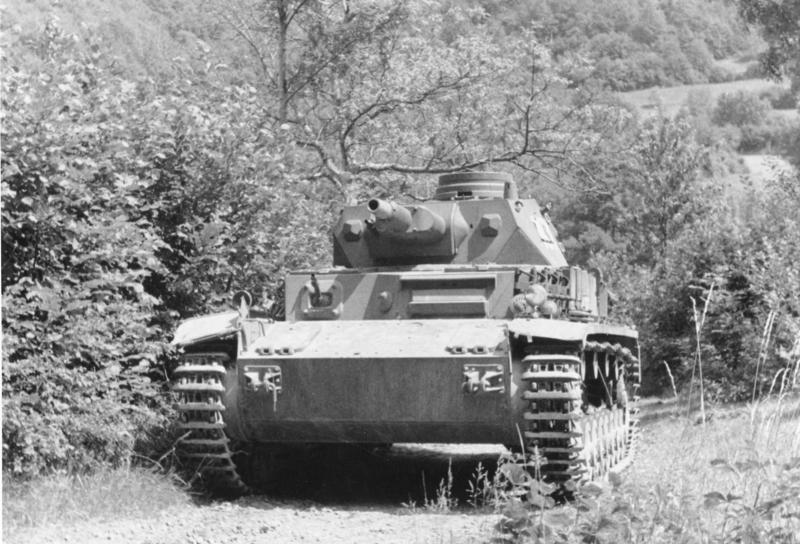
German Panzer IV medium tank.

==== Panzer V (Panther) ====
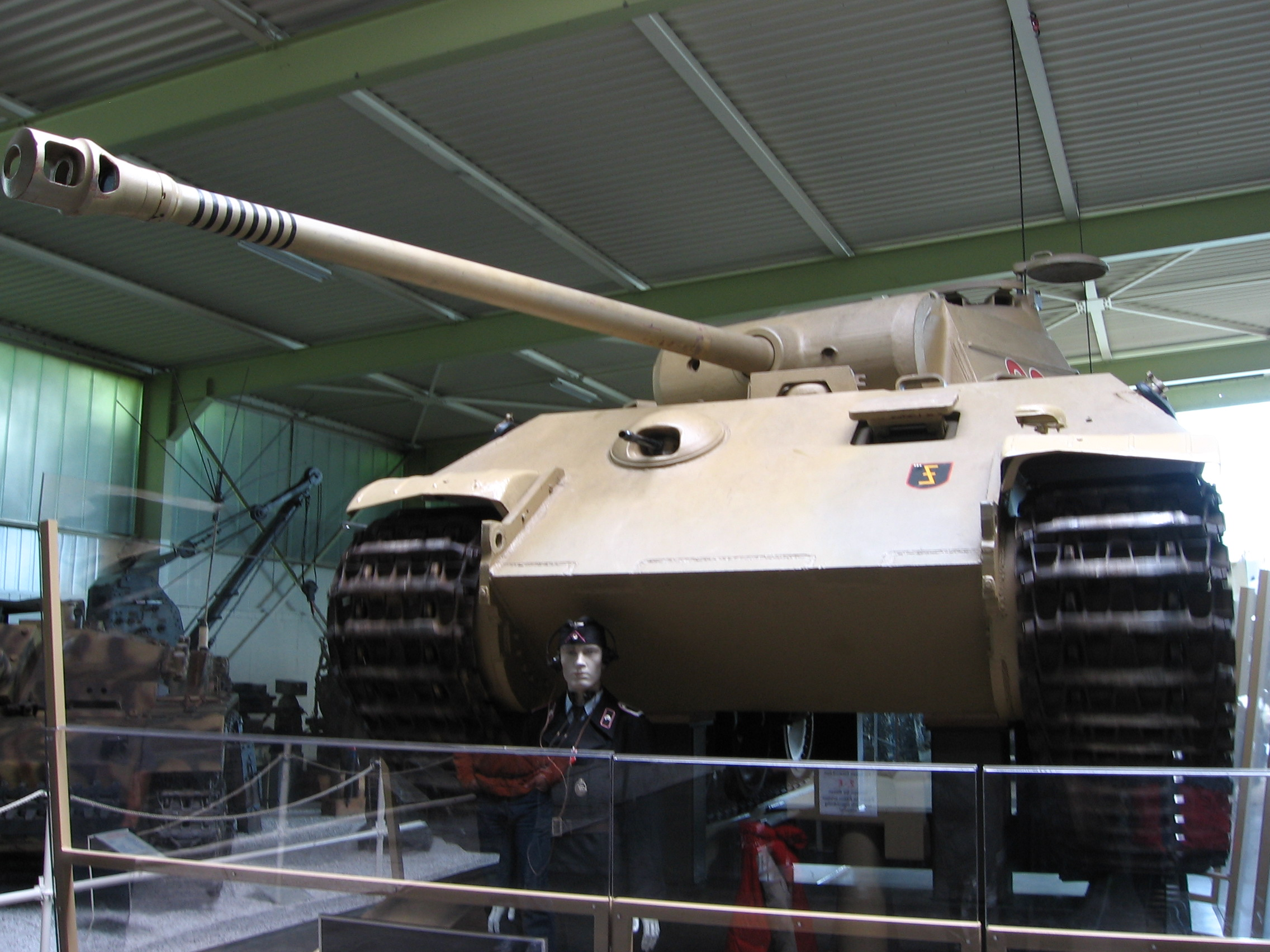
The 7.5 cm KwK 42 L/70 on a Panther Ausf. A tank.

The appearance of a few of the new generation T-34 and KV-1 tanks in the early phase of the German invasion of Russia in 1941 compelled the Germans to partake in a race for superior armor and firepower. The third generation included many different variants, but the most important designs were the Panzer V (Panther) and Panzer VI (Tiger) tanks.

First encountered on 23 June 1941, the T-34 outclassed the existing Panzer III and IV. At the insistence of General Guderian, a special Panzerkommision was dispatched to the Eastern Front to assess the T-34. Among the features of the Soviet tank considered most significant were the sloped armor. This enabled less armour to be used in order to achieve the same thickness of armour tank rounds needed to penetrate, and also gave much improved shot deflection and also increased the effective armor thickness against penetration, the wide track, which improved mobility over soft ground, and the 76.2 mm (3.00 in) gun, which had good armor penetration and fired an effective high-explosive (APHE/HE) round.

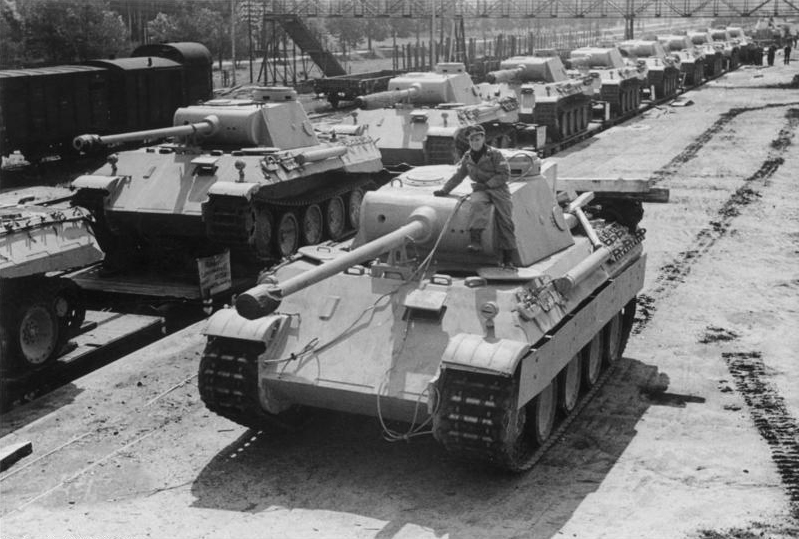
Panther Ausf. D tanks being transported by rail, 1943.

Daimler-Benz (DB) and MAN were given the task of designing a new 30- to 35-ton tank, designated VK30.02, which resembled the T-34 hull and turret form. Like the T-34, the DB design had a rear drive sprocket. Unlike the T-34, the DB design had a three-man turret crew: commander, gunner, and loader. But as the planned L/70 75 mm (2.95 in) gun was much longer and heavier than the T-34's, mounting it in the Daimler-Benz turret was difficult. The two designs were reviewed over a period from January through March 1942. Reichsminister Todt, and later, his replacement Albert Speer, both recommended the DB design to Hitler but a review by a special commission appointed by Hitler in May 1942 ended up selecting the MAN design. Hitler approved this decision after reviewing it overnight. One of the principal reasons given for this decision was that the MAN design used an existing turret designed by Rheinmetall-Borsig, while the DB design would have required a brand-new turret to be designed and produced, substantially delaying the commencement of production. A mild steel prototype was produced by September 1942 and, after testing at Kummersdorf, was officially accepted. It was put into immediate production. The start of production was delayed, however, mainly because there were too few specialized machine tools needed for the machining of the hull. Finished tanks were produced in December and suffered from reliability problems as a result of this haste. The demand for this tank was so high that the manufacturing was soon expanded beyond MAN to include Daimler-Benz, Maschinenfabrik Niedersachsen-Hannover (MNH) and Henschel & Sohn in Kassel.

The initial production target was 250 tanks per month at MAN. This was increased to 600 per month in January 1943. Despite determined efforts, this figure was never reached due to disruption by Allied bombing, manufacturing bottlenecks, and other difficulties. Production in 1943 averaged 148 per month. In 1944, it averaged 315 a month (3,777 having been built that year), peaking with 380 in July and ending around the end of March 1945, with at least 6,000 built in total. Front-line combat strength peaked on 1 September 1944 at 2,304 tanks, but that same month a record number of 692 tanks were reported lost.

==== Panzer VI (Tiger I) ====
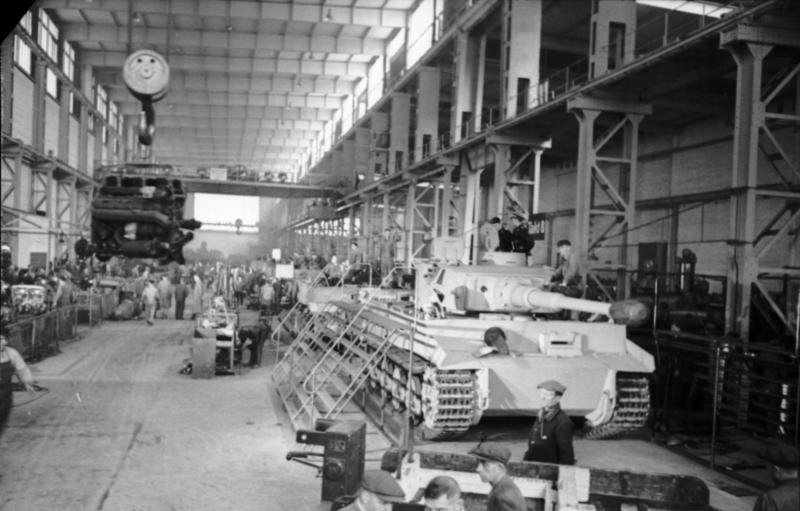
Tiger I production, 1944

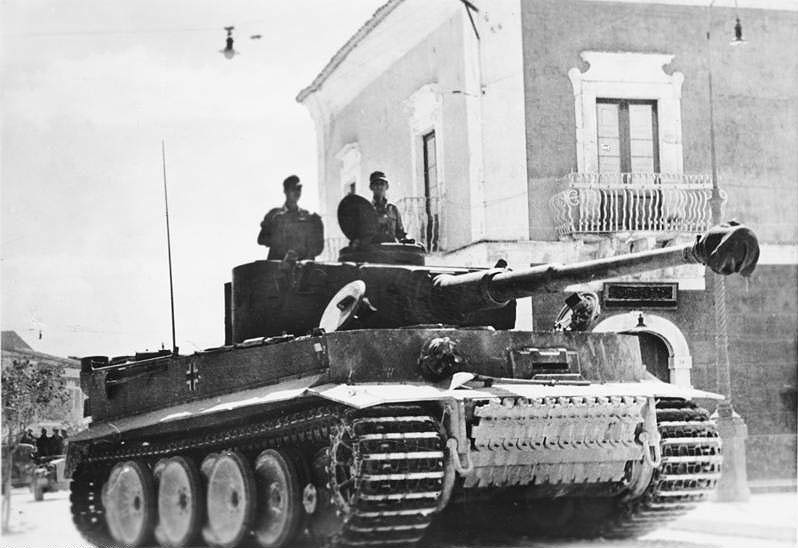
A WWII German Tiger I tank

The Tiger differed from earlier German tanks principally in its design philosophy. Its predecessors balanced mobility, armour, and firepower, and were sometimes outgunned by their opponents.

The Tiger I represented a new approach that emphasised firepower and armour. While heavy, this tank was not slower than the best of its opponents. However, with over 50 tonnes (55 tons) dead weight, suspensions, gearboxes, and other such items had clearly reached their design limits and breakdowns were frequent. Design studies for a new heavy tank had been started in 1937, without any production planning. Renewed impetus for the Tiger was provided by the quality of the Soviet T-34 encountered in 1941. Although the general design and layout were broadly similar to the previous medium tank, the Panzer IV, the Tiger weighed more than twice as much. This was due to its substantially thicker armour, the larger main gun, greater volume of fuel and ammunition storage, larger engine, and more solidly built transmission and suspension. The development of one of the most famous tanks of World War II was not finished till after the war had started and the first massive Tiger I heavy tank emerged in July 1942.

The first production Tigers were ready in August 1942 and from July 1942, 1,355 Tigers were manufactured till as late as August 1944. Tiger's production reached its highest point in April 1944, when 105 were produced. The main reason for the number produced was Tiger's difficult production. Out the entire number produced some 500 saw service with sSSPzAbts. On June 7 of 1943, Japanese ambassador in Germany, General Oshima was shown a Tiger from sPzAbt 502. Single Tiger was then sold to Japan in 1943, but was never delivered due to the war situation and was loaned by Japan to the German Army (sSSPzAbt 101).

Tiger I was armed with a 75mm gun, later upgraded to a powerful 88 mm (3.46 in) gun (originally developed from 88mm Flak 36 L/56 gun) that made it a very dangerous opponent for any Allied tank, and its thick (not shot-deflecting as sloped armour was not applied) armor made it virtually indestructible. Both the M4 Sherman with its 76mm gun and T-34/85 stood a chance against Tiger only at close range, as the only weak spot from the front was its view port. The rule applied by the British concerning the engagement of Tigers was that five Shermans were needed to destroy a single Tiger, but only one Sherman was to return from the engagement.

Tiger I heavy tank originally received the designation of Panzerkampfwagen VI H (8.8 cm) Ausf H1 - Sd.Kfz.182, but then in March 1943, was redesignated to Panzerkampfwagen Tiger (8.8 cm L/56) Ausf E - Sd.Kfz.181. It was commonly referred to as Tiger, Tiger I and PzKpfw VI. Officially there was only one type of Tiger tank produced, but during the duration of production improvements were carried on.

==== Panzer VI (Tiger II) ====
Planning for the Tiger II started as early as May 1941, a year before the Tiger I entered production. By the fall of 1942/January 1943, designers started work on a new heavy tank that would eventually replace the Tiger I. In January 1943, Hitler ordered the new Tiger to be armed with a long 88 mm (3.46 in) gun and have 150 mm (5.91 in) frontal armor and 80 mm (3.15 in) side armor. Front and side plates were to be sloped and interlocked, resulting in a design similar to the then-new PzKpfw V Panther (Sd.Kfz.171).It shared many components of the Panzer V Panther and Tiger II production began in January 1944 and ended in March 1945 with only 489 production vehicles.

Unfortunately for the Germans, their emphasis on protection and gun power compromised the mobility and reliability of their tanks. German production was also unable to compete with the volume produced by the Allied nations-in 1943, for example, Germany manufactured 11 000 tanks, as compared to 29,497 for the US, 7,476 for Britain, and an estimated 20,000 for the Soviet Union.

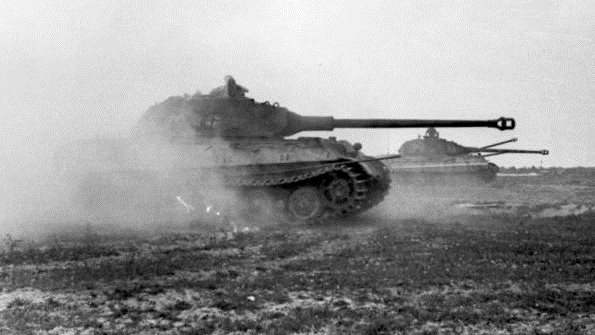
Tiger IIs (with the early production turret) on the move in northern France, June 1944

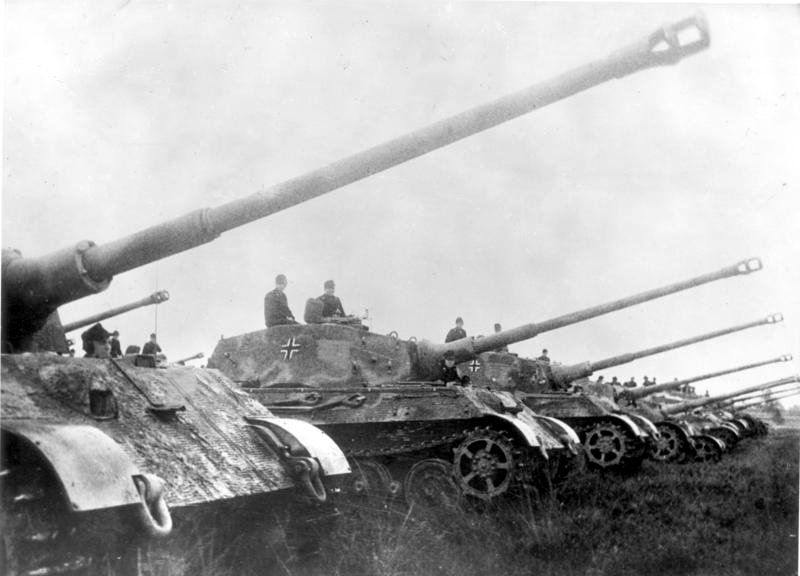
Tiger II's of 503rd heavy tank battalion posing in formation for the German newsreel

=== Cold War ===
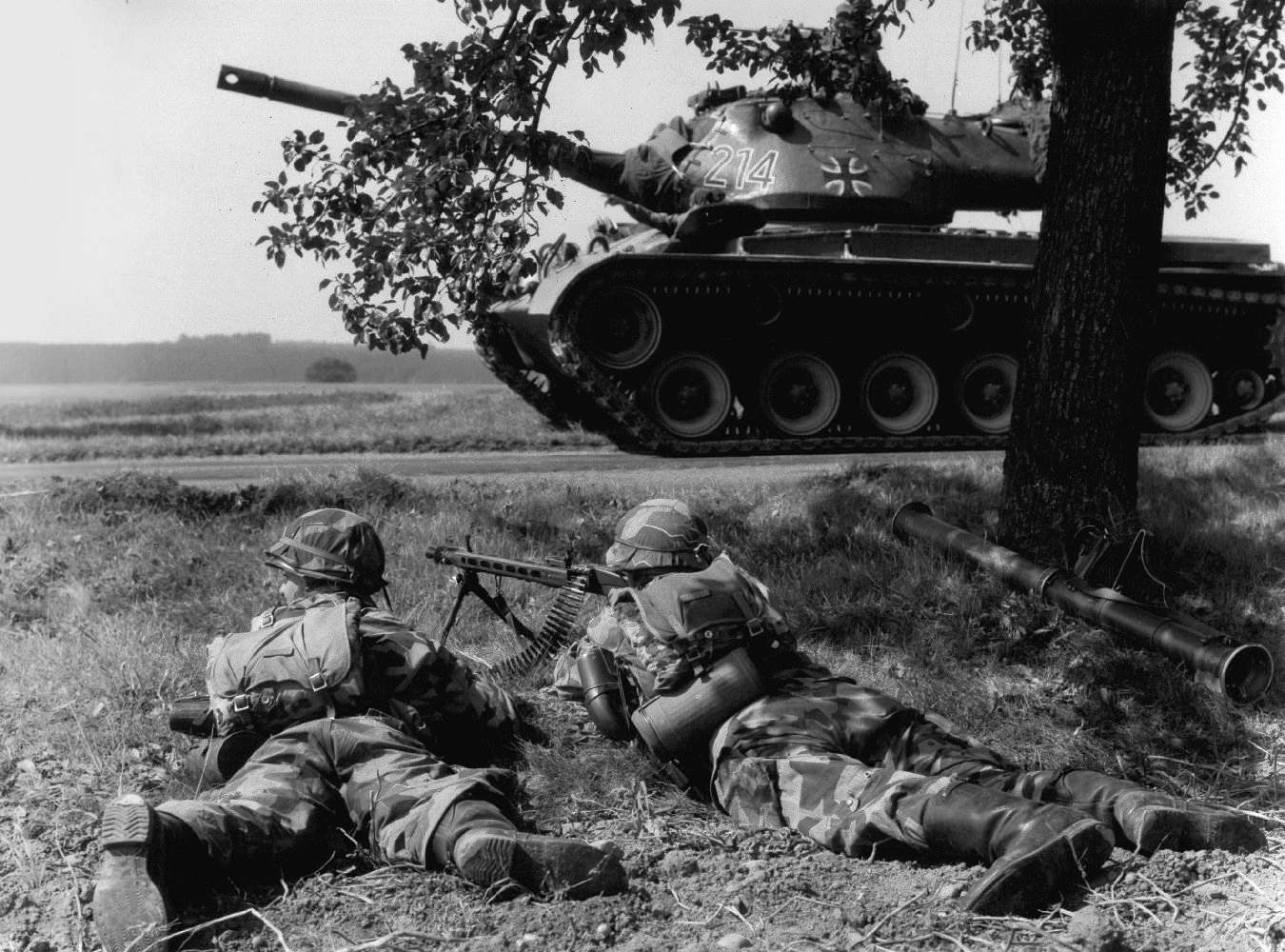
Kpz M47 - West German Bundeswehr first Tanks in 1956

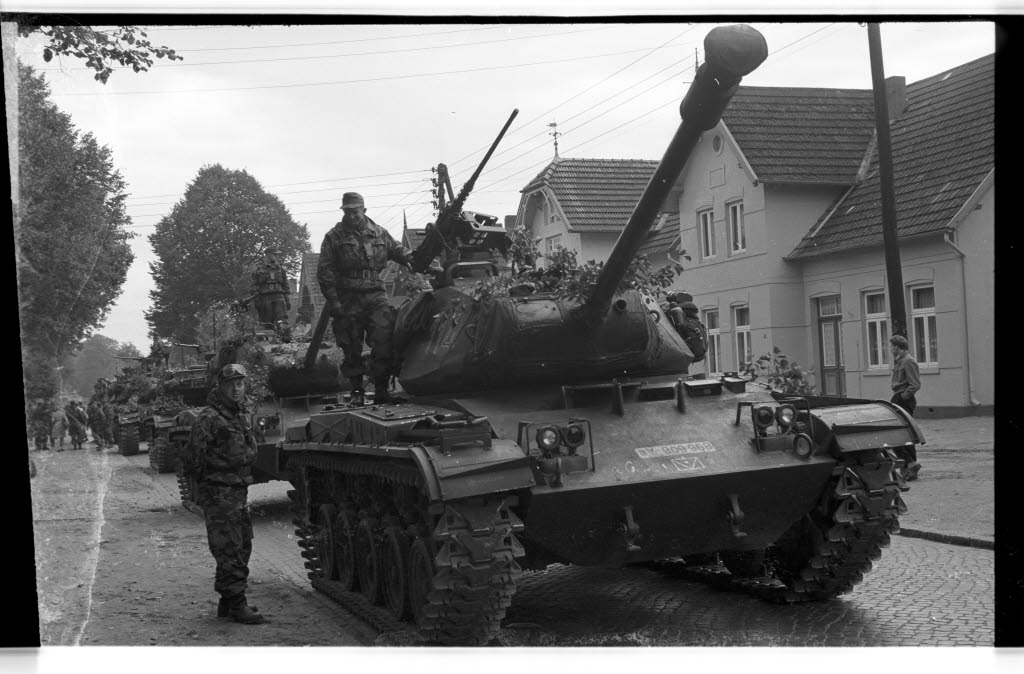
M41 tank of the 3rd Panzer Division's Kampfgruppe A 3 during the Manöver Südwind exercise in the Trittau and Neumünster area, 2 October 1957.

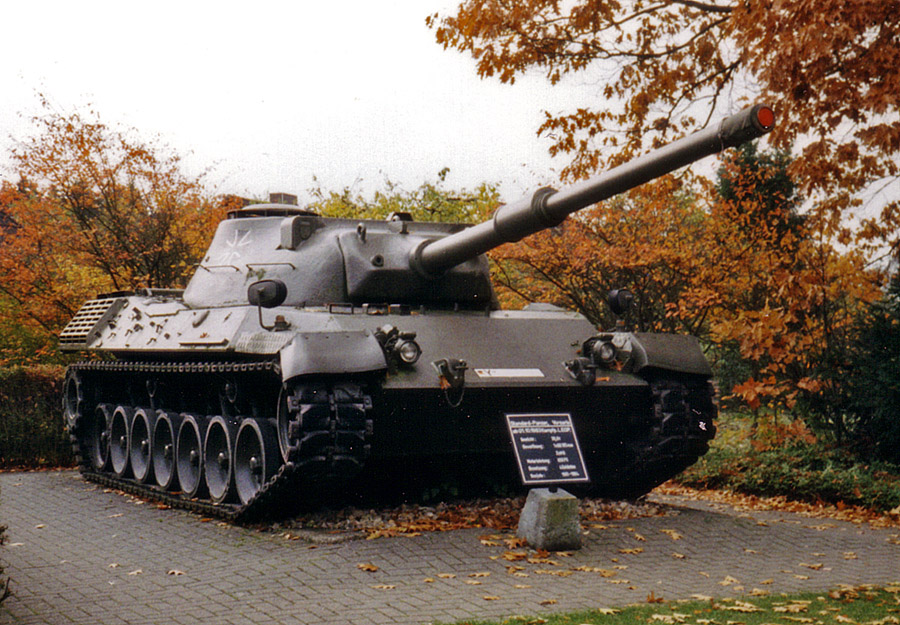
Leopard 1 Prototype II

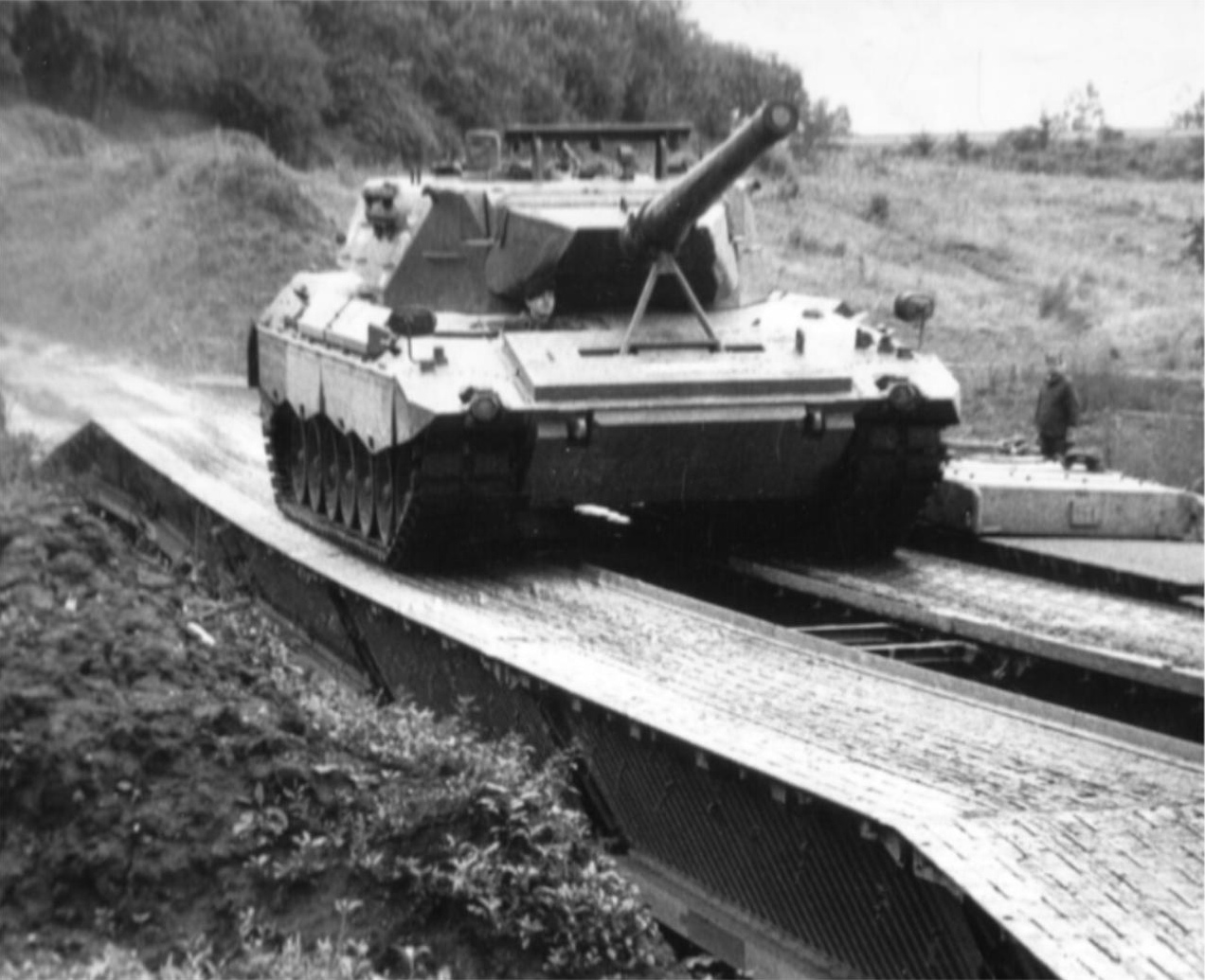
Leopard 2 Prototype

After the war, the Germans were given US equipment and the Panzerlehrbataillon armour forces established in April 1956. The Leopard tank project started in November 1956 in order to develop a modern German tank, the Standard-Panzer, to replace the Bundeswehr's United States-built M47 and M48 Patton tanks, which, though just delivered to West Germany's recently reconstituted army, were rapidly growing outdated.

Production was set up at Krauss-Maffei of Munich from early 1964 onward, with deliveries of the first batch between September, 1965 and July, 1966. The Leopard was soon being purchased from Germany by a number of NATO members and other allies.

After the first batch was delivered the next three batches were the Leopard 1A1 model, which included a new gun stabilization system from Cadillac-Gage, allowing the tank to fire effectively on the move. The 1A1 also added the now-famous "skirts" along the sides to protect the upper tracks, and a new thermal jacket on the gun barrel to control heating. A less important change was to use rectangular rubber blocks fastened to the treads with a single pin instead of the earlier two-pin "shaped" versions. The rubber blocks could be easily replaced with metal X-shaped crampons for movement on ice and snow in the winter.

Between 1974 and 1977 all of the machines in the first four batches were brought to the same Leopard 1A1A1 standard, and given additional turret armor developed by Blohm & Voss. The PZB 200 image intensification system was mounted in a large box on the upper right of the gun, creating the Leopard 1A1A2. A further upgrade with SEM80/90 all-digital radios created the Leopard 1A1A3.

In mid-1976 a prototype called Leopard 2AV (Austere Version) because it had a simplified fire control system, was assembled and shipped to the USA. It arrived in the US by the end of August 1976, and comparative tests between the Leopard 2 and the XM1 (the prototype name for the M1 Abrams) prototypes were held from 1 September at Aberdeen Proving Ground, lasting until December 1976. The US Army reported that the Leopard 2 and the XM1 were comparable in firepower and mobility, but the XM1 was superior in armour protection. (Today we know this was true as regards a hit by a hollow charge; but against KE-attack the Leopard 2 was almost twice as well protected as the original M1.)

In September 1977 1800 Leopard 2 were ordered, and the first batch of five was delivered on 25 October 1979. The Leopard 2 was made in many variations and became very popular for export in the nineties, when the shrinking German army offered many of its redundant Leopard 2s at a reduced price. It became successful enough in Europe that the manufacturer started calling it the Euro Leopard, but with further non-European orders, the name "Global-LEOPARD" is now used instead. However, France, Britain, and Italy all have their own MBTs currently (Leclerc, Challenger 2 and Ariete respectively).

=== Post Cold War ===
In 1984 Germany planned to develop a new MBT called Panzerkampfwagen 2000 (PzKW 2000). In 1988 the requirements for this tank were published, it was designed not as a conventional tank, it should incorporate advanced digital technologies and a new 140 mm (5.51 in) gun. For reaching a higher level of armour protection by having the same weight limit as the Leopard 2, the crew of the PzKW 2000 was reduced to only two men, who were located within the hull.

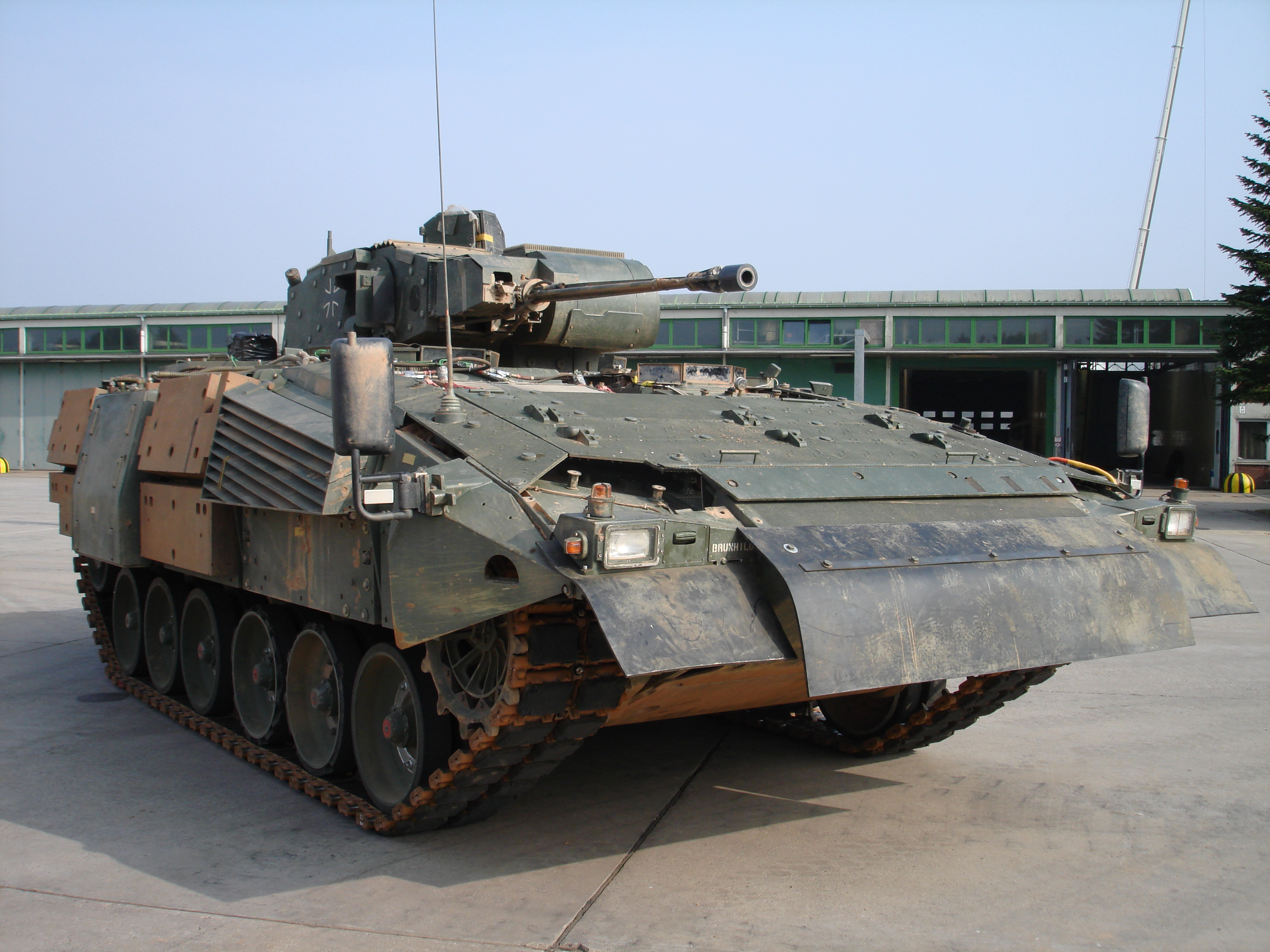
SPz Puma

For testing this new two men crew concept, two Leopard 1 tanks (called VT-2000) were modified. The PzKW 2000 was canceled due to the political changes during 1989 and 1990.

The next German main battle tank project was part of the Neue Gepanzerte Plattform (new armoured platform) programme, which was intended to develop three versions of a common platform: the first for a tank, the second for an infantry fighting vehicle and the last was designed to be used for support vehicles like SPAAGS. The tank would be armed with a 140 mm (5.51 in) gun, be manned by only two men and using modular composite armour. Therefore, the weight of this vehicle would be between 55 and 77 tonnes (61 and 85 tons). The project was canceled in 2001. No real prototypes were created, only one Experimentalträger Gesamtschutz (EGS), an armour test-bed, was built. The SPz Puma is based on some parts of the Neue Gepanzerte Plattform infantry fighting vehicle variant.

== Combat history ==
=== World War I ===
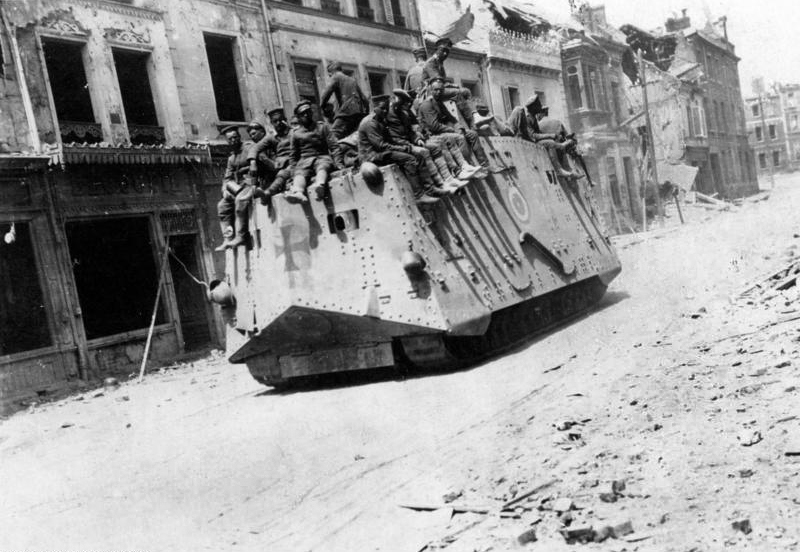
A7V tank at Roye on March 21, 1918.

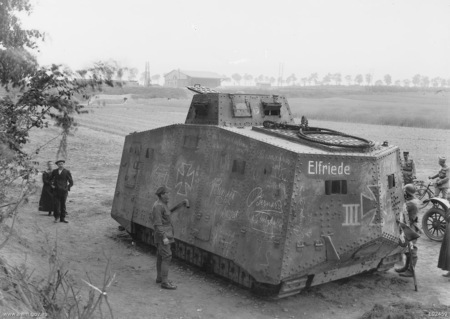
A captured German tank at Saleux, an A7V, with the name Elfriede, used for the first time at Villers-Bretonneux, in the attack of 24 April 1918. Taken May 26, 1918

The A7V was first used in combat on 21 March 1918. Five tanks under the command of Hauptmann Greiff were deployed north of the St. Quentin Canal. Three of the A7Vs suffered mechanical failures before they entered combat; the remaining pair helped stop a minor British breakthrough in the area, but otherwise saw little combat that day.

The first tank against tank combat in history took place on the 24 April 1918, when three A7Vs (including chassis number 561, known as "Nixe") taking part in an attack with infantry incidentally met three Mark IVs (two 'Female' with only machine guns and one 'Male' with two 6-pounder guns) near Villers-Bretonneux. During the battle, tanks on both sides were damaged. According to the lead tank commander, 2nd Lt Frank Mitchell, the Female Mk IVs fell back after being damaged by armour piercing bullets as they were unable to damage the A7Vs with their own machine guns. Mitchell then attacked the lead German tank, commanded by 2nd Lt Wilhelm Biltz, with the 6 pounders of his own tank and knocked it out. He hit it three times and killed five of the crew when they bailed out. His Mark IV fired at the enemy tanks and moved. He then went on to rout infantry with case shot. The two remaining A7Vs in turn withdrew. As Lt. Mitchell's tank withdrew from action, seven Whippet medium tanks also engaged the infantry. Four of these were knocked out in the battle, one of the A7Vs destroyed one Whippet and damaged three ones (three more Whippets were destroyed by German artillery). Lt. Mitchell's tank lost a track towards the end of the battle from a mortar shell and was abandoned. The damaged A7V was later recovered by German forces.

All 18 available A7Vs had been put into action that day with limited results; two toppled over into holes, some encountered engine or armament troubles. After a counterattack, three ended up in Allied hands. One was unusable and scrapped, one used for shell testing by the French, and the third captured by the Australians when the Infantry moved forward and dragged it back to their lines, the Germans still being in a position in sight of the tank and firing at them.

The tank name,"Mephisto" of this captured A7V is painted on the end facing of the box-shaped tank chassis serial number 506, as almost all German tanks in WW1 were given individual names.

The A7V was not considered a success and other designs were planned by Germany, however the end of the war meant none of the other tanks in development, or planned ones, would be finished (such as the Oberschlesien, K-Wagen, LK I or LK II).

The final use in World War I of A7Vs was in October 1918; a number were scrapped before the war ended in November.

The extremely limited production of twenty A7Vs made a very limited contribution, and most of the tanks (less than a hundred in total) that were fielded in action by Germany in World War I were captured British Mark IV tanks (Beutepanzer). The British tanks were repaired and overhauled in workshops established at Charleroi and rearmed with 57mm Maxim Nordenfelt guns in place of their 6-pounders. Some French tanks (including Renault FT light tanks) were also captured during the German offensive in November 1918, but no changes are known to have been done.

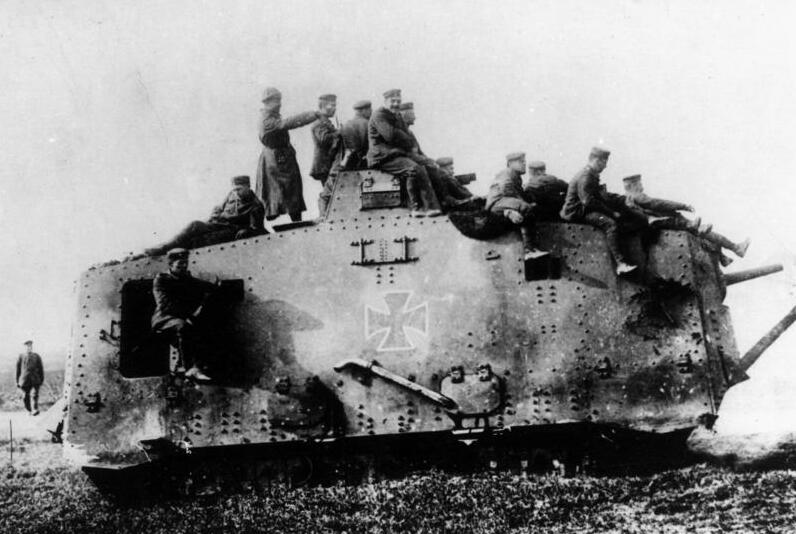
German A7V Siegfried, later scrapped by the Entente in 1919

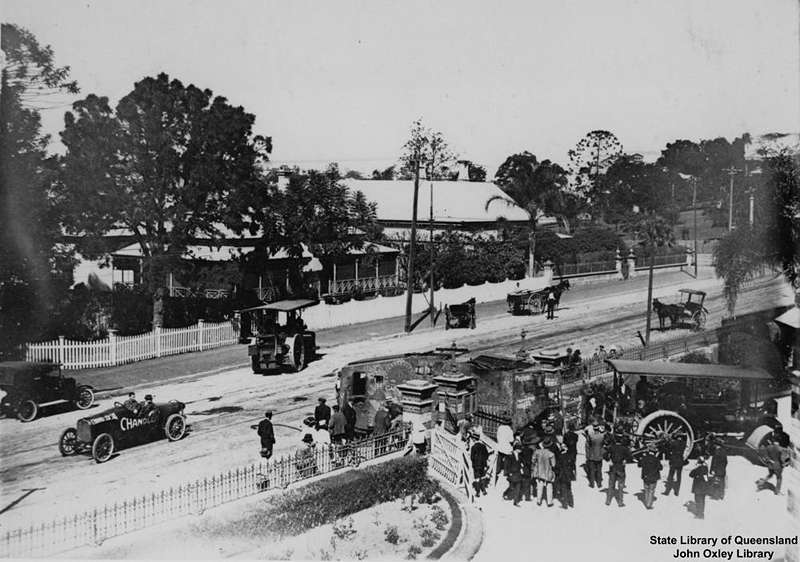
The A7V Mephisto, captured by the Australians being dragged into the Queensland Museum by two steamrollers in 1919

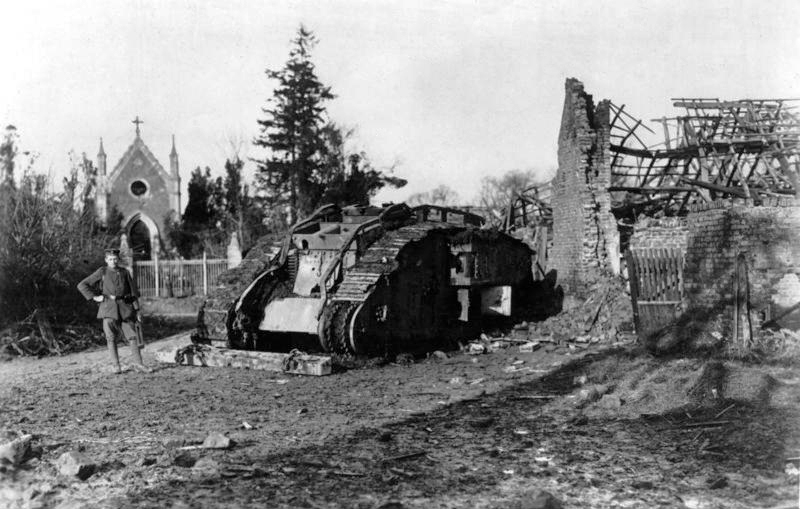
A German-captured British tank in 1917.Battle of Cambrai (1917).

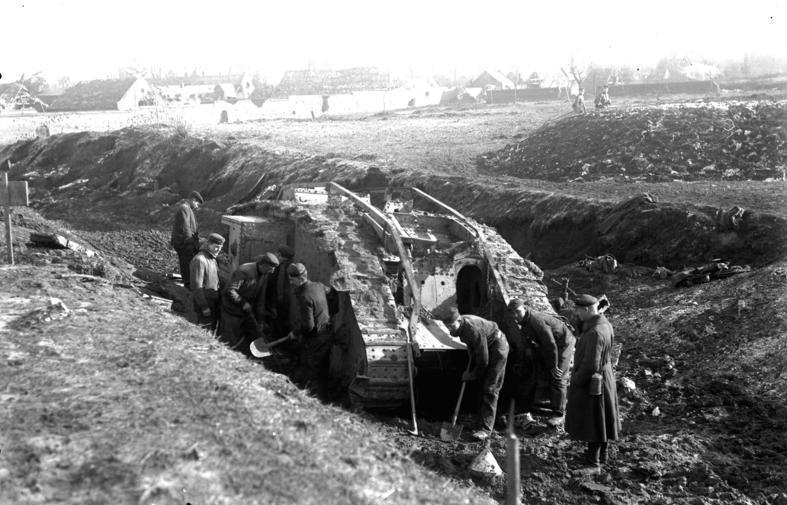
Germans recover a British Tank 1917.Battle of Cambrai (1917).

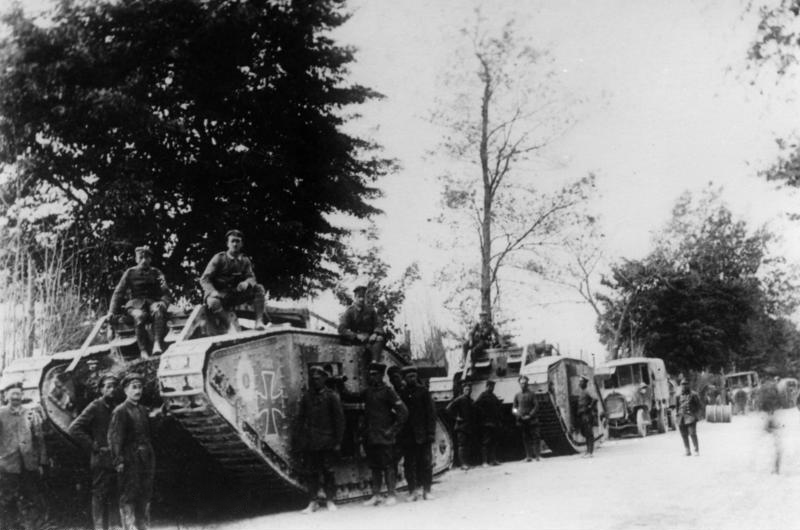
German forces using captured British Mark IVs during the Second Battle of the Marne.

=== Post World War I ===
After the war, many nations needed to have tanks, but only a few had the industrial resources to design and build them. During and after World War I, Britain and France were the intellectual leaders in tank design, with other countries generally following and adopting their designs. Germany was one of the countries which began to design and build their own tanks. The Treaty of Versailles had severely limited Germany's industrial output.

Among the German proponents of mechanization, Gen. Heinz Guderian was probably the most influential. Guderian's 1914 service with radiotelegraphs in support of cavalry units led him to insist on a radio in every armored vehicle. By 1929, when many British students of armor were tending towards a pure armor formation, Guderian had become convinced that it was useless to develop just tanks, or even to mechanize parts of the traditional arms. What was needed was an entirely new mechanized formation of all arms that would maximize the effects of the tank.

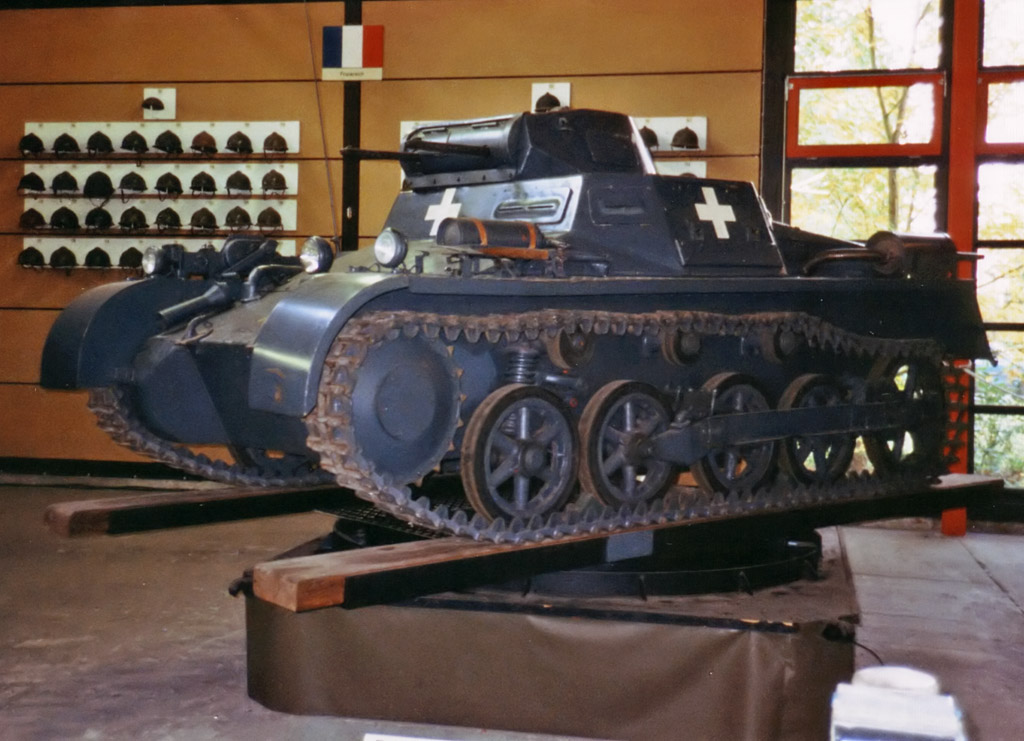
Panzer I, Mark A on a turntable

The German tanks were not up to the standards of Guderian's concept. The Panzer I was really a machine gun-armed tankette, derived from the British Carden-Loyd personnel carrier. The Panzer II did have a 20 mm (0.787 in) cannon, but little armor protection. Germany, constrained by the terms of the Treaty of Versailles, was not allowed to produce tanks of any kind and only a few armoured cars. In 1926 an unofficial program of tank construction was initiated by Von Seeckt, the commander of the Reichswehr. Built by Rheinmetall-Borsig the first grosstraktor was similar to the existing British Mk II medium tank, 20 long tons (20 t) with a 75 mm (2.95 in) gun. This and other designs were tested with Soviet cooperation at a tank school in western Russia. In Germany proper dummy tanks were used in training, apparently at the instigation of then Major, Heinz Guderian, a staff tactical instructor. Guderian had read Fuller, Liddell-Hart, and other tank warfare theorists and he had the support of his commanders to develop his theories into reality. In 1931 the German General Staff accepted a plan for two types of tank, a medium tank with a 75 mm (2.95 in) gun and a lighter vehicle with a 37 mm (1.46 in) gun. While design and then construction work was carried out the German army used a variety of light tanks based on the British Carden-Lloyd chassis. The early tanks were code-named Landwirtschaftlicher Schlepper (La S), a designation that lasted until 1938. The first of these light tanks ran in early 1934, a 5 long tons (5.1 t) Krupp design it was dubbed the LKA1. The new government approved an initial order for 150 in 1934 as the 1A La S Krupp, around 1500 of these light tanks were built.

Later German tanks received a new designation, Panzerkampfwagen (PzKpfw or PzKw). The first machine to use this was the two-man PzKpfw I Ausf A, a 5.4 long tons (5.5 t) machine with a 3.5-litre 60 hp (45 kW) petrol engine. It had 13 millimetres (0.51 in) of armour and was armed with twin 7.92 mm (0.312 in) machine guns. The Panzer I light tank design began in 1932 and mass production in 1934. The more common Ausf B was a trifle larger to accommodate a 100 hp (75 kW) Maybach engine. Both models were sent to the Spanish Civil War for testing, along with other new German weapons. From Spain it quickly became clear that the next generation of tanks would need better armour, greater range and much heavier weapons. Experiences with the Panzer I during the Spanish Civil War helped shape the German armored corps' invasion of Poland in 1939 and France in 1940. The Panzer I's performance in combat was limited by its thin armor and light armament of two general purpose machine guns. As a design intended for training, the Panzer I was not as capable as other light tanks of the era, such as the T-26.

The PzKpfw II was around 50% heavier than the I and added a 20 mm (0.787 in) Solothurn cannon as main armament as well as increasing maximum armour to 30 millimetres (1.2 in). In 1934, delays in the design and production of the Panzer III and Panzer IV tanks were becoming apparent. Designs for a stopgap tank were solicited from Krupp, MAN, Henschel, and Daimler-Benz. The final design was based on the Panzer I, but larger, and with the turret mounting the 20 mm (0.787 in) anti-tank gun making it a more formidable tank than the Panzer I. Production began in 1935, but it took another eighteen months for the first combat-ready tank to be delivered. It was also sent to Spain from 1937, and the PzKpfw II proved more capable against light infantry, but no better when faced with capable anti-tank guns or other tanks. Despite these weaknesses production continued until 1941, at the outbreak of war the German Army had 955 PzKpfw IIs and almost 4000 were built in total.

A major boost to German armour came with the acquisition of Czechoslovakia in 1938, giving the entire Czech arms industry to Germany. The Czechs already had two main tank designs, the Škoda LT vz. 35 and the Českomoravská Kolben-Daněk (ČKD) TNHP (LT vz. 38). The Škoda was a 10 long tons (10 t) machine with a 37 mm (1.46 in) main gun and excellent cross-country capabilities; the ČKD was 8.5 long tons (8.6 t) and also fitted with a 37 mm (1.46 in) gun - due to extensive tests it was an extremely reliable machine with a top-quality chassis. Both were taken into the German panzer forces, as the PzKpfw 35(t) and the PzKpfw 38(t), and further production was ordered. ČKD was renamed Böhmisch-Mährische Maschinenfabrik AG (BMM) in 1940 and continued production until 1942, providing the Wehrmacht with 1,168 PzKpfw 38(t)'s. In 1940 Czech tanks made up around a quarter of the entire German panzer force.

Lighter tanks formed almost the entirety of the German forces, but the heavier tanks were at least in prototype. In 1934 several heavy prototypes were constructed, based around either 75 mm (2.95 in) or 105 mm (4.1 in) main guns. Designated Neubaufahrzeug (NbFz) and similar to contemporary Russian and British designs six were built by Rheinmetall and Krupp. Useful for propaganda purposes these tanks did not enter production, their later designations of PzKpfw V and VI were transferred to the production Panther and Tiger types. With the knowledge of the NbFz and the experiences of the lighter tanks in Spain, German designers began to create their own designs.

The PzKpfw III was the first German tank capable of firing armour-piercing rounds, although the 37 mm (1.46 in) gun was considered underpowered but was used in the interests of standardisation with the infantry. The official German designation was Panzerkampfwagen III (abbreviated PzKpfw III) translating as "armoured battle vehicle", and it was intended to fight other armoured fighting vehicles and serve alongside the infantry-supporting Panzer IV. Limited by existing bridges to a maximum weight of 24 long tons (24 t), development contracts for the Zugkraftwagen were issued late in 1936. Development work continued until 1938 when the Ausf D went into limited production, a 19 long tons (19 t) machine it was powered by a 12-litre 320 hp (240 kW) engine, with a top speed of 25 mph (40 km/h) and fitted with 30 mm (1.18 in) armour all round. By the outbreak of war around fifty had been completed and some saw service in Poland. Full-scale production did not begin until October 1939 as the Ausf E, around 350 PzKpfw IIIs in D and E variants were ready by the invasion of France.

=== Spanish Civil War ===
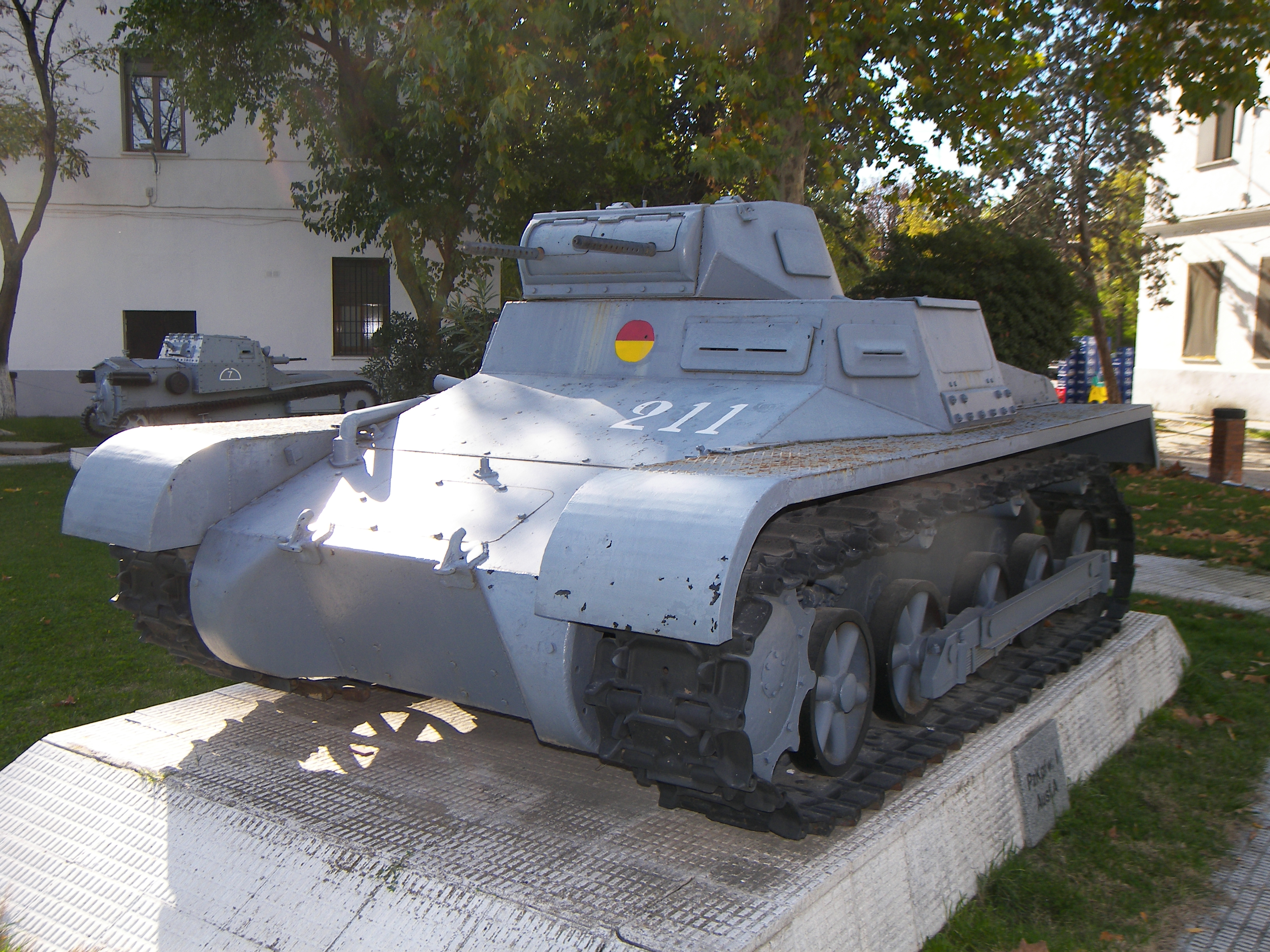
Panzer I Ausf A at El Goloso Museum of Armored Vehicles, in Spain

On 18 July 1936 the Spanish Civil War broke out. After the chaos of the initial uprising, two sides coalesced and began to consolidate their position—the Popular front (the Republicans) and the Spanish Nationalist front. In an early example of a proxy war, both sides quickly received support from other countries, most notably the Soviet Union and Germany, who wanted to test their tactics and equipment. Fifty Soviet T-26 tanks arrived on 15 October; Germany immediately responded by sending forty-one Panzer I's to Spain a few days later - 38 Ausf A and three Panzerbefehlswagen command vehicles. This was followed by four more shipments of Panzer I Ausf. B's, with a total of 122 vehicles.

The first shipment of Panzer I's was brought under the command of Lieutenant Colonel Wilhelm Ritter von Thoma in Gruppe Thoma (also referred to as Panzergruppe Drohne). Gruppe Thoma formed part of Gruppe Imker, the ground formations of the German Condor Legion, who fought on the side of Franco's Nationalists. Between July and October, a rapid Nationalist advance from Seville to Toledo placed them in position to take the Spanish capital, Madrid. The Nationalist advance and the fall of the town of Illescas to Nationalist armies on 18 October 1936 caused the government of the Popular Front's Second Republic to flee to Barcelona and Valencia. In an attempt to gain crucial time for Madrid's defence, Soviet tanks were deployed south of the city under the command of Colonel Krivoshein before the end of October. At this time, several T-26 tanks under the command of Captain Paul Arman were thrown into a Republican counterattack directed towards the town of Torrejon de Velasco in an attempt to cut off the Nationalist advance north. This was the first tank battle in the Spanish Civil War. Despite initial success, poor communication between the Soviet Republican armor and Spanish Republican infantry caused the isolation of Captain Arman's force and the subsequent destruction of a number of tanks. This battle also marked the first use of the molotov cocktail against tanks. Ritter von Thoma's Panzer Is fought for the Nationalists only days later on 30 October and immediately experienced problems. As the Nationalist armor advanced, it was engaged by the Commune de Paris battalion, equipped with Soviet BA-10 armored cars. The 45 mm (1.77 in) gun in the BA-10 was more than sufficient to knock out the thinly armored Panzer I at ranges of over 500 metres (1,600 ft).

Although the Panzer I would participate in almost every major Nationalist offensive of the war, the Nationalist army began to deploy more and more captured T-26 tanks to offset their disadvantage in protection and firepower. At one point, von Thoma offered up to 500 pesetas for each T-26 captured. Although the Panzer I was initially able to knock out the T-26 at close range 150 metres (490 ft) or less—using an armor-piercing 7.92 mm (0.312 in) bullet, the Republican tanks began to engage at ranges where they were immune to the machine guns of the Panzer I.

The Panzer I was upgraded in order to increase its lethality. On 8 August 1937 Major General García Pallasar received a note from Generalísimo Francisco Franco which expressed the need for a Panzer I (or negrillo, as their Spanish crews called them) with a 20 mm (0.787 in) gun. Ultimately the weapon chosen was the Breda Model 1935, due to the simplicity of the design over competitors such as the German 2 cm FlaK 30. Furthermore, the 20 mm (0.787 in) Breda was capable of perforating 40 millimetres (1.6 in) of armor at 250 metres (820 ft), which was more than sufficient to penetrate the frontal armor of the T-26. Forty Italian CV.35 light tanks had been ordered with the Breda in place of their original armament, this order was canceled when it was thought adaptation of the same gun to the Panzer I would yield better results. Prototypes were ready by September 1937 and an order was placed after successful results. The mounting of the Breda in the Panzer I required the original turret to be opened at the top and then extended by a vertical supplement. Four of these tanks were finished at the Armament Factory of Seville, but further production was canceled as it was decided enough Republican T-26 tanks had been captured to fulfill the Nationalist leadership's request for more lethal tanks. The Breda modification was not particularly liked by German crews, as the unprotected gap in the turret, designed to allow the tank's commander to aim, was found to be a dangerous weak point.

In late 1938 another Panzer I was sent to the Armament Factory of Seville to mount a 45 mm (1.77 in) gun, captured from a Soviet tank (a T-26 or BT-5). A second was sent sometime later to exchange the original armament for a 37 mm (1.46 in) Maklen anti-tank gun, which had been deployed to Asturias in late 1936 on the Soviet ship A. Andreiev. It remains unknown to what extent these trials and adaptations were completed, although it is safe to assume neither adaptation was successful beyond the drawing board.

Panzer I deliveries to Spain (1936–1939)
Date	Number of vehicles	Additional information
October 1936	41	Formed part of the Condor Legion
December 1936	21	
August 1937	30	
End of 1937	10	
January 1939	30	
Total:	132	

=== Second World War ===
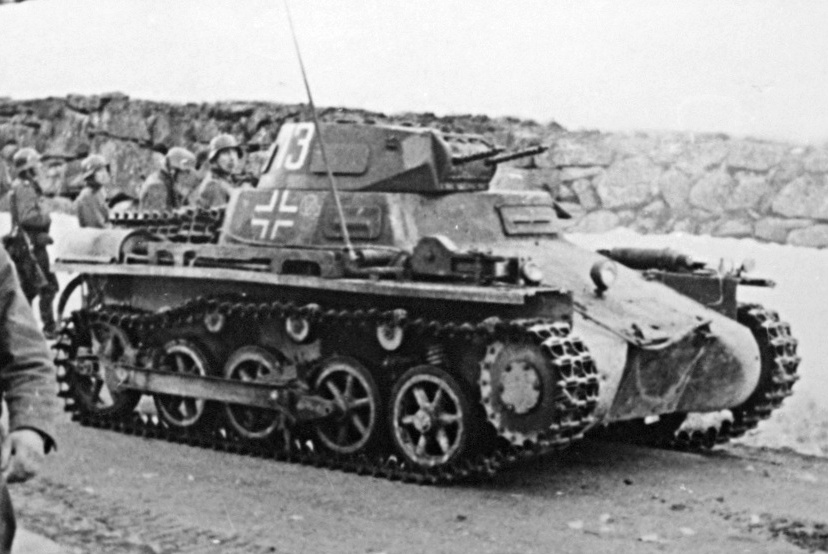
Panzer I Ausf. A in combat during the German invasion of Norway.

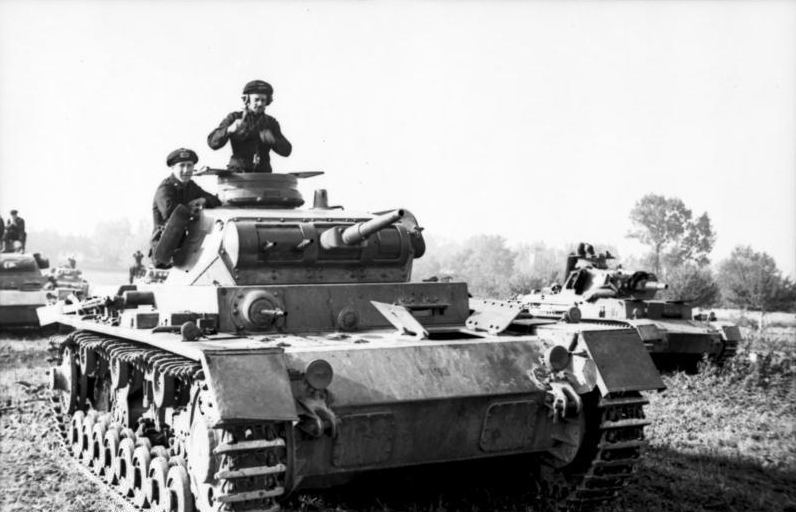
Panzer III Ausf. D in Poland, 1939

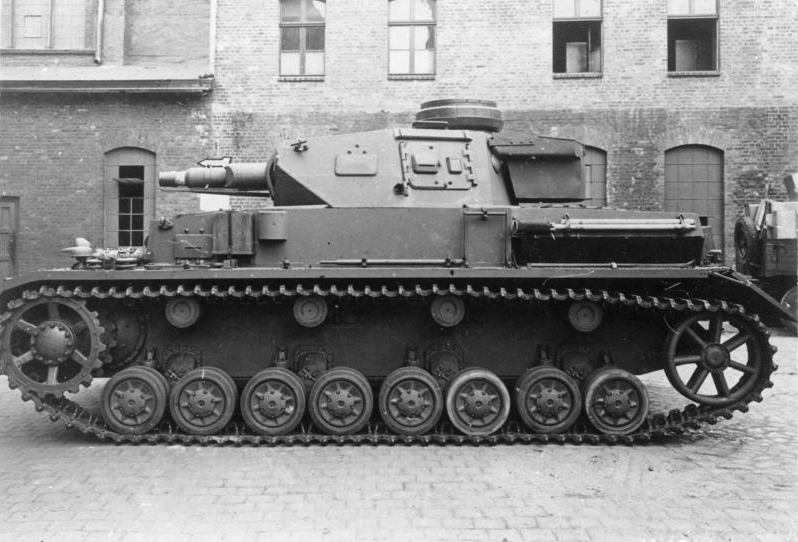
German Panzer IV with 7.5cm KwK 37 L/24

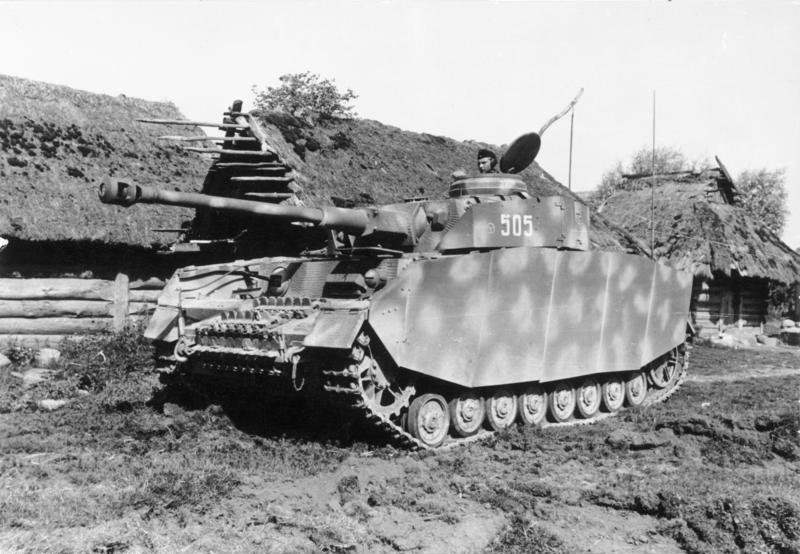
7.5 cm KwK 40 L/48 on a Panzer IV

During the initial campaigns of the Second World War, Germany's light tanks, including the Panzer I, formed the bulk of its armored strength. In March 1938, the German Army annexed Austria, experiencing a mechanical breakdown rate of up to thirty percent. However, the experience revealed to Guderian several faults within the German Panzerkorps and he subsequently improved logistical support. Germany also had some other tanks that were to prove useful in the early part of the war. In October 1938, Germany annexed the Sudetenland in Czechoslovakia, and parts of the remainder of the country in March 1939 to be limited to Bohemia and Moravia. The conquest allowed several Czech tank designs, such as the Panzer 38(t), and their subsequent variants and production, to be incorporated into the German Army's strength. It also prepared German forces for the invasion of Poland.

On 1 September 1939, Germany invaded Poland using seventy-two divisions (including 16 reserve infantry divisions in OKH reserves), including seven panzer divisions (1., 2., 3., 4., 5., 10., "Kempf") and four light divisions (1., 2., 3., 4.). Three days later, France and Britain declared war on Germany. The seven panzer and four light divisions were arrayed in five armies, forming two army groups. The battalion strength of the 1 Panzer Division included no less than fourteen Panzer I's, while the other six divisions included thirty-four. A total of about 2,700 tanks were available for the invasion of Poland, but only 310 of the heavier Panzer III and IV tanks were available. The Germans held some 1,400 of Panzer Is at the ready during the invasion. Furthermore, 350 tanks were of Czech design—the rest were either Panzer I's or Panzer IIs. The invasion was swift and the last Polish pockets of resistance surrendered on 6 October.

The entire campaign lasted five weeks with Poland attacked from the East by the USSR from 17 September and the success of Germany's tanks in the campaign was summed up in response to Hitler on 5 September: when asked if it had been the dive bombers who destroyed a Polish artillery regiment, Guderian replied, "No, our panzers!"

The Poles suffered almost 190,000 casualties (including around 66,300 killed) in the campaign, the Germans around 55,000 (including around 35,000 wounded). However, some 832 tanks (including 320 PzI, 259 PzII, 40 Pz III, 76 PzIV, 77 Pz35(t), 13 PzBef III, 7 PzBef 38(t), 34 other PzBef and some Pz38(t)) were lost during the campaign, approximately 341 of which were never to return to service. This represented about a third of Germany's armor deployed for the Polish campaign. During the campaign no less than a half of Germany's tanks were unavailable due to maintenance issues or enemy action, and of all tanks, the Panzer I proved the most vulnerable to Polish anti-tank weapons.

It was found that handling of armored forces during the campaign left much to be desired. During the beginning of Guderian's attack in northern Poland, his corps was held back to coordinate with infantry for quite a while, preventing a faster advance. It was only after Army Group South had its attention taken from Warsaw at the Battle of Bzura that Guderian's armor was fully unleashed. There were still lingering tendencies to reserve Germany's armor, even if in independent divisions, to cover an infantry advance or the flanks of advancing infantry armies. Although tank production was increased to 125 tanks per month after the Polish Campaign, losses forced the Germans to draw further strength from Czech tank designs, and light tanks continued to form the majority of Germany's armored strength.

The occupation of Czechoslovakia in March 1939 had provided the German military with large quantity of high-quality weapons at no cost, from the arsenal of the Czech military. There was enough equipment for about 40 army divisions. The Germans integrated the Czech industry, mainly the Škoda factories, becoming part of the German military production machine and continued to produce tanks and other weapons for Germany. So when Germany invaded France, three full German Panzer divisions were equipped with Czech tanks. One division was equipped with the Czech type 35 light tank (10 long tons (10 t)) known as Panzer 35(t), and two divisions were equipped with the type 38 light tank (10 long tons (10 t)) renamed Panzer 38(t). The Panzer 35 had a crew of four and carried a Czech 37 mm (1.46 in) gun (with 72 rounds) and two machine guns, one coaxial and remained in front line service until 1942, when they were converted for other roles. The Panzer 38 had a crew of four and carried a Czech 37 mm (1.46 in) gun (with 90 rounds) and two machine guns, one coaxial and one in the front (with 2550 rounds). 1400 tanks were produced for the German army in 1939-1942 and many variants used its chassis, including the Hetzer, a tank destroyer with a 75 mm (2.95 in) gun.

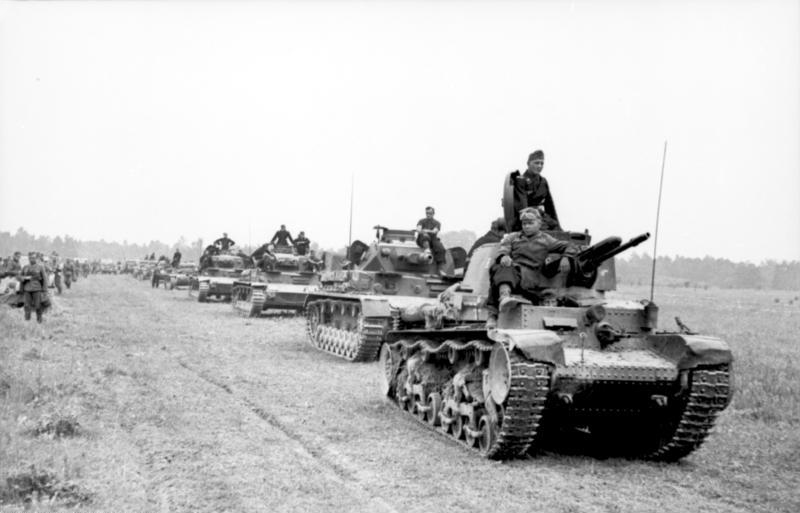
Panzer 35(t) in France, 1940

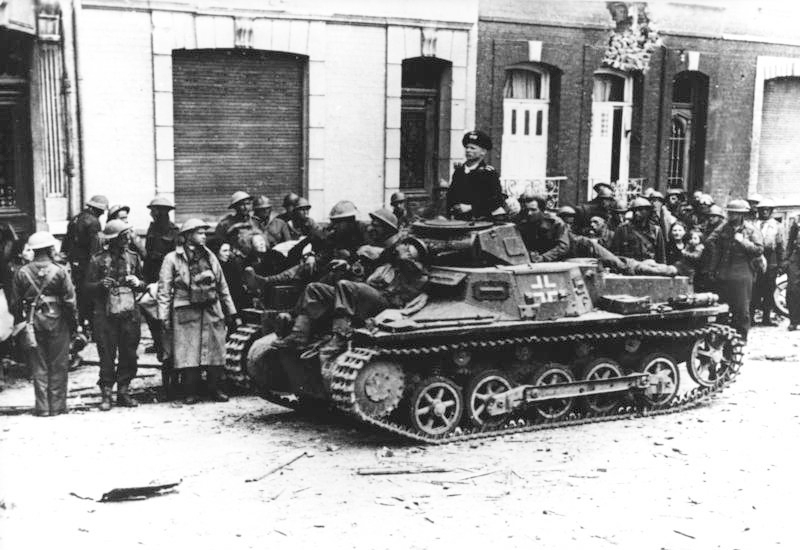
A Panzer I Ausf B on the streets of Calais, France in May 1940, while rounding up British prisoners of war

Despite its obsolescence, the Panzer I was also used in the invasion of France in May 1940. Of 2,574 tanks available for the campaign, no fewer than 523 were Panzer I's. There were only 627 Panzer III and IV medium tanks. At least a fifth of Germany's armor was composed of Panzer I's, while almost four-fifths was light tanks of one type or another, including 955 Panzer II, 106 Czech Panzer 35(t), and 228 Panzer 38(t). The French Army had up to 4,000 tanks, including 300 Char B1 heavy tanks, armed with a 47 mm (1.85 in) gun in the turret and a larger 75 mm (2.95 in) low-velocity howitzer in the hull. The French also had around 250 Somua S-35, widely regarded as one of the best tanks of the period, armed with the same 47 mm (1.85 in) main gun and protected by almost 55 mm (2.17 in) of armor at its thickest point. The French forces also included over 3,000 light tanks, of which 500 were World War one-vintage FT-17s. The two main advantages German armor enjoyed were radios allowing them to coordinate faster than their British or French counterparts and superior tactical doctrine.

The last big campaign in which the Panzer I formed a large portion of the armored strength was Operation Barbarossa, 22 June 1941. The 3,300 German tanks included about 410 Panzer I's. By the end of the month, a large portion of the Red Army found itself trapped in the Minsk pocket, and by 21 September Kiev had fallen, thereby allowing the Germans to concentrate on their ultimate objective, Moscow.

Despite the success of Germany's armor in the Soviet Union, between June and September most German officers were shocked to find their tanks were inferior to newer Soviet models, the T-34 and Kliment Voroshilov (KV) series. Army Group North quickly realized that none of the tank guns currently in use by German armor could penetrate the thick armor of the KV-1. The performance of the Red Army during the Battle of Moscow and the growing numbers of new Soviet tanks made it obvious the Panzer I was not suitable for this front. Some less battle-worthy Panzer I's were tasked with towing lorries through mud to alleviate logistics problems at the front.

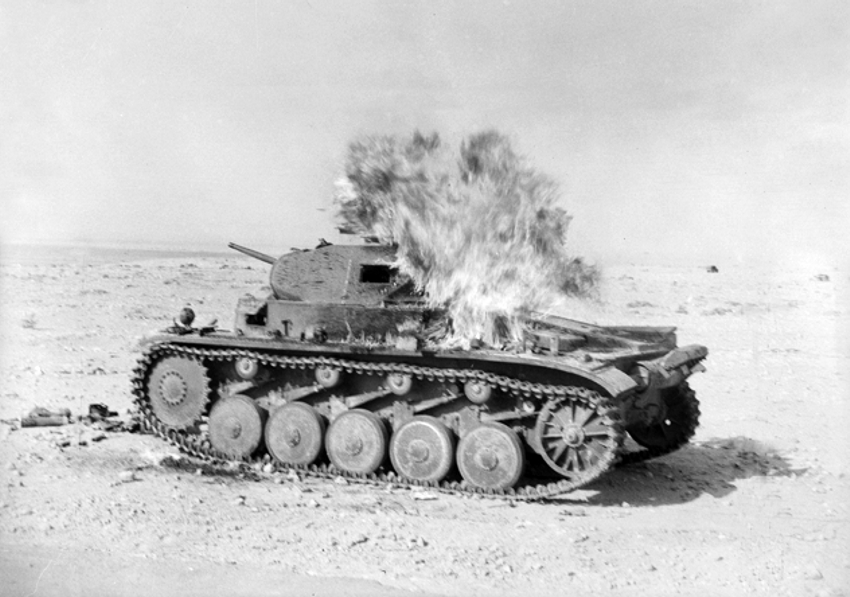
Panzer II burning in Libya, 1941

In the Western Desert, the British Operation Compass pushed Italians out of Egypt back into Libya and destroyed the Italian 10th Army; Hitler dispatched aircraft to Sicily, and a blocking force to North Africa. This blocking force was put under the command of Lieutenant General Erwin Rommel and included the motorized 5th Light Division and the 15th Panzer Division. This force landed at Tunis on 12 February 1941. Upon arrival, Rommel had around 150 tanks, about half Panzer III and IV. The rest were Panzer I's and IIs, although the Panzer I was soon replaced. On 6 April 1941, Germany attacked both Yugoslavia and Greece, with fourteen divisions invading Greece from neighboring Bulgaria, which by then had joined the Tripartite Pact. The invasion of Yugoslavia included no less than six panzer divisions, which still fielded the Panzer I. Yugoslavia surrendered 17 April 1941, and Greece fell on 30 April 1941.

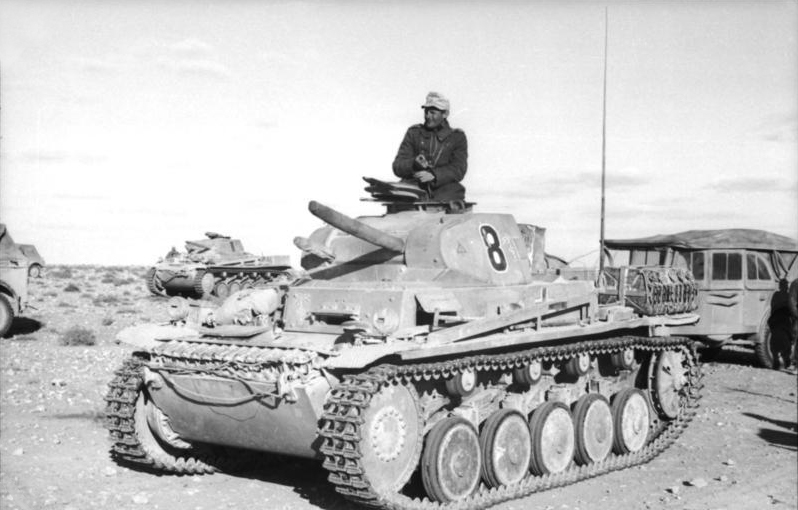
German Panzer II Afrika Korps tank with 20 mm gun and machine-gun in rotating turret.

The Panzer II was the most numerous tank in the German Panzer divisions beginning with the invasion of France, and was used in the German campaigns in Poland, France, the Low Countries, Denmark, Norway, North Africa and the Eastern Front. Originally, Panzerkampfwagen II was the main component of the early Panzer divisions being issued to company and platoon commanders. It was soon after issued to Panzer Battalions and in the Polish Campaign was used as a combat tank. It began to be supplemented in the armoured forces by the Panzer III and IV in 1940/41. Following the reorganization of the Panzertruppen in 1940/41, it was relegated to the role of reconnaissance tank. During the Campaign in the West in 1940 and early stage of the invasion of the Soviet Union in 1941, Panzerkampfwagen II served mainly as reconnaissance but were often used as combat tanks and many were lost to Soviet tanks and anti-tanks. By 1942 a majority were removed from frontline service. Afterwards, it was used to great effect as a reconnaissance tank, and when removed from front-line duty, it was used for training and on secondary fronts. The Panzerkampfwagen II tanks were also used in North Africa, by the German Afrika Korps, with some success as the nature of the battlefield was more mobile and shortages of equipment forced Rommel to use them lacking updated replacements.

Despite increasing production of the medium Panzer IIIs and IVs prior to the German invasion of France on 10 May 1940, the majority of German tanks were still light types. According to Guderian, the Wehrmacht invaded France with 523 Panzer Is, 955 Panzer IIs, 349 Panzer IIIs, 278 Panzer IVs, 106 Panzer 35(t)s and 228 Panzer 38(t)s. Around the time of Operation Barbarossa, the Panzer III was numerically the most important German tank. At this time the majority of the available tanks (including re-armed Ausf. E and F, plus new Ausf. G and H models) had the 50-millimetre (2.0 in) KwK 38 L/42 cannon which also equipped the majority of the tanks in North Africa. Initially, the Panzer III's were outclassed and outnumbered by Soviet T-34 and KV tanks.

However, the most numerous Soviet tanks were the T-26 and BT tanks. This, along with superior German tactical skill, crew training, and the good ergonomics of the Panzer III all contributed to a rough 6:1 favourable kill ratio for German tanks of all types in 1941. The Panzer III was used throughout the war and a handful were still in use in Normandy and at Arnhem in 1944, but most were replaced with Panzer IV or the newer Panther.

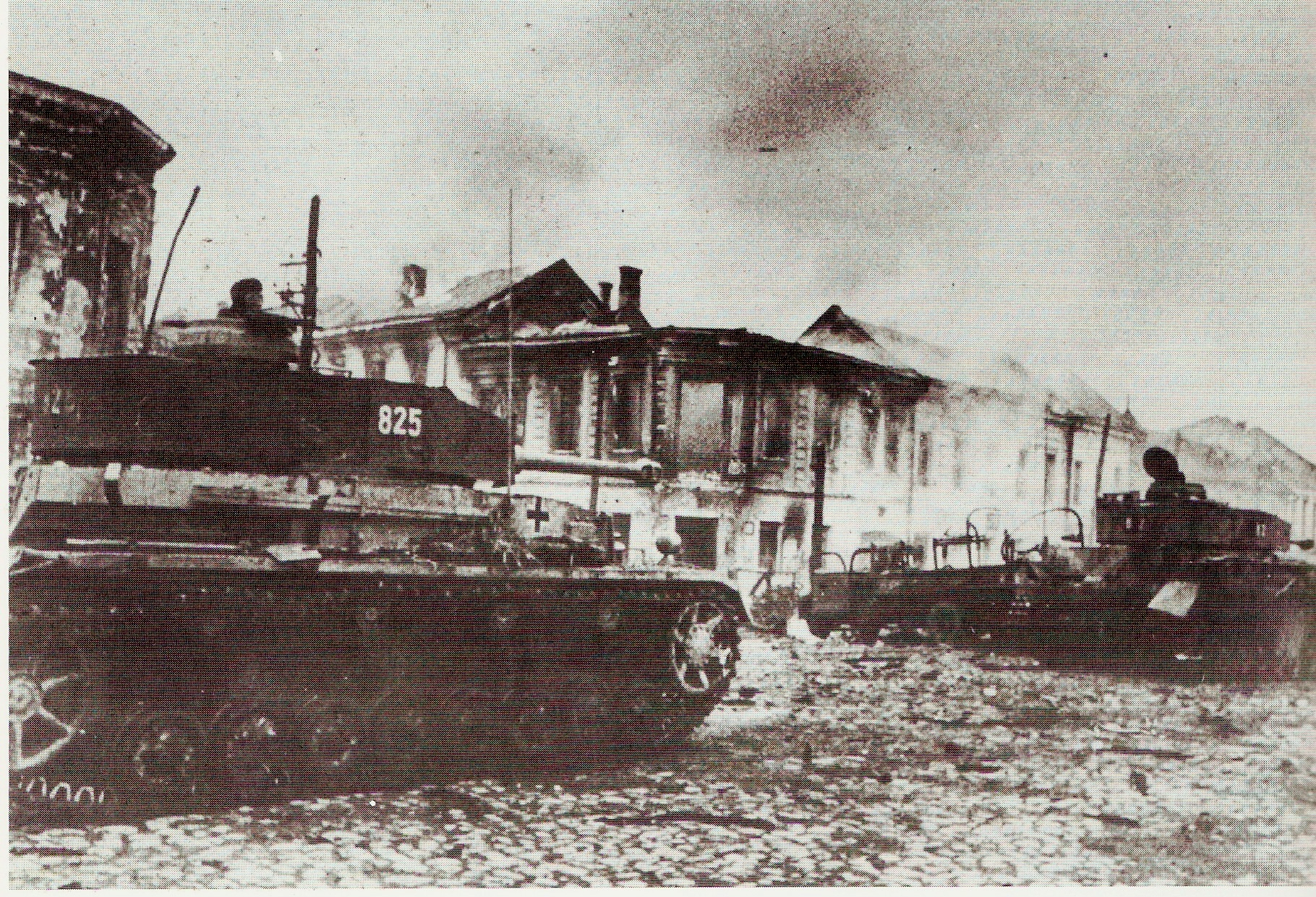
Panzer IVs operating in Russia, November 1943

In the early battles of Second World War, German forces had gained notoriety for the rapid and successful invasions of Poland, the Netherlands, Belgium, and France, and the Soviet Union, in 1939–41. Although the early-war Panzer II, III, and IV were clearly inferior to some of their French and Soviet counterparts, this blitzkrieg ('lightning warfare') was made possible by training and organization, integrated communications with the combined-arms employment of integrated infantry, armoured forces and aircraft.

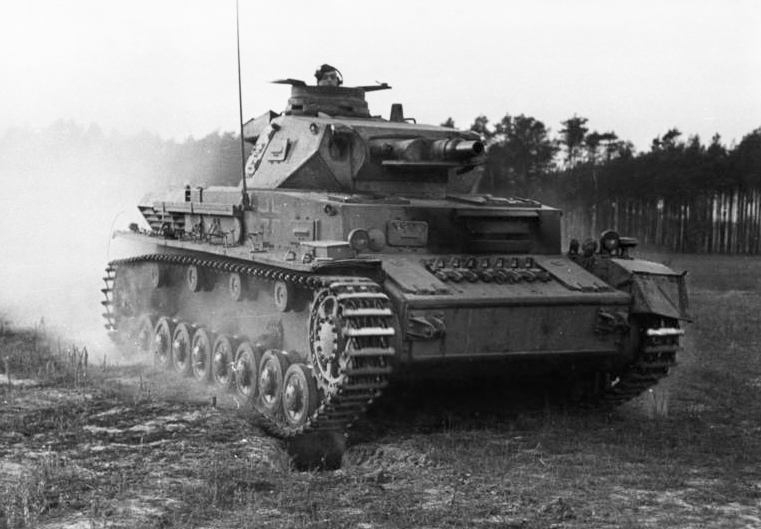
Panzer IV Ausf. C

Although the Panzer IV was deployed to North Africa with the German Afrika Korps, until the longer gun variant began production, the tank was outperformed by the Panzer III with respect to armor penetration. Both the Panzer III and IV had difficulty in penetrating the British Matilda II's thick armor, while the Matilda's 40-mm QF 2 pounder gun could knock out either German tank; its major disadvantage was its low speed. By August 1942, Rommel had only received 27 Panzer IV Ausf. F2s, armed with the L/43 gun, which he deployed to spearhead his armored offensives. The longer gun could penetrate all American and British tanks in use in North Africa at ranges of up to 1,500 m (4,900 ft). Although more of these tanks arrived in North Africa between August and October 1942, their numbers were insignificant compared to the amount of materiel shipped to British forces.

The Panzer IV was the only German tank to remain in both production and combat throughout World War II, and measured over the entire war it comprised 30% of the Wehrmacht's total tank strength. It came into service by early 1939, in time for the occupation of Czechoslovakia, but at the start of the war the majority of German armor was made up of obsolete Panzer Is and Panzer IIs.

As the blitzkrieg began to stall on the Eastern Front, and a mobile war pushed back and forth across North Africa, Germany was quickly forced into an arms race in armour and antitank weapons. 88 mm antiaircraft guns were used as antitank weapons, thousands of captured Soviet antitank guns were marshaled into German service as the 7.62 cm PaK 36(r), and new inexpensive self-propelled anti-tank guns Panzerjäger such as the Marder I series were put into production, while the Panzer III & IV tanks & the Sturmgeschütz were hastily up-armoured and up-gunned.

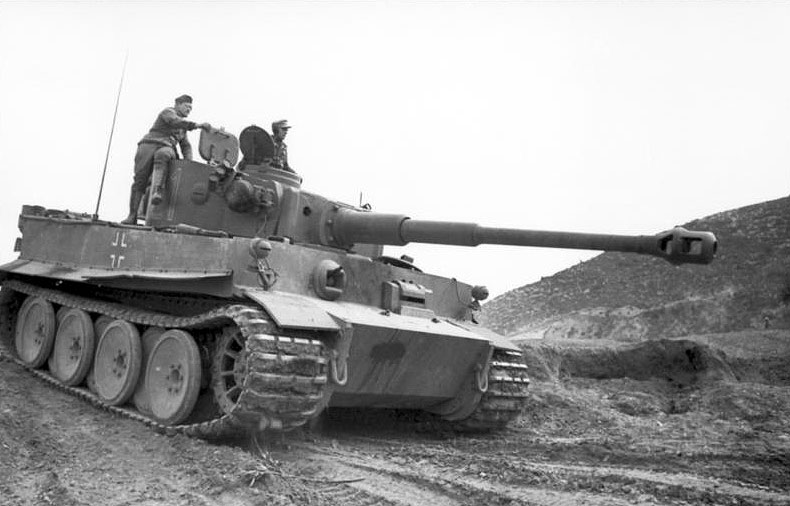
A Tiger I deployed to supplement the Afrika Korps operating in Tunisia, January 1943.

A new generation of big tanks, the heavy Tiger, Panther, and King Tiger tanks were developed and rushed into the battlefield. The Panther was a direct response to the Soviet [T-34 and KV-1 tanks. First encountered on 23 June 1941, the T-34 outclassed the existing Panzer III and IV. The Panther tank were rushed to the front in January, 1943 and took part in Operation Zitadelle, and the attack was delayed several times because of their mechanical problems, with the eventual start date of the battle only six days after the last Panthers had been delivered to the front. This resulted in major problems in Panther units during the Battle of Kursk, as tactical training at the unit level, coordination by radio, and driver training were all seriously deficient. During Zitadelle the Panthers claimed 267 destroyed tanks. The Panther demonstrated its capacity to destroy any Soviet AFV from long distance during the Battle of Kursk, and had a very high overall kill ratio. However, it comprised less than seven percent of the estimated 2,400–2,700 total AFVs deployed by the Germans in this battle, and its effectiveness was limited by its mechanical problems.

At the time of the invasion of Normandy, there were initially only two Panther-equipped Panzer regiments in the Western Front, and the majority of German Panzer forces in Normandy – six and a half divisions, were stationed around the vital town of Caen facing the Anglo-Canadian forces of the 21st Army Group; and the numerous battles to secure the town became collectively known as the Battle of Caen. US forces in the meantime, engaged mainly the Panzer Lehr Division, and the Panther tank proved to be most effective when fighting in open country and shooting at long range—its combination of superior armor and firepower allowed it to engage at distances from which the American M4 Shermans could not respond.

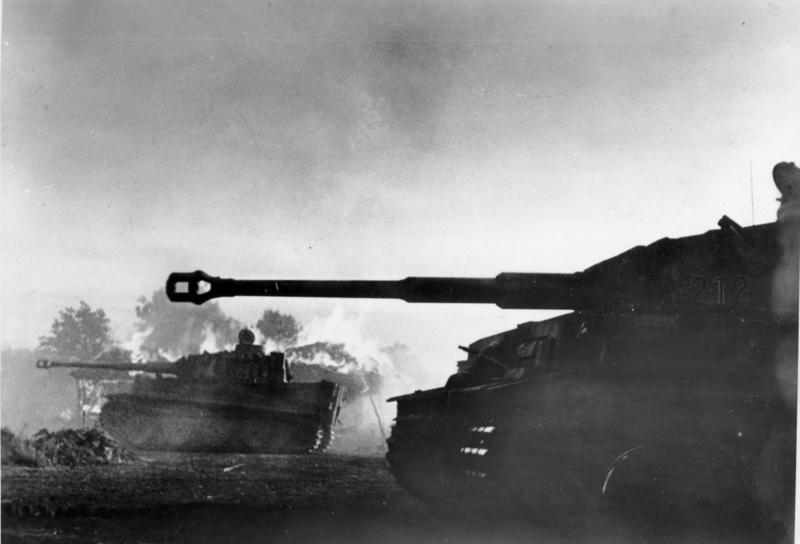
Tiger I tanks spearhead the assault in the Battle of Kursk.

The Tiger was first used in action on 23 September 1942 near Leningrad. Under pressure from Hitler, the tank was put into action months earlier than planned. Many early models proved to be mechanically unreliable; in this first action many broke down. Others were knocked out by dug-in Soviet anti-tank guns. In the Tiger's first actions in North Africa, it was able to dominate Allied tanks in the wide-open terrain. The Tiger was originally designed to be an offensive breakthrough weapon, but by the time they went into action, the military situation had changed dramatically, and their main use was on the defensive, and their mechanical failures meant that there were rarely more than a few in each action.

Tigers were usually employed in separate German heavy tank battalions (schwere-Panzer-Abteilung) under army command. These battalions would be deployed to critical sectors, either for breakthrough operations or, more typically, counter-attacks. The first time the Tiger saw action was on August 29 of 1942 and September 21/22 at Mga, southeast of Leningrad with 1st company of sPzAbt 502. The unsuccessful engagements ended in the new Tiger being captured by the Soviets, who then examined it and exhibited during the captured equipment exhibition in Moscow's Gorky Park in 1943. The failure of the Tiger was attributed to mechanical problems as well as poor terrain conditions, totally unsuitable for heavy tanks. In December 1942, Tigers from sPzAbt 501, saw action near Tunis in North Africa. During their combat service, Tigers destroyed large numbers of enemy tanks and other equipment, creating the myth of their invincibility and fearsome power - "Tiger-phobia". The Tiger also had tremendous effect on morale of both German and Allied soldiers, Germans felt secure, while the Allies thought that every German tank, especially late model PzKpfw IV was a Tiger.

The first combat use of the Tiger II was by the 1st company of the Schwere Heers Panzer Abteilung 503 during the Battle of Normandy, opposing Operation Atlantic between Troarn and Demouville on 18 July 1944; losses were two from combat, plus the company commander's tank which became irrecoverably trapped after falling into a bomb crater made during the simultaneous Operation Goodwood.

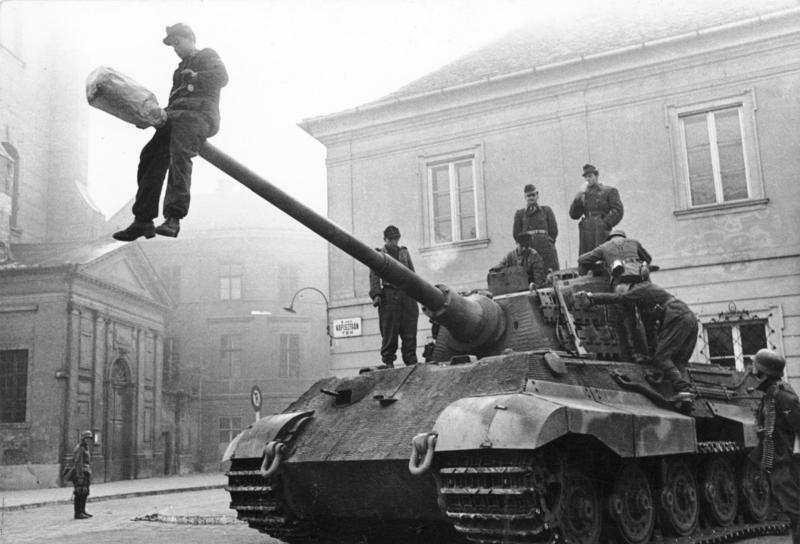
A Tiger II mounting an 8.8 cm KwK 43 gun, Budapest 1944

On the Eastern Front, it was first used on 12 August 1944 by the Schwere Heers Panzer Abteilung 501 (s.H.Pz.Abt. 501) resisting the Lvov–Sandomierz Offensive. It attacked the Soviet bridgehead over the Vistula River near Baranów Sandomierski. The majority of King Tigers went to Wehrmacht units, while some 150 were assigned to the Waffen SS. The first Tigers II tanks reached schwere Panzer Abteilungen of both Wehrmacht and Waffen SS as early as February 1944. Only two companies of Schwere Heers Panzer Abteilung 503 (s.H.Pz.Abt. 503), equipped with Tiger II tanks (with Porsche turrets), were committed to the fighting in Normandy. Tiger II tanks of schwere Panzerabteilung 506 (s.Pz.Abt. 506), saw combat during the Operation Market Garden in the Netherlands in September 1944.

On 15 October 1944 Tiger IIs of s.H.Pz.Abt. 503 played a crucial role during Operation Panzerfaust, supporting Otto Skorzeny's troops in taking the Hungarian capital of Budapest, which ensured that the country remained with the Axis until the end of the war.

The Tiger II was also present at the Ardennes Offensive of December 1944, the Soviet Vistula–Oder and East Prussian Offensives in January 1945, the German Lake Balaton Offensive in Hungary in March 1945, the Battle of the Seelow Heights in April 1945, and finally the Battle of Berlin at the end of the war.

During the war, the mass of a panzer increased from the 5.4 tonnes (6.0 tons) of a pre-war Panzer I light tank, to 68.5 tonnes (75.5 tons) of the Tiger II. In the meantime, the Soviets continued to produce the T-34 by the tens of thousands, and U.S. industry nearly matched them in the number of M4 Sherman tanks built and deployed in Western Europe.

=== Cold War ===
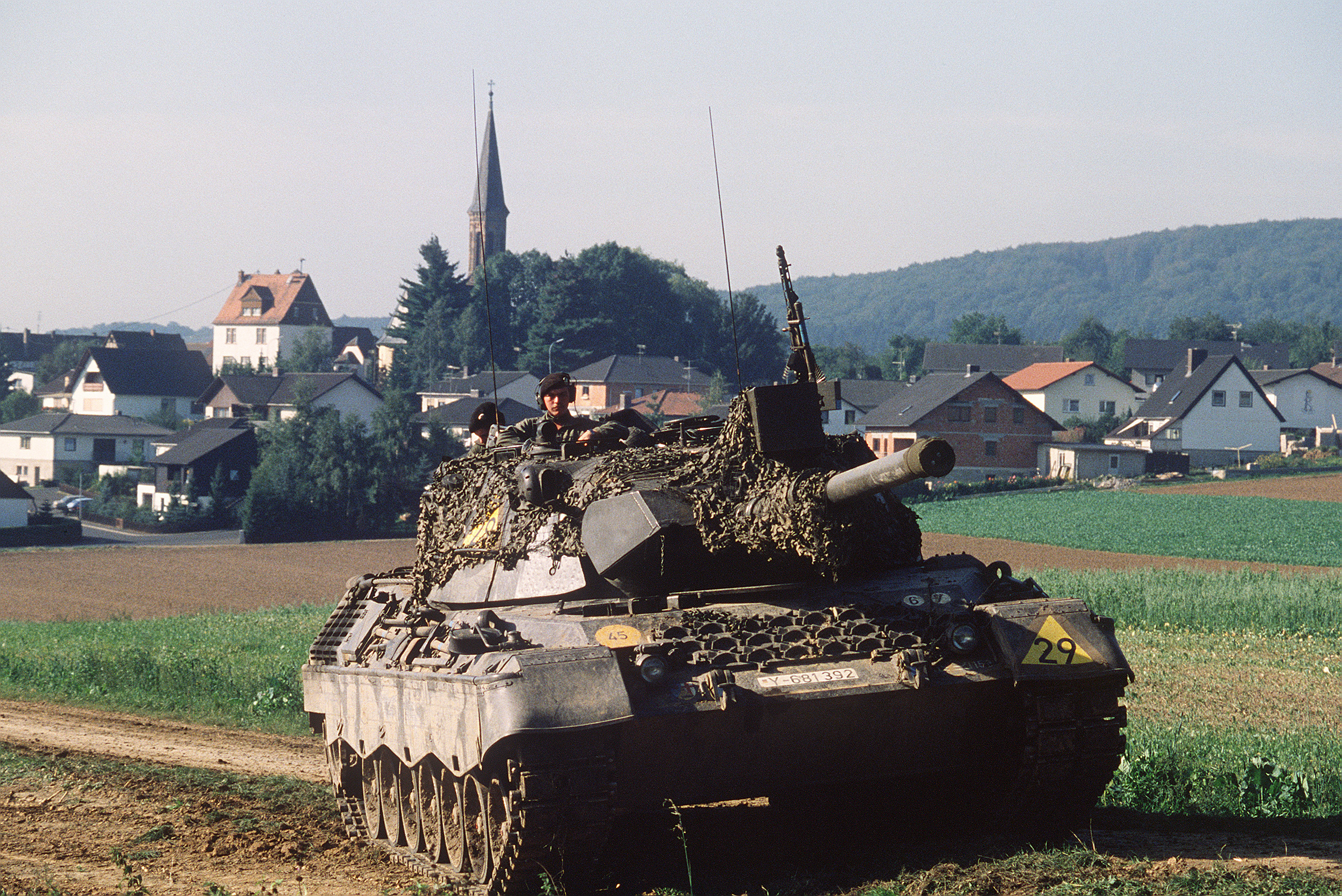
German Army Leopard 1A1

After the war, West Germany was given United States-built M47 and M48 Patton tanks and in 1956 the Germans began development of the Leopard tank project to build a modern German tank, the Standard-Panzer, to replace the Bundeswehr's outdated tanks.

The German Leopard (later known as Leopard 1) tank first entered service in 1965. The Leopard used a German-built version of the British 105 mm L7 gun, and had improved cross-country performance that was unmatched by other designs of the era. The Leopard quickly became a standard of European forces, and eventually served as the main battle tank in over a dozen countries worldwide, but the German Leopards never saw combat.

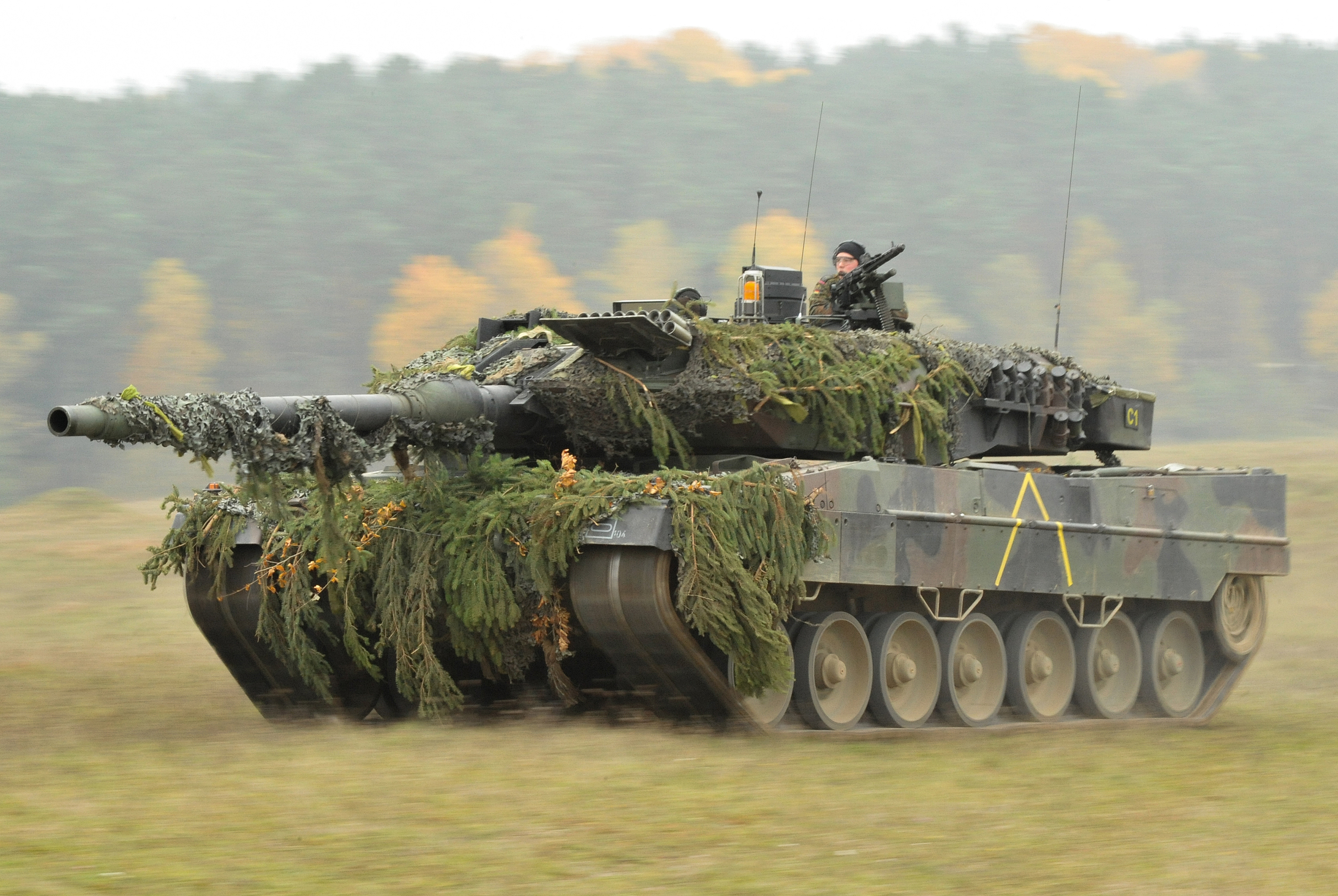
A German Army Leopard 2A6, assigned to the 104th Panzer Battalion conducting high-speed manoeuvres

The Leopard 1 was phased out of the German Army in 2003, but Leopard 1-derived vehicles are still widely used. The Leopard 2 has taken over the MBT role, first entering service in 1979. The Leopard 2 has served in the armed forces of Germany and twelve other European countries, as well as several non-European nations. More than 3,480 Leopard 2s have been manufactured. The Leopard 2 first saw combat in Kosovo with the German Army.

=== KFOR ===
The German contingent of the Kosovo Force (KFOR) operated a number of Leopard 2A4s and 2A5s in Kosovo during the NATO-led international peacekeeping force responsible for establishing a secure environment.

== Future ==
The Panther KF51 (KF is short for German "Kettenfahrzeug" lit. 'tracked vehicle') is a German fourth-generation main battle tank (MBT) that is under development by Rheinmetall Landsysteme (part of Rheinmetall's Vehicle Systems division). It was unveiled publicly at the Eurosatory defence exhibition on 13 June 2022.

The Leopard 3 is a fourth-generation German main battle tank. Beginning in the 2030s, the German Bundeswehr will develop and issue the Leopard 3 as an interim solution until the introduction of the Main Ground Combat System (MGCS) in the 2040s.

== List of tanks in the German Army ==
=== World War I ===
- A7V
- A7V-U
- K-Wagen (Prototype)
- LK I (prototype)
- LK II (prototype)
- Orionwagen
- Sturmpanzerwagen Oberschlesien

=== Interwar period ===
- Leichttraktor
- Grosstraktor (prototype)
- Neubaufahrzeug (prototype)
- Durchbruchswagen I
- Cheetah VI34A15 (project)
- Durchbruchswagen II

=== World War II ===
- Panzer I
- Panzer I Ausf. C - airborne light tank
- Panzer I Ausf. F - also known as VK 18.01, 30 built in 1942
- Panzer II
- Panzer II Ausf. L "Luchs"
- Panzer 35(t)
- Panzer 38(t)
- Panzer III
- Panzer IV
- VK 1602 Leopard
- VK 30.01 (H) (prototype)
- VK 30.01 (P) (Prototype)
- VK 36.01 (H) (prototype)
- Panther
- Panther II
- E-50 Standardpanzer (Blueprints only)
- Tiger I
- Tiger (P)
- Tiger II
- VK 45.02 (P)
- Panzer VII Löwe (Blueprints)
- Panzer VIII Maus (Only 2 made)
- E-75 Standardpanzer (Blueprints only)
- E-100 (prototype hull)
- P. 1000 Ratte (Proposed)

=== Cold War to present ===
- Leopard 1
- MBT-70 (Make by Germany and USA)
- Leopard 2
- Spähpanzer SP IC
- Spähpanzer Ru 251
- Panther KF51

=== West Germany and East Germany ===
- M41 Walker Bulldog (US built, operated by West Germany)
- M47 Patton (US built, operated by West Germany)
- M48 Patton (US built, operated by West Germany)
- T-34/85 (Soviet built, operated by East Germany)
- T-54/55 (Soviet built, operated by East Germany)
- T-72 (Soviet built, operated by East Germany)

== See also ==
- History of the tank
- Tanks in World War II
- Tank classification
- List of military vehicles
- List of German combat vehicles of World War II
- German armoured fighting vehicle production during World War II

== Bibliography ==
- Beevor, Antony (1998). Stalingrad: The Fateful Siege: 1942-1943. Penguin. ISBN 978-1-101-15356-7.
- Beevor, Antony (2006) [1983]. The Battle for Spain: The Spanish Civil War 1936–1939. Penguin. ISBN 978-0-14-303765-1.
- Bierman, John; Smith, Colin (2002). The Battle of Alamein: Turning Point, World War II. Viking. ISBN 978-0-670-03040-8.
- Buckley, John (2004). British Armour in the Normandy Campaign, 1944. London: F. Cass. ISBN 978-0-7146-5323-5.
- Candil, Antonio J (March 1999). "Soviet Armor in Spain: Aid Mission to Republicans Tested Doctrine and Equipment" (PDF). Armor. pp. 31–38.
- Cooper, Matthew (1984). The German Army, 1933-1945: Its Political and Military Failure. Bonanza Books. ISBN 978-0-517-43610-3.
- Daley, John (May 1999). "Soviet and German Advisors Put Doctrine to the Test: Tanks in the Siege of Madrid". Armor. pp. 33–37.
- Franco, Lucas Molina (2005). Panzer I: El Inicio de una Saga [Panzer I: The Beginning of a Saga] (in Spanish). Quiron Ediciones. ISBN 978-84-96016-51-4.
- Gander, Terry (2006). PanzerKampfwagen I and II. Ian Allan Publishing. ISBN 978-0-7110-3090-9.
- García, José María Manrique; Franco, Lucas Molina (2006). Las armas de la guerra civil española: el primer estudio global y sistemático del armamento empleado por ambos contendientes (in Spanish). La Esfera de los Libros. ISBN 978-84-9734-475-3.
- Gelbart, Marsh (1996). Tanks main battle and light tanks. Brassey's UK Ltd. ISBN 1-85753-168-X.
- Guderian, Heinz (2015) [1950]. Panzer Leader. Translated by Constantine Fitzgibbon. Verdun Press. ISBN 978-1-78289-302-8.
- Guderian, Heinz (2012) [1937]. Achtung Panzer!. W&N Military. Orion. ISBN 978-1-78022-580-7.
- Hahn, Fritz (1998). Waffen und Geheimwaffen des deutschen Heeres 1933 - 1945 [Weapons and secret weapons of the German army 1933 - 1945] (in German). Bernard und Graefe. ISBN 978-3-89555-128-4.
- Jarymowycz, Roman (2001). Tank Tactics: from Normandy to Lorraine. Boulder: L. Rienner Publishers. ISBN 978-1-55587-950-1.
- Jentz, Thomas; Doyle, Hilary (1997). Germany's Tiger Tanks - Vk45 to Tiger II: Design, Production & Modifications. West Chester: Schiffer Publishing. ISBN 978-0-7643-0224-4.
- Jentz, Thomas; Doyle, Hilary (1993). Kingtiger Heavy Tank, 1942-45. London: Osprey. ISBN 1-85532-282-X.
- Jentz, Thomas (1996). Panzertruppen 2: The Complete Guide to the Creation & Combat Employment of Germany's Tank Force 1943-1945. Schiffer. ISBN 978-0-7643-0080-6.
- Kozłowski, Eugeniusz (1979). Wojna obronna Polski, 1939 [Poland's defensive war, 1939] (in Polish). Warszawa: Wydaw. Min. Obrony Narodowej. ISBN 978-83-11-06314-3.
- Latimer, Jon (2002). Alamein. Harvard University Press. ISBN 978-0-674-01016-1.
- McCarthy, Peter; Syron, Mike (2002). Panzerkrieg: The Rise and Fall of Hitler's Tank Divisions. Constable. ISBN 978-1-4721-0780-0.
- Manchester, William (2003). The Arms of Krupp, 1587-1968: The Rise and Fall of the Industrial Dynasty That Armed Germany at War. Boston: Back Bay Books. ISBN 978-0-316-52940-2.
- Moa, Luis Pío (2022) [2003]. Los Mitos De La Guerra Civil [The Myths of the Civil War] (in Spanish). La Esfera de los Libros. ISBN 978-84-1384-467-1.
- Perrett, Bryan (1983). German Light Panzers 1932-42. Osprey. ISBN 978-0-85045-483-3.
- Perrett, Bryan (1999). Sturmartillerie and Panzerjager 1939-45. London: Osprey. ISBN 978-1-84176-004-9.
- Pöhlmann, Markus (2016). Der Panzer und die Mechanisierung des Krieges: Eine deutsche Geschichte 1890 bis 1945. Paderborn: Ferdinand Schöningh. ISBN 978-3-506-78355-4.
- Porch, Douglas (2004). The Path to Victory: The Mediterranean Theater in World War II. Farrar, Straus and Giroux. ISBN 978-0-374-52976-5.
- Ramos, Raúl Arias (2005). La Legión Cóndor en la Guerra Civil: el apoyo militar alemán a Franco [The Condor Legion in the Civil War: German military support for Franco] (in Spanish). Planeta DeAgostini. ISBN 978-8-4674-2553-6.
- Ryan, Cornelius (1966). The Last Battle: The Classic History of the Battle for Berlin. Simon and Schuster. ISBN 978-1-4391-2701-8.
- Schneider, Wolfgang (1990). Elefant Jagdtiger Sturmtiger: Rarities of the Tiger Family. West Chester: Schiffer Publishing. ISBN 978-0-88740-239-5.
- Schneider, Wolfgang (2000). Tigers in Combat I. Mechanicsburg: Stackpole Books. ISBN 978-0-8117-3171-3.
- Schneider, Wolfgang (2005). Tigers in Combat II. Mechanicsburg: Stackpole Books. ISBN 978-0-8117-3203-1.
- Stahel, David (2023). Hitler's Panzer Generals: Guderian, Hoepner, Reinhardt and Schmidt Unguarded. Cambridge University Press. ISBN 978-1-009-28278-9.
- Számvéber, Norbert (2000). Nehézpáncélosok. A német 503. nehézpáncélos-osztály magyarországi harcai [They are heavily armored: The battles of the German 503rd Heavy Armored Division in Hungary.] (in Hungarian). Hadtörténeti Levéltár. ISBN 963-00-2526-4.
- White, B.T. (1983). Tanks and other Armoured Fighting Vehicles of World War II. New York: Exeter Books. p. 5. ISBN 0-671-06009-0.
- Wilbeck, Christopher (2004). Sledgehammers: Strengths and Flaws of Tiger Tank Battalions in World War II. The Aberjona Press. ISBN 978-0-9717650-2-3.
- Zaloga, Steve (1994). IS-2 Heavy Tank 1944-1973. London: Osprey Publishing (UK). ISBN 978-1-85532-396-4.
- Zaloga, S.J. (2006). German Panzers 1914–18. Bloomsbury USA. ISBN 978-1-84176-945-5.
- Zaloga, Steve (2008). Armored Thunderbolt: The U.S. Army Sherman in World War II. Stackpole Books. ISBN 978-0-8117-0424-3.
