= Frank Mitchell (tank commander) =

WW1 Tank Commander

Lt. Frank Mitchell
- Image of Frank Mitchell dating to around 1918
- Born: c. 1893; England
- Died: Aft. 1933; England
- Occupation: Tank Commander
- Years active: 1916-1918
- Era: WW1
- Employer: Royal Tank regiment
- Title: Second Lieutenant
- Awards: Military Cross, Victory Medal, British War Medal

Second Lieutenant Frank Mitchell (c. 1893—aft. 1933) was a British tank commander in the First World War who was notable for being the tank commander during the first ever tank engagement; the Second Battle of Villers-Bretonneux, which took place on the 24 April 1918.

== Service in WW1 ==
Lt. Frank Mitchell served in the 1st Section, A company of the 1st battalion of the Tank corps, which was established in 1916.

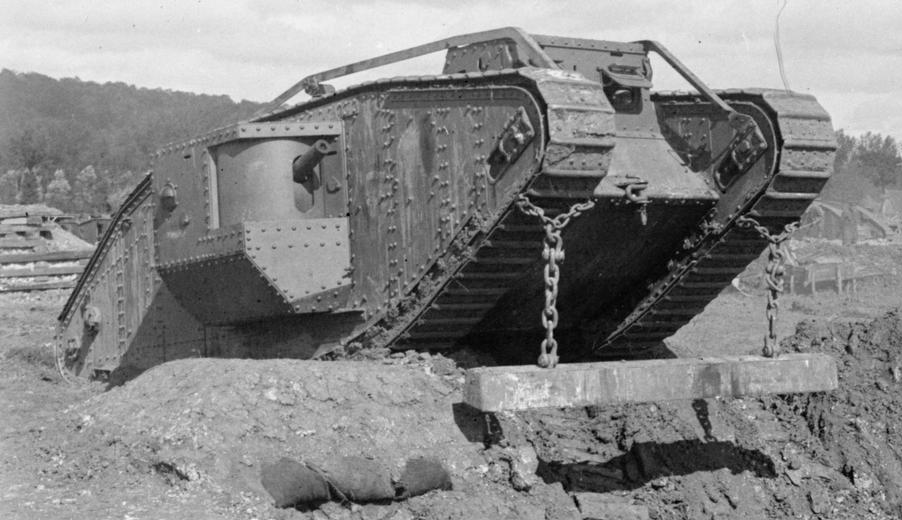
Mark IV tank

On the evening of the 23 April to the early morning hours of the 24 April, the German military began a military bombardment which also included mustard gas, of which the crew of Mitchell’s Mark IV male tank were exposed to, leaving only three out of the seven crew members in any state to operate the Mark IV, these three crew members were still partially wounded due to the gas attack; Sgt. McKenzie who was operating the 6 Pounder gun the tank had equipped was partially blinded in his right eye. On the hazy morning of 24 April 1918, Frank Mitchell’s tank was assigned to guarding the railway switch line at the hamlet of Cachy, near to Villers-Bretonneux. Lt. Mitchell was warned about the approaching German tanks and at around midday the German A7Vs were spotted coming out of the fog. The German tanks charged towards Mitchell’s tank and the two accompanying Female Mark IVs. the female Mark IVs were only lightly gunned and were forced to retreat after the A7V “Nixe” (commanded by Wilhelm Blitz) took out one and started machine gunning the other, leaving Mitchell’s male Mark IV alone and without support. Mitchell’s tank charged towards Nixe, firing highly explosive rounds at the German tank (all of which missed due to the lurching of the Mark IV tank, and because the A7V was moving, making it difficult to hit). Mitchell decided his best course of action was to halt his tank and properly aim, this worked and the Nixe was hit by three shells. The two other A7Vs (Siegfried and Schnuck) drove away, fearing the same fate as Nixe. The last surviving A7V tank Mephisto was also present at the battle.

Afterward Mitchell started to attack the German infantry, before multiple Mark A “Whippets” came to his aid, however in the fighting Mitchell’s tank was hit by an artillery shell, damaging the track and forcing the crew to flee to a nearby trench. Mitchell’s tank was later recovered.

After this battle Lt. Frank Mitchell was awarded the Military Cross (MC) for gallantry during active operations against the enemy. At the end of the war he also received the Victory medal and the British War medal.

In 1933 Lt. Frank Mitchell published a book called “Tank Warfare: The story of the tanks in the Great War” recounting his experiences during the War in the Tank Corps from 1916 to the end of the war and later improvements in tank technology. The book contains multiple drawings, sketches and photographs of early tanks and early tank warfare. Lt. Frank Mitchell stated in his book that:

One of the drawbacks of tanks in battle is the total lack of any means of communication with other tanks. When once inside, with doors bolted, flaps shut and loop holes closed, one can only make signs to a tank very near at hand by taking the great risk of opening the manhole in the roof and waving a handkerchief or a shovel.

— Frank Mitchell, Tank Warfare, p. 66
