= Überlandwagen =

- Type: Supply carrier
- Place of origin: German Empire

Service history
- In service: September 1917 - November 1918
- Used by: German Empire
- Wars: World War I

Production history
- Designer: Joseph Vollmer
- Designed: 1916
- Manufacturer: Daimler-Benz

Specifications
- Crew: 2
- Engine: 2×Daimler 4-cylinder 200 hp (149 kW)
- Suspension: Holt track, vertical springs
- Maximum speed: 13 km/h (8.1 mph)

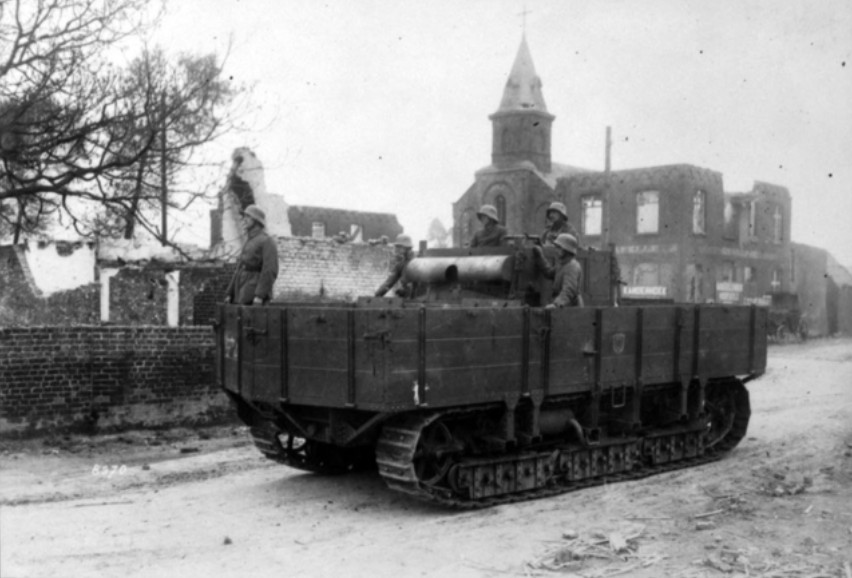
Uberlandwagen in action

The Überlandwagen ("Over-land vehicle") was a tracked supply carrier built on the chassis of the German A7V Sturmpanzerwagen tank. When the A7V was first developed, the design committee made allowance for the chassis to be fitted with an alternative load carrying body.

== Description ==
The Überlandwagen shared a common chassis with the A7V tank; both having suspension derived from the American Holt tractor and twin 100 hp Daimler engines centrally mounted. A driving position was sited on a platform above the engines, with dual sets of controls for driving in either direction to avoid the need to turn the vehicle. A canopy was fitted over the driving position, and wooden dropsides and ends were fitted at the front and rear of the vehicle. Some examples had rails added to support a tarpaulin over the load spaces. Towing hooks were fitted at both ends of the chassis.

The vehicle had a top speed of 13 km/h (8.1 mph) and was manned by a driver and an assistant.

== Service ==
A production run of 30 Überlandwagen was projected but it was not completed before the end of the war. By the end of September 1917, an experimental transport column had been formed equipped with eight Überlandwagens, the ArmeeKraftwagen-Kolonne-Raupe Nr 1111. It was despatched to Northern France in November 1917, and initial reports indicated that the vehicles worked well. They were used up until the end of the war, chiefly to transport general stores and ammunition up to front line positions.

Two vehicles closely resembling the A7V tank (one of them named "Hedi") were constructed after the war and used by government troops, or Freikorps, to quell civil unrest in Berlin in 1919. It is thought that they were constructed using Überlandwagen chassis. They were armed with machine guns, but it is not known whether the bodies were of armour plate or milled steel.

== See also ==
- Tanks in the German Army
