= Sturmpanzerwagen Oberschlesien =

German tank project

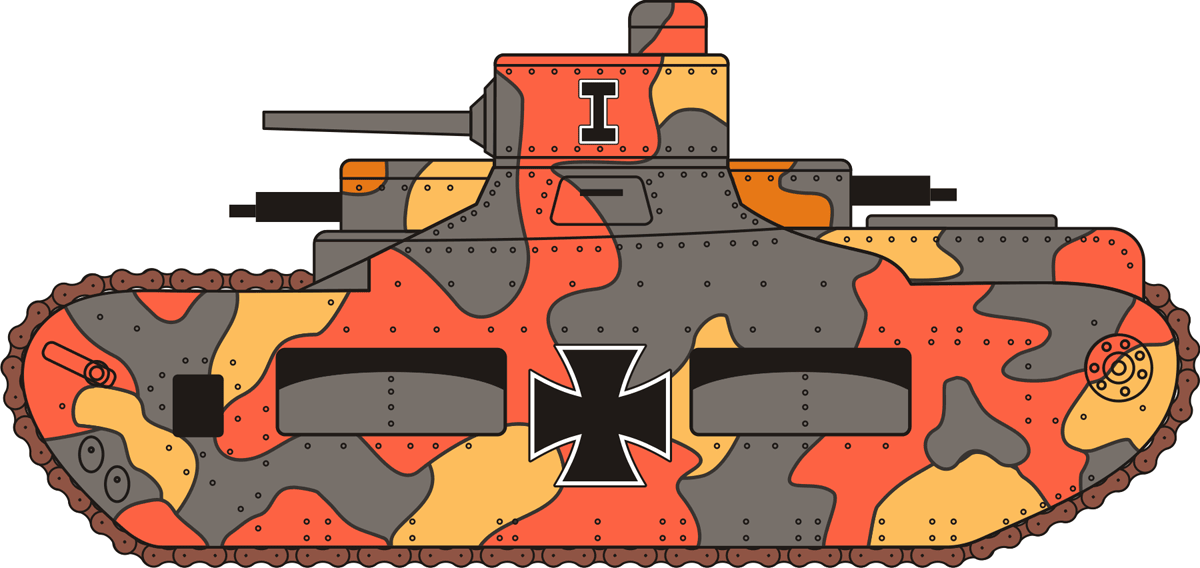
- Type: Assault Tank
- Place of origin: German Empire

Service history
- In service: Never used

Specifications
- Mass: ~19 t
- Length: 6.7 m (22 ft)
- Width: 2.34 m (7.7 ft)
- Height: 2.9 m (9.5 ft)
- Crew: 5
- Armor: 14 mm (0.55 in)
- Main armament: 1 x 57 mm (2.2 in) or 37 mm (1.5 in) cannon
- Secondary armament: 2 x 8 mm MG 08 machineguns
- Engine: Argus As III; 190 hp (140 kW)
- Power/weight: 10 hp/t (7.4 kW/t)
- Operational range: 60 km (37 miles), ~100 km (62 miles) paved road
- Maximum speed: 16 km/h (9.9 mph) on roads 9 km/h (5.6 mph) off-road

The Sturmpanzerwagen Oberschlesien ("Storm tank Upper Silesia" from German: der Sturm, the storm; German: der Panzerwagen the tank) was a German tank project of the First World War. It was a radical design for a fast-moving, lightly armoured assault tank.

The Oberschlesien included a track which was placed under the tank and only wrapped around half of it. The design sacrificed armour for the sake of speed and only required a 180 hp (130 kW) engine for the 19 ton body, giving it a projected ground speed of 16 km/h (9.9 mph) on roads and 16 km/h (9.9 mph) cross country.

The tank featured such advanced features as the main armament mounted on top of the tank in a centrally placed revolving turret, separate fighting and engine compartments, a rear-mounted engine and a low track run.

== History ==
Towards the end of the First World War it was clear that the only operational German tank, the A7V, was too expensive to produce and had too large a crew. Therefore, it was decided that a lighter tank was required which could spearhead assaults and which could be mass-produced.

Thirteen companies bid for the contract and in the middle of 1918, construction of a design by Captain Müller was assigned to the Oberschlesien Eisenwerk of Gleiwitz, which had partially completed two prototypes by October. The project received the pseudonym Oberschlesien (Upper Silesia).

Neither the ordered test models, nor the improved "Oberschlesien II" already planned were finished before the end of the war.

== See also ==
- LK I
