= Second Battle of Villers-Bretonneux =

1918 battle of the First World War

- Part of Operation Michael (German spring offensive)
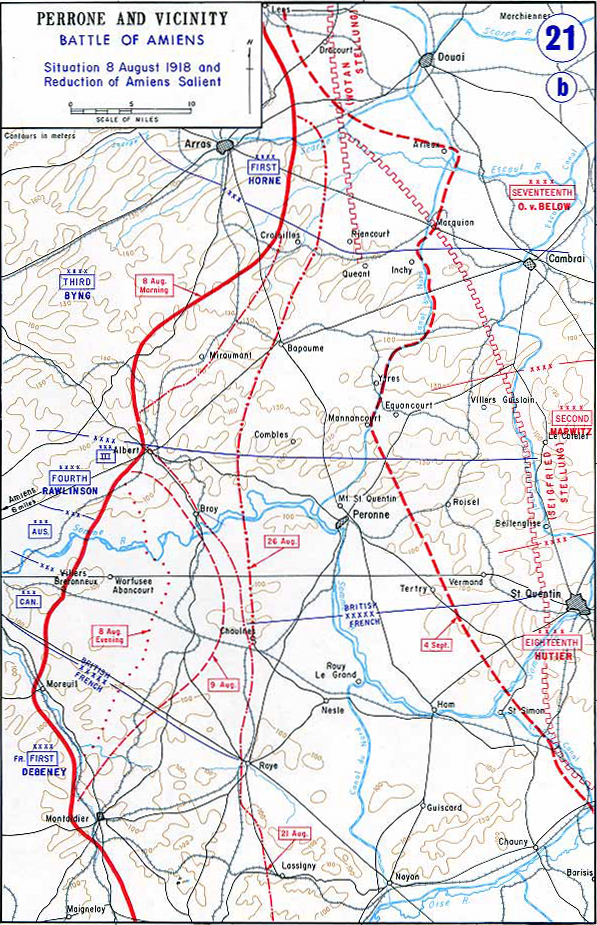
- 1918 map showing vicinity of Villers-Bretonneux
| Date | 24–27 April 1918 |
| Location | Villers-Bretonneux, Northern France 49°52′03″N 2°31′15″E |
| Result | Allied victory |

Belligerents
| British Empire: Australia; United Kingdom; France: French Morocco; (French Third Republic) French Madagascar; French Foreign Legion | German Empire |

Commanders and leaders
| (French Third Republic) Ferdinand Foch (United Kingdom of Great Britain and Ireland) Douglas Haig (United Kingdom of Great Britain and Ireland) Henry Rawlinson (Australia) Harold Elliott (Australia) Thomas William Glasgow (Australia) Talbot Hobbs | (German Empire) Erich Ludendorff (German Empire) (Kingdom of Bavaria) Crown Prince Rupprecht of Bavaria (German Empire) Georg von der Marwitz |

Strength
| Australian 13th, 14th and 15th Brigades; 173rd Brigade of British 58th Division; Remnants of British 8th Division; Moroccan Division; 3 Mark IV tanks (one male, two female); 7 Medium Mark A Whippet tanks | 228th Infantry Division; 4th Guards Infantry Division; 13 A7V tanks |

Casualties and losses
| (Australia) 2,473 (United Kingdom of Great Britain and Ireland) 9,529 (French Third Republic) 3,470 | c. 10,400 2 tanks lost |
- Villers-Bretonneux, a commune in the Somme department of northern France

The Second Battle of Villers-Bretonneux (also Actions of Villers-Bretonneux, after the First Battles of the Somme, 1918) took place from 24 to 27 April 1918, during the German spring offensive to the east of Amiens. It is notable for being the first occasion on which tanks fought against each other; it was the biggest and most successful tank action of the German army in the First World War.

In his memoirs Frank Mitchell claims that he encountered three German A7V tanks while attacking with three British Mark IV tanks. However, according to research by Ralf Raths, director of the Deutsches Panzermuseum (German tank museum), this account cannot be accurate. The A7Vs were not moving together, as confirmed by both German and British combat reports. Mitchell and his three Mark IVs encountered the A7V “Nixe”. Nixe took out the two female Mark IVs and was then taken out by Mitchell's male Mark IV. Mitchell then attempted to attack the A7V "Siegfried," but it was too far away. Before a battle could ensue, Mitchell's tank was taken out by German artillery.

A counter-attack by two Australian brigades and a British brigade during the night of 24 April partly surrounded Villers-Bretonneux and on 25 April the town was recaptured. On 26 April, the role of the Moroccan division of the French army was crucial in pushing back German units. Australian, British and French troops had almost restored the original front line by 27 April. (Note: German units engaged: I, II and III Sturmpanzerwagen Abteilungen, 228th Division, 4th Guard Division, 77th Reserve Division, 208th Division and Guard Ersatz Division. In reserve: 19th Division, 9th Bavarian Reserve Division and the Jäger Division. Allied divisions engaged: parts of the 4th and 5th Australian divisions, parts of the 58th, 8th, 18th divisions, French 131st and Moroccan divisions.)

== Prelude ==
In late 1917 and early 1918, the end of the fighting on the Eastern Front allowed the Germans to transfer large numbers of men and equipment to the west. Buoyed by this, but concerned that the entry of the United States into the war would negate their numerical advantage if they did not attack quickly, and that massed tank attacks like that at Cambrai in November 1917 had made more areas vulnerable to attack, the German commander, Erich Ludendorff, chose to use his temporary numerical advantage to punch through the front line and advance north towards the sea. In March, the Germans launched the Spring Offensive, against the British Third and Fifth Armies on the Somme, which were understrength due to the small numbers of replacements being sent from Britain.

In unfinished defences, the Fifth Army was forced back quickly after the first two days, as the Germans advanced under a heavy bombardment of high explosives and gas. As the Germans advanced steadily west, the Third Army also fell back on its southern flank and the crucial railhead at Amiens was threatened with capture; Paris was bombarded by long-range guns. The Allies moved reinforcements to the Somme front and by the end of May, the German advance of the 1918 Battle of the Somme had been halted in front of Hamel. In preparation for a further attack, German railway construction companies were brought up and work undertaken to repair damaged railways in the captured ground.

In early April, the Germans renewed their efforts, simultaneously beginning the Battle of the Lys in Flanders. The Germans managed to advance towards Villers-Bretonneux, a town on the high ground to the south of the Somme River. The terrain allowed artillery observers to see bombardments on Amiens, which was only 16 kilometres (9.9 mi) away, which was of great tactical value. On 4 April, the Germans attempted to capture the town with 15 divisions but were repulsed by troops from the British 1st Cavalry Division and Australian 9th Brigade during the First Battle of Villers-Bretonneux with the help of the Canadians. After the first battle, the forces that had secured the town were relieved and by late April the area around Villers-Bretonneux was largely held by the 8th Division. Although it had been one of the best British divisions it had suffered badly in the German attacks of March, losing 250 officers and about 4,700 men, reducing its infantry by half. Replacements in the latest draft from Britain included 18-year-olds with little training.

== Battle ==
=== German 2nd Army attack ===
On 17/18 April, the Germans bombarded the area behind Villers-Bretonneux with mustard gas, causing 1,000 Australian casualties. On the evening of 23/24 April, an artillery barrage was fired, using mustard gas and high explosive rounds. Next morning, the Germans attacked the village with four divisions. The German infantry, with thirteen supporting A7V tanks, broke through the 8th Division, making a 3-mile (4.8 km) wide gap in the Allied line. Villers-Bretonneux fell to the Germans and the railway junction of Amiens became vulnerable to capture. After the Germans took Villers-Bretonneux, the first engagement between opposing tanks took place. Three British Mark IV tanks from No. 1 Section, A Company, 1st Battalion, Tank Corps had been dispatched to the Cachy switch line, at the first reports of German advance and were to hold it against the Germans. One was a "male" (the No. 1 Tank of the section) armed with two 6-pounder guns and machine guns, under the command of Lieutenant Frank Mitchell. It was crewed by only four of the normal crew of eight, as the others had been gassed. The other tanks were "females" armed with 0.303 in (7.7 mm) machine-guns, for use against infantry. All were advancing when they encountered a German A7V, "Nixe" of Abteilung III Imperial German Tank Force, commanded by 2nd Lieutenant Wilhelm Biltz.

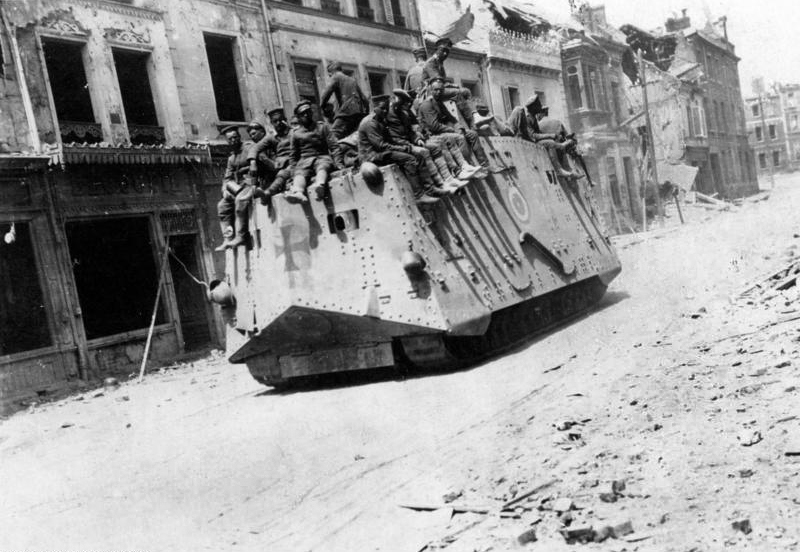
A7V tank at Roye, 21 March 1918

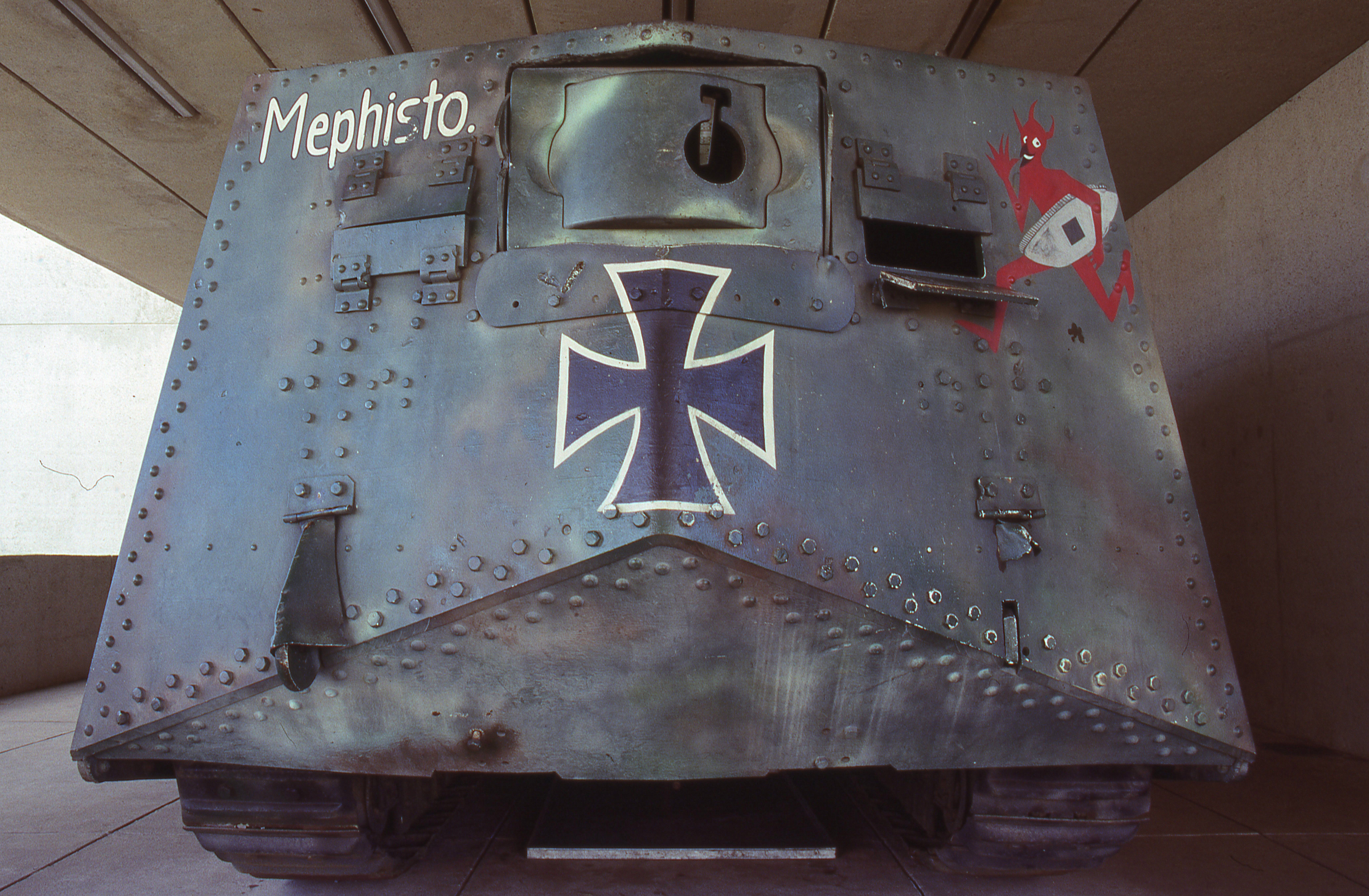
Mephisto, German tank now held in the Queensland Museum

Nixe fired on the two "females", damaging them to the extent that it left holes in the hull leaving the crew exposed. Both retreated; their machine guns were unable to penetrate the armour on the German tank. Mitchell's "male" Mark IV continued to fire at the A7V, while on the move to avoid German artillery fire and the gun of the German tank. The movement meant Mitchell's gunner had difficulty in aiming the 6-pounders. The tanks fired at each other on the move, until the Mark IV stopped to allow the gunner a clear shot and the gunner scored three hits (a total of six shell hits). Nixe heeled over on its side, possibly as a result of crossing an incline at the wrong angle. The surviving German crew (out of 18 men), including Biltz, alighted from the vehicle and the British fired at them as they fled on foot, killing nine.

The British tank was next faced by two more A7Vs, supported by infantry; Mitchell's tank fired several ranging shots at the German tanks and they retreated. Mitchell's tank continued to attack the German infantry, firing case-shot. Seven of the new British Whippet medium tanks arrived, attacked the Germans, encountered some battalions "forming up in the open" and killed many infantry with their machine-guns and by running them down. Mitchell later remarked that when they returned their tracks were covered with blood. Only four of the seven Whippets came back, the rest were destroyed by artillery and five crew were killed.

Being the last tank on the field and slow moving, the Mark IV became a target for German artillery and Mitchell ordered the tank back, manoeuvring to try to avoid the shells but a mortar round disabled the tracks. The crew left the tank, escaping to a British-held trench, much to the surprise of the troops in it. Leutnant Biltz and his crew re-boarded "Nixe" and attempted to return to their base, but had to abandon the vehicle again when the engines failed. Attempts by the Germans to recover it were unsuccessful, and it was blown up by a demolition crew during the night of April 23–24. Earlier in the day, another A7V, No 506 "Mephisto", became ditched in a crater and was abandoned by its crew. It was recovered by British and Australian troops some three months later, and is now held at the Queensland Museum. (Note: Mephisto was later recovered by troops from the Australian 26th Battalion and the British 1st Gun Carrier Company; after the war the tank was taken back to Australia as a souvenir. It is the only surviving German World War I tank and is preserved at the Queensland Museum in Brisbane, Australia.)

=== Fourth Army counter-attack ===
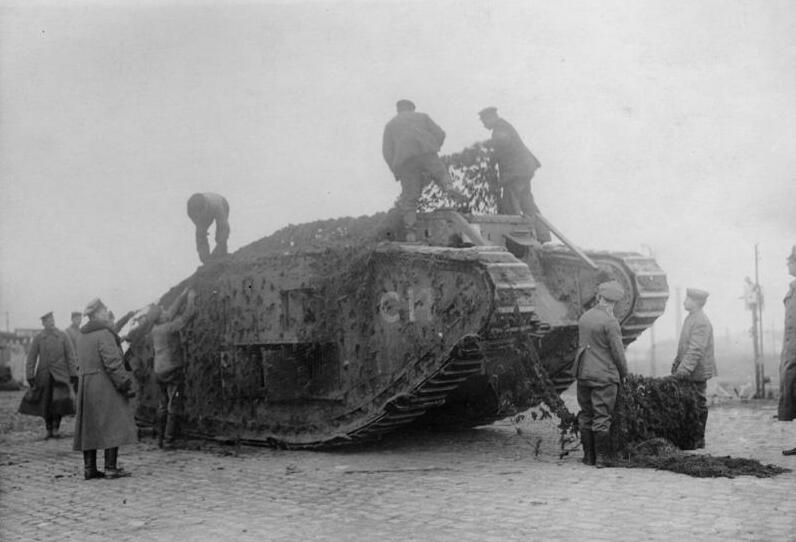
A captured "female" Mark IV tank C14 in 1917

About noon the 1st Battalion of the Sherwood Foresters had attempted a counter-attack. The British 25th Brigade was considered for an attack but this was cancelled. A tank with troops from the 2nd Royal Berkshire Regiment made a spontaneous attack from the north, pushing the German line back about 150 yards (140 m). General Henry Rawlinson had responded even before he received orders from Marshal Ferdinand Foch to recapture the town. At 9:30 a.m. he ordered an immediate counter-attack by the Australian 13th Brigade under Brigadier General Thomas William Glasgow and the 15th Brigade under Brigadier General Harold "Pompey" Elliott, both in reserve, though the 13th Brigade had suffered many casualties at Dernancourt nearby. Rawlinson intended an enveloping attack, the 15th Brigade attacking north of the town and the 13th Brigade attacking to the south. British troops would support and the 2nd Battalion, Northamptonshire Regiment and the 22nd Durham Light Infantry would follow through in the gap between the Australians and "mop up" the town, once it was isolated. Artillery support was available but since German positions were unknown and to avoid alerting the Germans, there was no preparatory barrage to soften up the German positions. Instead the artillery would bombard the town for the hour once the attack began and then move its line of fire back beyond the line held by the Allies before the German attack.

Meanwhile, the 14th Brigade held its positions to the north, and provided guides to the 15th Brigade. The attack took place on the night of 24/25 April, after a postponement from 8:00 p.m. Glasgow argued that it would still be light, with terrible consequences for his men and that the operation should start at 10:00 p.m. and "zero hour" was eventually set for 10:00 p.m. The operation began with German machine gun crews causing many Australian casualties. A number of charges against machine-gun posts helped the Australian advance; in particular, Lieutenant Clifford Sadlier of the 51st Battalion, was awarded the Victoria Cross, after attacking with hand-grenades. The two brigades swept around Villers-Bretonneux and the Germans retreated, for a while escaping the pocket along a railway cutting. The Australians eventually captured the German positions and pushed the German line back, leaving the German troops in Villers-Bretonneux surrounded. The British units attacked frontally and suffered many casualties. By 25 April, the town had been recaptured and handed back to the villagers. The battle was a great success for the Allies, who had defeated the German attempt to capture Amiens and recaptured Villers-Bretonneux while outnumbered; the village remained in Allied hands to the end of the war.

== Role of the Moroccan Division ==
According to Romain Fathi, in New Directions in War and History, the role of the Moroccan Division at the Second Battle of Villers-Bretonneux has been neglected by Australian popular historians. On 26 April, the French Moroccan Division attacked south of the town and rescued the Australian 51st and 52nd Battalions.

The personal diaries of journalist Charles Bean and a later account of the battle by the commanding officer of the 52nd Battalion, Lt. Colonel J. L. Whitham describe myriad problems arising from this being the first time the Australians and French had fought together on the Western Front. In particular, with the way each defended newly occupied ground and in the manner that the French expected to undertake relief of the Australian line.

While costly, the attack of the Moroccan division was a success, pushing the line further east than Australian troops had due to the strong German resistance they had encountered. The Moroccan Division's contribution to Second Villers-Bretonneux was crucial to the success of the whole operation. For its engagement, the 8e régiment de marche de zouaves of the Moroccan division was awarded a Légion d’honneur by the French President with the following citation: "The year 1918 finds them ready, once again, for all acts of boldness and all sacrifices. On 26 April they attacked Villers-Bretonneux and blocked the road to Amiens".

== Aftermath ==
=== Analysis ===
Fighting continued in Villers-Bretonneux and the vicinity for months after the counter-attack. The Australians spent Anzac Day in hand-to-hand fighting and the town was not secured until 27 April with the contribution of the French Moroccan Division. On 3 May an attack by the Australian 12th Brigade towards Monument Wood south-east of Villers-Bretonneux failed, with the 48th Battalion losing over 150 men. The German offensive in the Australian sector ended in late April. As the Germans turned their attention to the French sectors in May and June, a lull occurred on the Somme, during which the Australians exploited their success at Villers-Bretonneux by conducting "peaceful penetration" operations, that slowly advanced the front eastwards.

French historian Romain Fathi has written that "In the case of Villers-Bretonneux for example, Australian accounts have significantly over-estimated the significance of the town for they have failed to consider the much fiercer German push at Moreuil and Bois Sénécat, a few kilometres further south. Broadening the front under consideration, from Albert to Montdidier and looking at the German push therein, would relativise the strategic importance of Villers-Bretonneux".

As the German offensive ended on the Marne in early July, more fighting took place around Villers-Bretonneux, as part of diversionary moves by the Australians in support of the Battle of Hamel. Corporal Walter Brown, of the 20th Battalion, received the Victoria Cross for his actions. Later in the month, the 25th Battalion and 26th Battalion of the 7th Brigade attacked around Monument Wood; for his actions during the assault and German counter-attack, Lieutenant Albert Borella of the 26th Battalion received the Victoria Cross. After the Anzac Day counter-attack, British and French commanders lavished praise upon the Australians, who were all volunteers. Brigadier-General George Grogan, a witness, later wrote that it was "perhaps the greatest individual feat of the war" for troops to attack at night, across unfamiliar ground, at short notice and with no artillery preparation.

These factors had proved essential to the Australian success. Foch spoke of their "astonishing valiance [sic]..." and General Sir Henry Rawlinson attributed the safety of Amiens to the "...determination, tenacity and valour of the Australian Corps". After the battle, the worst examples of looting by AIF soldiers of the war occurred. In 2011, King wrote that one culprit was Barney Hines, the "Souvenir King" of the AIF, who was something of a celebrity. According to King, Hines raided a number of houses, looting alcohol and expensive clothes, with which he threw a party for his friends that ended abruptly when the Germans shelled the house, wounding Hines and several others. King wrote that the Australians shared rations with French civilians in the town. Due to the coincidence of the day in which the counter-attack occurred, the battle holds a significant place in Australian military history, nevertheless it was a combined Allied effort.

=== Casualties ===
The fighting around Villers-Bretonneux in April resulted in the following Allied casualties: the Australian brigades had taken 2,473 casualties, British casualties were 9,529 and French losses were c. 3,500. German losses were 8,000–10,400 men.

== Memorial ==
In the 1930s a memorial was established at the top of the Villers-Bretonneux Military Cemetery to honour the Australian soldiers who fell in France in the Great War. The cemetery is located between Villers-Bretonneux and Fouilloy on the hill (belonging to the latter but overlooking the former) from which the famous night attack was launched. Some 10 miles (16 km) east of Amiens and north of the Roman road to St-Quentin, it rises gently to a plateau overlooking Amiens, the Somme valley and the town. The cemetery contains 2,000 graves, of which 779 are Australian. A further ten Australian casualties of the battle are buried in the Villers-Bretonneux Communal Cemetery. The smaller Crucifix Corner British Military Cemetery just east of the town, in the shadow of a motorway embankment, contains the graves of Australian, British and French metropolitan and colonial (Moroccan) troops, the former including many Australians who fell in the area in fighting, which moved further to the east only on 8 August 1918 (but from then on rapidly). The victory gained at Villers-Bretonneux on the third anniversary of the Gallipoli landings is yearly commemorated by Australians. In 2008, to mark the ninetieth anniversary, the Australian and New Zealand Anzac Day dawn service was held for the first time on the Fouilloy Hill, as well as the traditional one held on the Gallipoli Peninsula.
