= A7V =

German World War I heavy tank

Sturmpanzerwagen A7V
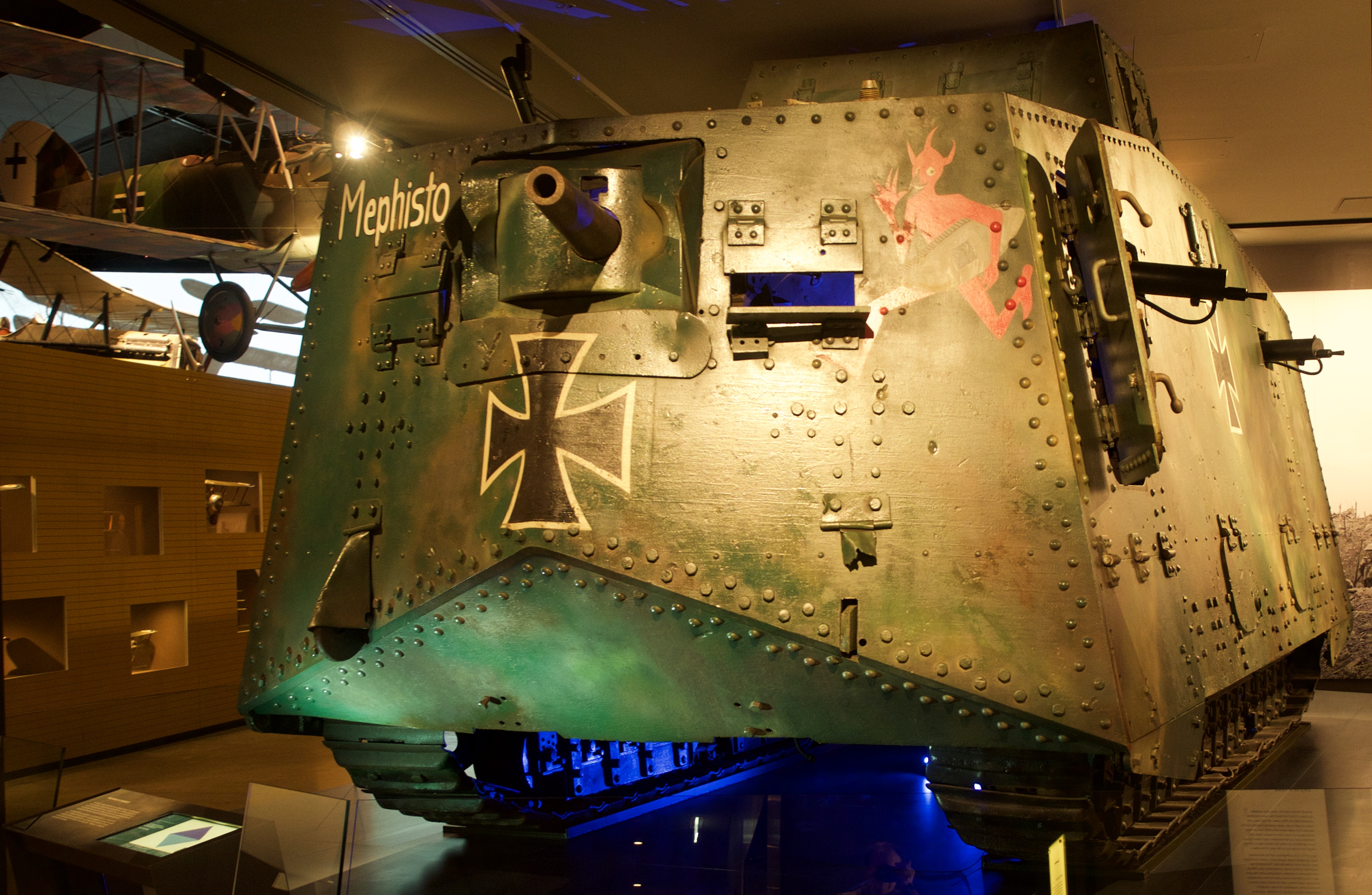
- Sole surviving A7V ("Mephisto") on display at the Australian War Memorial in Canberra.
- Type: Heavy tank
- Place of origin: German Empire

Service history
- In service: 21 March 1918 – 16 October 1918
- Used by: German Empire
- Wars: World War I German Revolution

Production history
- Designer: Joseph Vollmer
- Designed: 1916
- Manufacturer: Daimler Motoren Gesellschaft
- No. built: 20

Specifications
- Mass: 31.5 t (31.0 long tons; 34.7 short tons) battle weight
- Length: 7.34 m (24 ft 1 in)
- Width: 3.1 m (10 ft 2 in)
- Height: 3.3 m (10 ft 10 in)
- Crew: 18 (minimum), up to 25
- Armor: 5 to 30 mm (0.20 to 1.18 in)
- Main armament: 5.7 cm Maxim-Nordenfelt (initially with 180 rounds; later 300)
- Secondary armament: 6 × 7.9 mm machine guns 36,000 rounds
- Engine: 2 × Daimler-Mercedes 4-cylinder 200 hp (149 kW) total
- Power/weight: 6.5 hp/tonne
- Transmission: Adler gearboxes and differentials
- Suspension: Holt track, vertical springs
- Operational range: 30–80 km (19–50 mi)
- Maximum speed: 15 km/h (9.3 mph) on roads 6.4 km/h (4.0 mph) cross-country

The Sturmpanzerwagen A7V was a heavy tank introduced by Germany in 1918 during World War I. One hundred chassis were ordered in early 1917, ten to be finished as fighting vehicles with armoured bodies, and the remainder as Überlandwagen cargo carriers. The number to be armoured was later increased to 20. They were used in action from March to October 1918, and were the only tanks produced by Germany in World War I to be used in combat, as well as being the first operational German tank. Although various German armoured vehicle proposals were shown a modest amount of support early in the war, enthusiasm among German high command was low and they were given little funding and attention. The sudden appearance of the British Mark series of tanks causing panic amongst the German infantry led this to be reconsidered however, and development on the German tank program began.

== History ==
After the first British tanks appeared on the Western Front, in September 1916, the German War Ministry formed a committee, under the auspices of its Allgemeines Kriegsdepartement, Abteilung 7 Verkehrswesen ("General War Department, Section 7, Transportation"), to investigate tank development.

The project to design and build the first German tank was placed under the direction of Joseph Vollmer, one of Germany's foremost automobile designers. It was to weigh around 30 tons, be capable of crossing ditches up to 1.5 metres (4.9 ft) wide, have armament including a cannon at the front and rear as well as several machine-guns, and reach a top speed of at least 12 kilometres per hour (7.5 mph). The running gear was based on the American Holt tractor, copied from examples loaned by the Austro-Hungarian Army. After initial plans were shared with the army in December 1916, the design was extended to be a universal chassis that could be used as a base for both a tank and unarmoured Überlandwagen ("over-land vehicle") cargo carriers.

The first prototype was completed by Daimler-Motoren-Gesellschaft at Berlin-Marienfelde and tested on 30 April 1917. A wooden mockup of a final version was completed in May 1917 and demonstrated in Mainz with 10 tons of ballast to simulate the weight of the armor. During final design, the rear-facing cannon was removed and the number of machine-guns was increased to six. The first pre-production A7V was produced in September 1917, followed by the first production model in October 1917. The tanks were given to Assault Tank Units 1 and 2, founded on 20 September 1917, each with five officers and 109 non-commissioned officers and soldiers.

=== Naming ===
The tank's name was derived from that of its parent organization, Allgemeines Kriegsdepartement, Abteilung 7 (Verkehrswesen) (General War Department, Section 7, Transport). In German, the tank was called Sturmpanzerwagen (roughly "armoured assault vehicle").

== Design ==
Artist's recreation of an A7V.

The A7V was 7.34 m (24 ft 1 in) long and 3 m (9 ft 10 in) wide, and the maximum height was 3.3 m (10 ft 10 in). The tank had 15 mm strong armoured plates at the sides, 30 mm at the front and 10 mm for the roof; the steel was a hardened steel with a brinell hardness between 400 and 440.

The crew officially consisted of at least 17 soldiers and one officer: commander (officer, typically a lieutenant), driver, mechanic, mechanic/signaller, 12 infantrymen (six machine gunners, six loaders), and two artillerymen (main gunner and loader). A7Vs often went into action with as many as 25 men on board.

== Armament ==
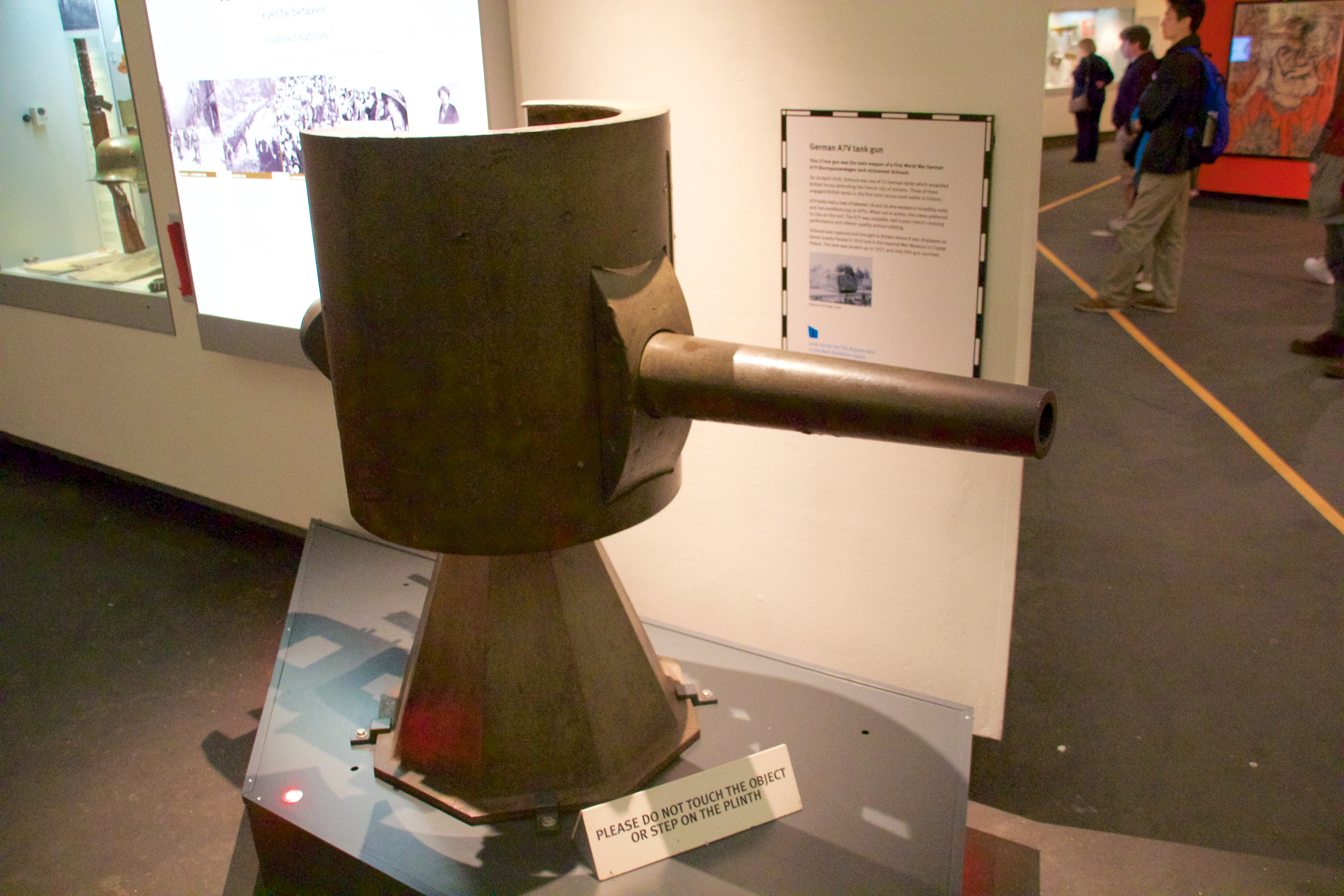
5.7-cm Maxim-Nordenfelt gun from A7V "Schnuck", at the Imperial War Museum, Manchester, UK

The A7V was armed with six 7.92 mm MG08 machine guns and a 5.7 cm Maxim-Nordenfelt cannon mounted at the front. Some of these cannons were of British manufacture and had been captured in Belgium early in the war; others were captured in Russia in 1918 and appear to have included some Russian-made copies.

Some A7Vs originally were built with two forward-facing machine guns instead of a 57 mm gun. Most were converted to carry a 57 mm before entering service. Number 501, Gretchen, took part in the action at St. Quentin before her 57 mm was fitted.

=== Ammunition ===
The A7V carried between 40 and 60 cartridge belts for its machine guns, each of 250 rounds, giving it a total of 10,000 to 15,000 rounds. Officially, it carried 180 shells for the 57 mm gun, of which 90 were canister, 54 were armor-piercing, and 36 were high-explosive; in practice, however, A7V crews stowed up to 300 57 mm rounds for combat.

== Propulsion ==
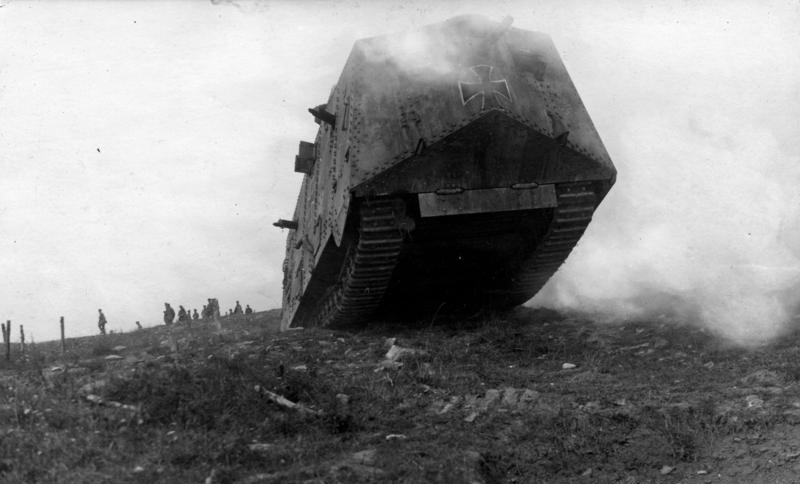
In rough terrain

Power came from two centrally mounted Daimler 4-cylinder petrol engines delivering 75 kW (101 hp) each; the A7V carried 500 litres (110 imp gal; 130 US gal) of fuel. The top speed was about 15 km/h (9.3 mph) on roads and 5 km/h (3.1 mph) across country. The A7V's power-to-weight ratio was 5.1 kW/ton (6.8 hp/ton), it could cross trenches up to 2.1 m (6 ft 11 in) wide, and its ground clearance was 190 to 400 mm (7.5 to 15.7 in).

Compared to that of other World War I tanks, the A7V's road speed was quite high, but the vehicle had very poor off-road capability and a high centre of gravity, which made it prone to getting stuck or overturning on steep slopes. The large overhang at the front and the low ground clearance meant that trenches or very muddy areas were impassable. The driver's view of the terrain directly in front of the tank was obscured by the vehicle's hull, which meant that there was a blind spot of about 10 metres (33 ft). However, in open terrain, the A7V could be used to some success, and offered more firepower than the armoured cars that were available.

The full 60 road wheel suspension (both tracks combined) consisted of six bogies in total, each sprung by two or four square section coil springs. Each bogie held five axles, each axle held two road wheels, for a total of ten road wheels per bogie. The road wheels featured flanges that interleaved, though to a limited extent. (Some sources incorrectly count 30 or even 24 road wheels.)

== Combat history ==
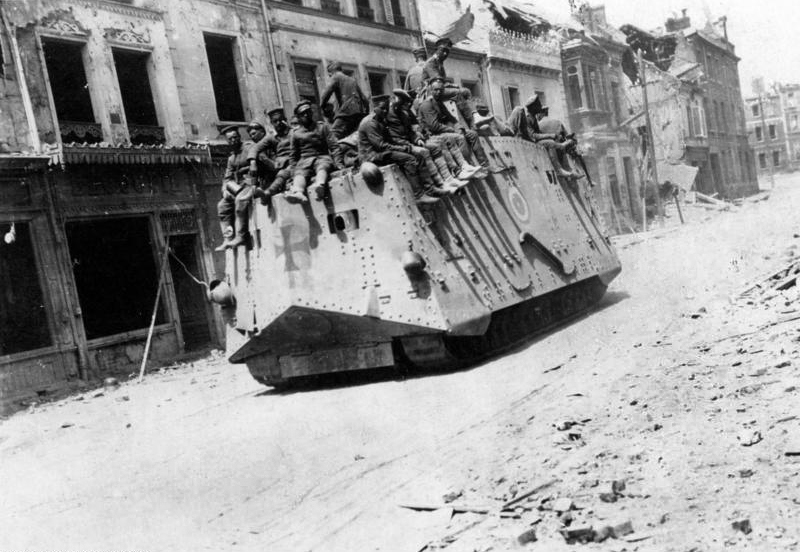
A7V tank at Roye in France on 21 March 1918

=== St. Quentin Canal ===
The A7V was first used in combat on 21 March 1918. Five tanks of Abteilung I (Detachment I), numbered, 501, 502, 505, 506 and 507, under the command of Hauptmann Greiff were deployed north of the St. Quentin Canal. Three of the A7Vs, 502, 505 and 506, suffered mechanical failures before they entered combat while the remaining pair helped stop a minor British breakthrough in the area, but otherwise saw little combat that day. One of these vehicles 506, would go on to become the only surviving original A7V after it was renamed Mephisto and captured by the 26th Queensland battalion later in 1918.

=== Villers-Bretonneux ===
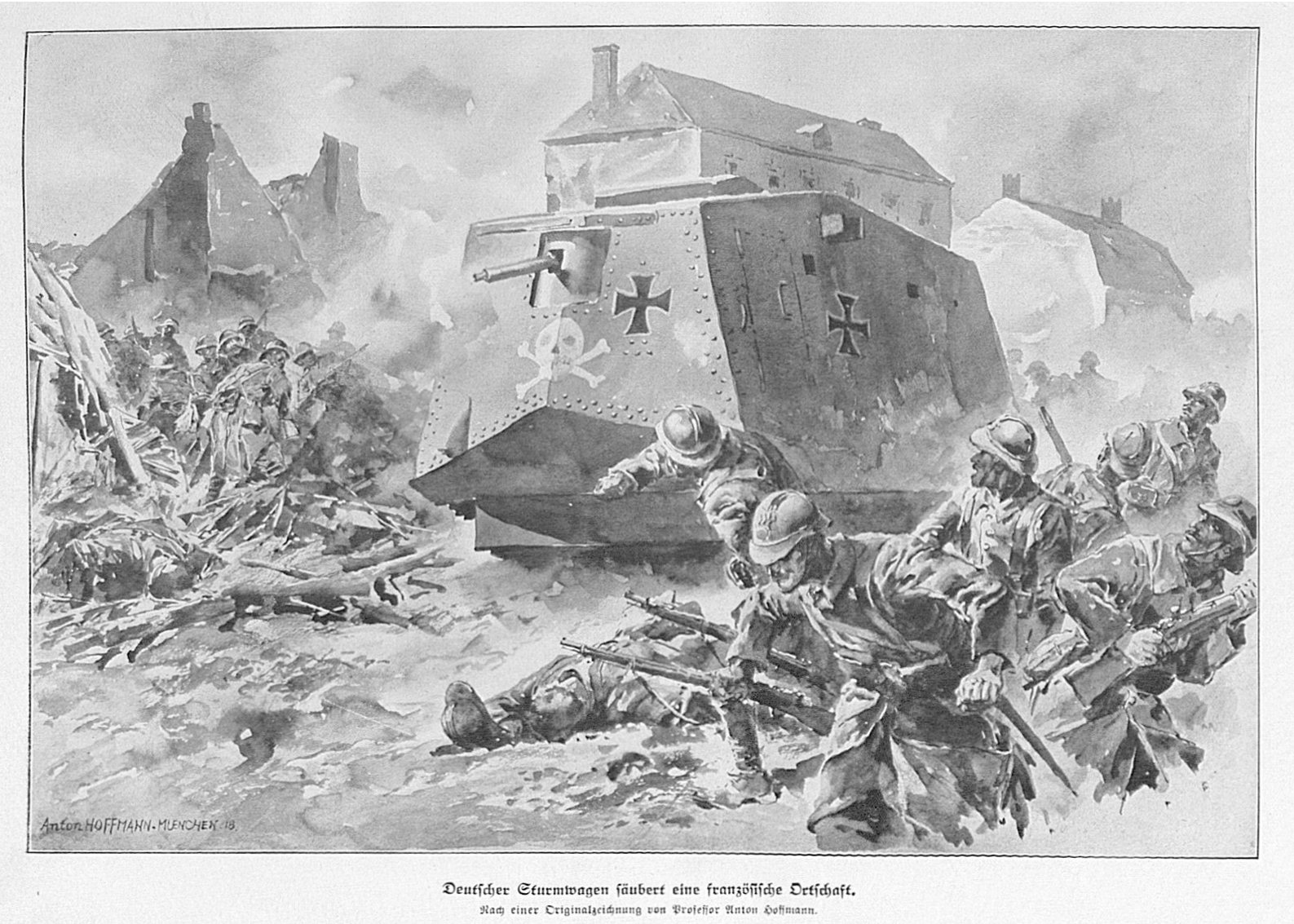
"A German Sturmwagen 'cleans out' a French village. Based on an original drawing by Professor Anton Hoffmann."

==== Overview ====
The first full employment of A7V was an attack in the area of Villers-Bretonneux in April 1918. Four German infantry divisions had the task to storm the British lines and take the town, therefore all three detachments (Abteilungen) of A7V had been allocated to these divisions. The offensive operation spread over a 6.4-kilometre (4 mi) front. The detachments were transported from the Cambrai tank workshop to the front, but of originally 15 tanks, only 13 reached the starting position. The German High Command ordered that they had to follow the infantry attack and destroy resistance, when the assault of the infantry is stopped. After the battle the British recorded that their lines were broken by the tanks.

==== First Tank Battles of History ====
According to a participant of the battle, Second Lieutenant Frank Mitchell, who was one of the commanders of the tank crews of three British Mark IVs (two female machine gun-armed tanks and one male with two 6-pounder guns) which were send out to support own forces north of Villers-Bretonneux, their tanks encountered a German A7V tank (chassis number 561, known as Nixe) and two further German tanks. He wrote that during the battle, tanks on both sides were damaged. While he had a "Male" tank able to fight back, the two British "Female" Mk IV retreated, as they were not able to damage an enemy tank with their machine guns.

Mitchell then attacked the German tank nearest to him, commanded by Second Lieutenant Wilhelm Biltz, with the 6-pounders of his own tank and knocked it out. He hit it three times, and killed five of the crew when they bailed out. He stated that he then went on to rout some infantry with case shot. According to his memories two remaining A7Vs turned and withdrew.

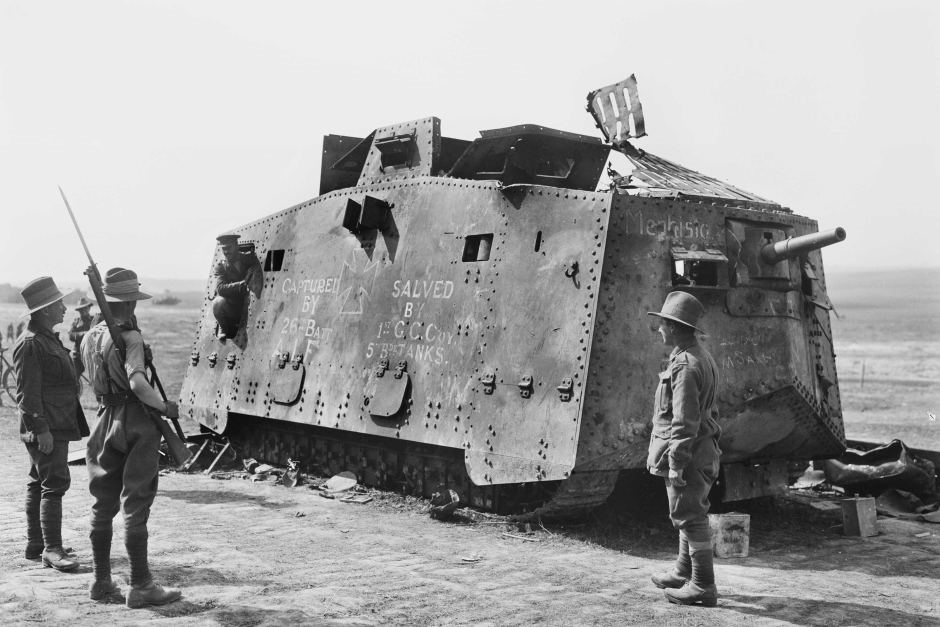
A7V tank (Mephisto) after recovery from the battlefield.

After examining several reports from all available sources the museum director of the German Panzer Museum Munster, Ralph Raths, in 2026 came to different conclusion. The German tanks had received an order to operate in pairs. Tank 561 "Nixe", lost his escort tank early that day, before it reached a position northeast of Villers-Bretonneux, where it was fighting infantry, when the three British tanks showed up. No other tank was close to it. The next German tanks were "Siegfried" and "Schnuck" operating a bit further south in an attack on the village Cachy. Facing a tank with a gun the "Female" tanks retreated directly without any chance of winning a duel for them, but one received hits from "Nixe" according the available battle records. Mitchell's tank attacked "Nixe" with one of its guns and succeed in placing a direct hit. The engagement finally ended with a damaged and immobilized German tank.

The German defence targeted Mitchell's tank, which thereupon lost a track due to damage from an exploding mortar shell and was abandoned, while it was moving forward (according Mitchell with the intention of attacking the two tanks south of Villers-Bretonneux). Prior to this, the heavy damaged A7V "Nixe" limped back to the German lines, but broke down not far behind the line. It was later destroyed by a German demolition squad, to prevent its capture and reuse by the Allies.

During the same day however, another tank-against-tank fight took place when an A7V ("Siegfried") directly south of the first duel, engaged a group of Whippet tanks and destroyed one of them. The Whippets had been developed as cavalry tanks to be used in a breakthrough in enemy lines without the idea of a tank battle at all, and were armed only with machine guns. "Siegfried" used its 57-mm-gun and knocked out three of these relatively new tanks, while the rest managed to demoralize two German infantry battalions they caught in the open to the rear causing them to break and flee. These new tank models had been reported in German after battle reports as French tanks, as they had nothing in common with the British rhomboid tanks.

A counterattack later re-established the Allied line, by which time three A7Vs were out of action in No Man's Land or behind German lines. Nixe was badly damaged, and a German team destroyed it with explosive charges during the night of the 24th. Elfriede had overturned; it was righted and recovered from No Man's Land three weeks later by French troops and British tanks, and handed over to the French for examination. Mephisto lay stuck in a crater behind German lines for almost three months. After the area was taken by Australian troops, in July, the tank was towed to the rear by British tanks and, eventually, transported to Australia.

=== Other actions ===
In May, A7Vs were used with limited success in an attack on the French near Soissons, during the Third Battle of the Aisne.

On 15 July, at Reims (during the Second Battle of the Marne), the Germans put eight A7Vs and 20 captured Mk IVs against the French lines. Although 10 of the Mk IVs were lost in this action, no A7Vs were lost.

The final use in World War I of A7Vs was in a small but successful action on 11 October 1918, near Iwuy.

=== Assessment ===
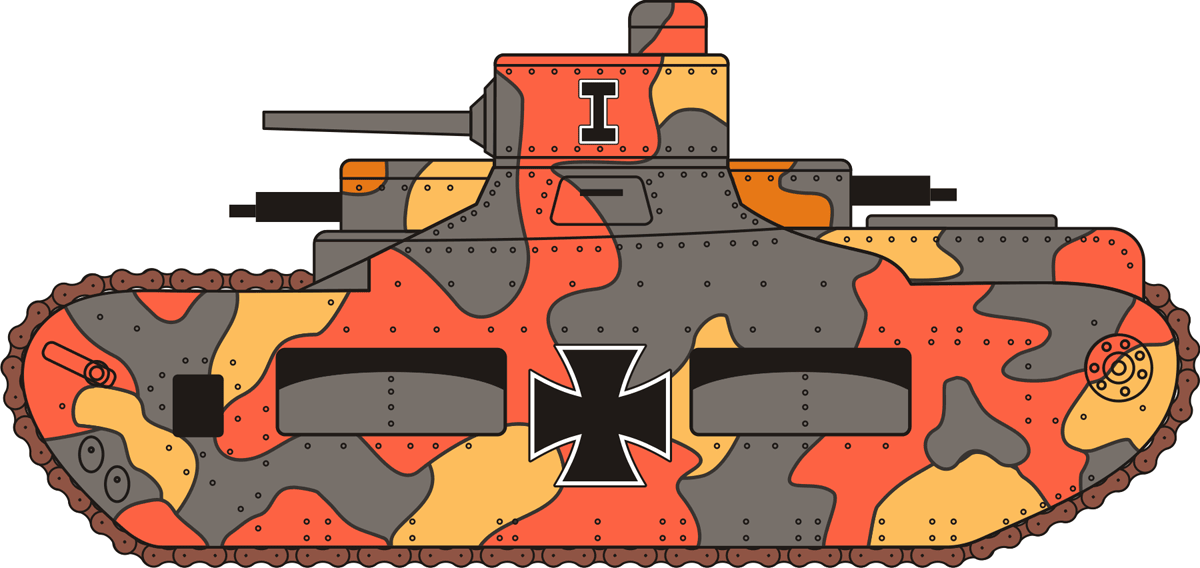
Drawing of a proposed Sturmpanzerwagen Oberschlesien

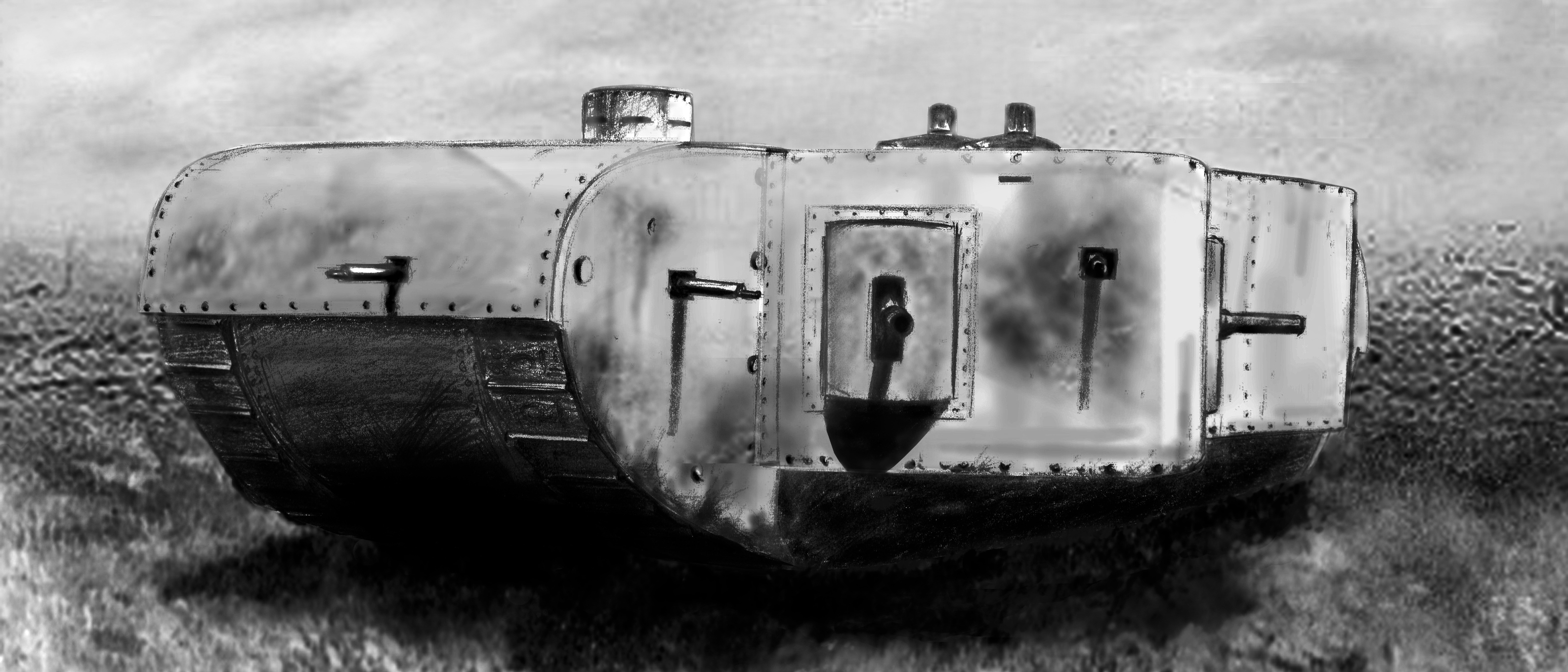
Drawing of a proposed K-Wagen

Germany did not consider the A7V a success and planned other designs. However, the end of the war meant none of the other tanks in development or planned ones – such as the Sturmpanzerwagen Oberschlesien and the 120-ton K-Wagen – would be finished.

With only 20 produced, the A7V made only a very minor contribution to the German war effort in World War I, and the approximately 50 captured British Mark IV tanks (renamed Beutepanzer in German operation) the Germans fielded in action during the war outnumbered the A7V. In contrast, the French produced over 3,600 of their light Renault FT, the most numerous tank of World War I, and the British over 2,500 of their Mark I, II, III, IV, V, and V* heavy tanks.

== After the war ==
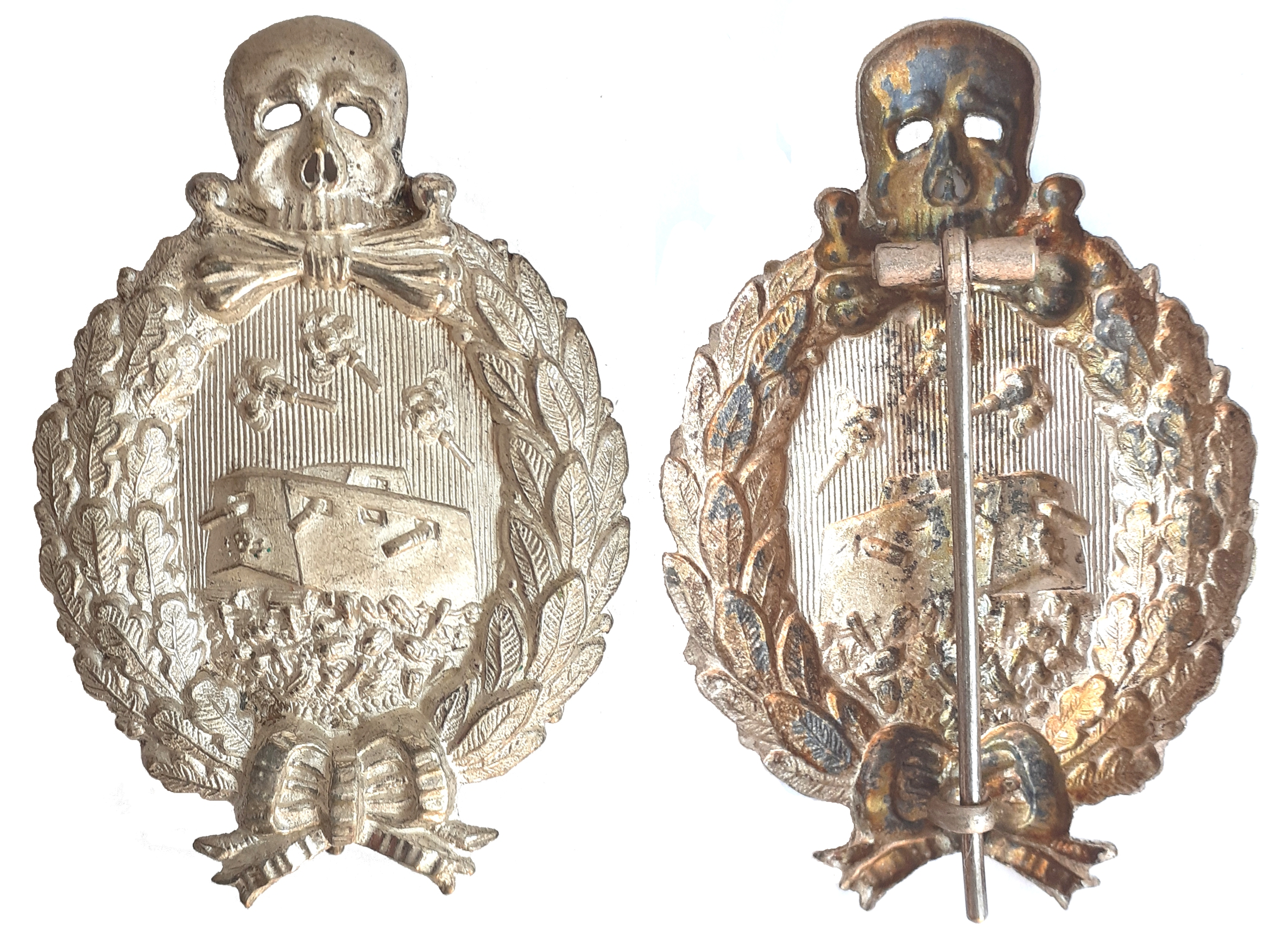
1921 Tank Memorial Badge

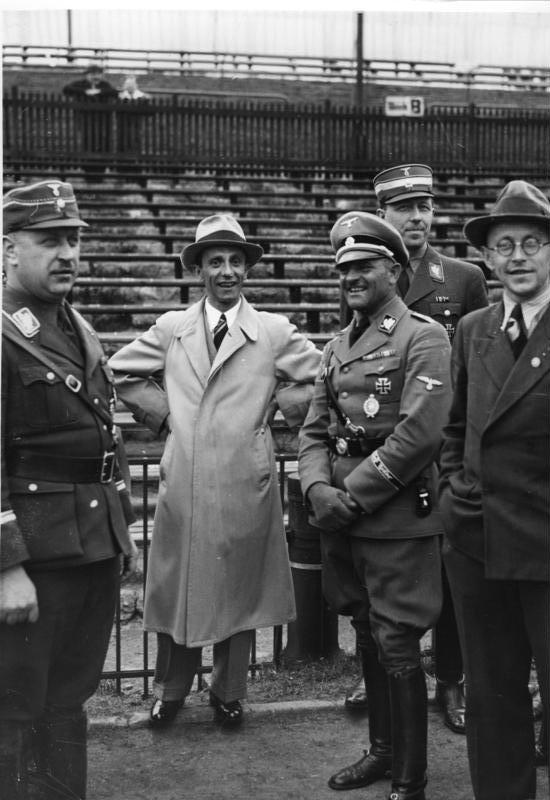
SS-Obergruppenführer Josef "Sepp" Dietrich, third from right, wearing the 1921 Tank Memorial Badge. Josef Goebbels is second from left.

Two vehicles closely resembling the A7V, one of which was named Hedi, were among several used by Kokampf, a Freikorps tank unit, to quell civil unrest in Berlin in 1919. They were constructed using the chassis from Überlandwagen and armed with four MG08/15 machine guns. It is not known whether the vehicles were armour-plated.

There is a popular myth that France handed over several A7Vs to Polish forces, which used them during the Polish–Soviet War in 1919–1920. However, reliable sources dismiss the idea because the fate of each A7V that saw service in World War I is known and includes no transfers to Poland and there is no known official record or photographic evidence of A7Vs in Polish service.

The design of the A7V is featured on the 1921 Tank Memorial Badge, awarded to German veterans of World War I who served as tank crewmen.

== Chassis listing ==
Chassis number	Tank name(s)	Image (If available)	Notes & Fate
501	Gretchen		Armed only with machine guns until fitted with a 57 mm cannon in late 1918. Abandoned at Sainte-Cécile (Belgium), believed scrapped practically in situ by the Allies in 1919.
502/503	Faust, Kronprinz Wilhelm, Wilhelm, Heiland Possibly named König Wilhelm at one point.	Faust 502/503 in background	502 became a Geländewagen ("cross-country vehicle"), and was not fitted with armour. After a defect of chassis 502 in March 1918, its structure was set to chassis 503 (503 suffered a cylinder head crack in April 1918). Gifted in October 1918 and taken by the British who scrapped it locally.
504/544	Schnuck		After a defect of chassis 544, its structure was set to chassis 504. Damaged by friendly fire at Fremicourt on 31 August 1918 it was abandoned by crew, and captured by troops of the New Zealand Division three days later. Displayed in London on Horse Guards Parade 1918/19 and given to the Imperial War Museum in 1919 but disposed of in 1922 with only the main gun kept.
505	Baden I, Prinz August Wilhelm, August Wilhelm		Scrapped by the Allies in 1919
506	Mephisto		The only surviving A7V. Ditched and abandoned at Villers-Bretonneux on 24 April 1918; it was recovered by British and Australian troops in July. Taken via London to Brisbane, Australia in 1919, it is now on permanent display at Queensland Museum.
507	Cyklop, Prinz Eitel Friedrich, Eitel Friedrich, Imperator		Briefly in hands of Freikorps at Lankwitz after the Armistice. Scrapped in 1919.
525	Siegfried		Scrapped by the Allies in 1919.
526	Possibly named Alter Fritz		Cannibalized Scrapped by Germans, 1 June 1918.
527	Lotti		Struck by artillery at Fort de la Pompelle, Reims and abandoned by crew on 1 June 1918.
528	Hagen		Ditched and abandoned by its crew at Fremicourt on 31 August 1918; captured by New Zealand troops and displayed on Horse Guards Parade; scrapped in 1919.
529	Nixe II		Disabled by French artillery at Reims on 31 May 1918; recovered by French and handed over to US Army. Displayed at Aberdeen Proving Grounds Museum, USA; scrapped in 1942.
540	Heiland		End of the war with troupe Scrapped by the Allies in 1919.
541		541 3rd fromleft	End of the war with troupe Scrapped by the Allies in 1919.
542	Elfriede		Overturned and was abandoned at Villers-Bretonneux, 24 April 1918. Recovered from no man's land by British tanks on 15 May and handed over to French forces. Photographed at Saleux 26 May 1918. Displayed at Place de la Concorde in Paris in late 1918.
543	Bulle, Prinz Adalbert, Adalbert		Tank was renamed twice, first around April/May 1918 and again in late May 1918.Scrapped by the Allies in 1919.
560	Alter Fritz	Leutnant Ernst Volckheim fifth from left	Lost at Iwuy, 11 October 1918.
561	Nixe		Disabled, destroyed on battlefield by Germans on 24 April 1918.
562	Herkules	Picture of "562"	Looted and then cannibalized by the British.
563	Wotan	Picture of "563" at Replica of "Wotan"	Scrapped by the Allies in 1919; a replica of Wotan A7V was built in the late 1980s, based largely on Mephisto
564	Prinz Oskar, Oskar	Prinz Oskar in foreground	End of the war with troupe Scrapped by the Allies in 1919.

== Variants ==
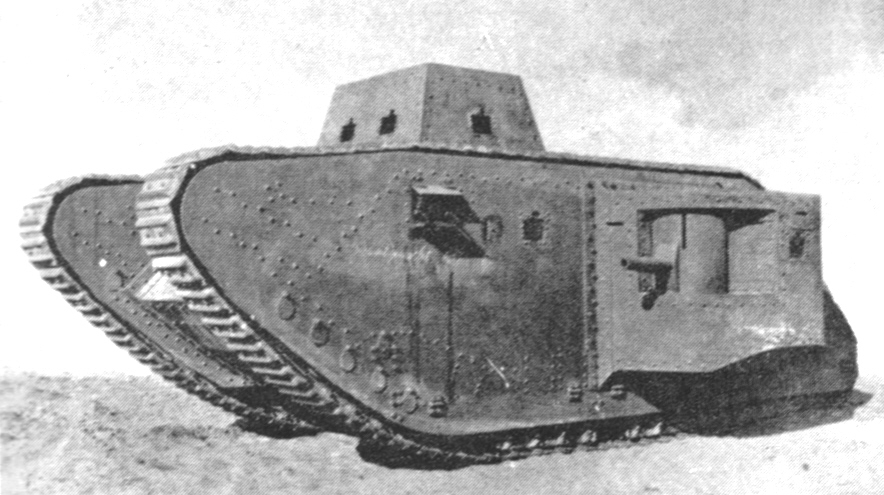
The A7V-U

- A7V-U: (umlaufende Ketten = "tracks running all the way round"). An attempt to reproduce the all-terrain capability of the British tanks, the A7V-U was still based on the Holt chassis but had a rhomboidal hull and all-round tracks. The cab was similar to, but bigger than, that on the A7V and was mounted on top of the forward part of the hull. Two 57 mm guns were carried in sponsons similar to the British type. The prototype was built in June 1918; trials showed that it was nose-heavy and had a high centre of gravity, and the 40-ton weight caused manoeuvrability problems. On the assumption that the problems could be rectified, 20 were ordered in September 1918, the same month work on the design was halted.

Drawings for two improved designs were prepared, but the war ended before any were produced.

Thirty chassis were assigned for completion as Überlandwagen supply carriers, but not all were completed before the end of the war.

- A7V Flakpanzer: Its engine was placed under the driver's compartment, which had a tarpaulin holder to cover the driver from bad weather, ammo boxes were placed around the driver's compartment and beneath the gun themselves. It is claimed that it was armed with two Russian 76 mm divisional gun M1902 field guns on the first two prototypes of the A7V Flakpanzer. The third prototype of the A7V Flakpanzer was armed with a Krupp-Manufactured 7.7 cm (3.03 in) leichte Feld Kanone 1896 n/a, only one l.F.K 1896 was mounted onto the vehicle. No paperwork related or mentioning these weapons has been found.

== Surviving example ==
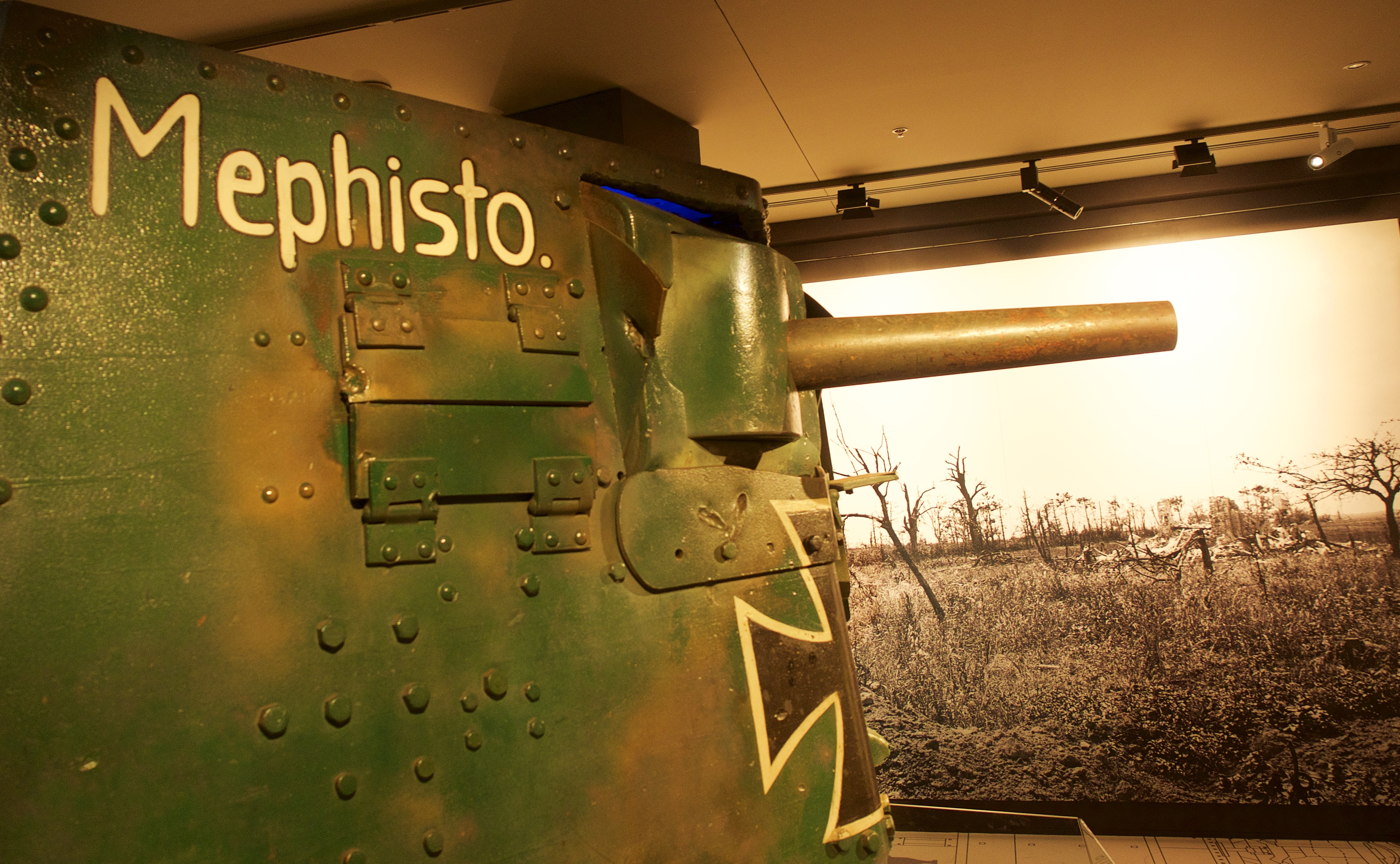
Front armour and main gun of German A7V tank "Mephisto".

The only surviving A7V is Mephisto, which was abandoned by its crew during the Battle of Villers-Bretonneux in April 1918. It was recovered three months later by British and Australian troops, and taken to Australia in 1919 as a trophy. The vehicle stood outside the old Queensland Museum in Bowen Hills, Brisbane, under an open-sided shelter for many years until being moved into the new Queensland Museum on Southbank in 1986. It was damaged by floodwater in 2011, and taken for restoration to the Workshops Rail Museum, North Ipswich, Queensland. After restoration it was displayed at the Australian War Memorial, Canberra, from 2015 until 2017. It has now been returned to the Queensland Museum.

The cannon from A7V 504 Schnuck is on display at the Imperial War Museum North in Manchester.

== Replicas ==
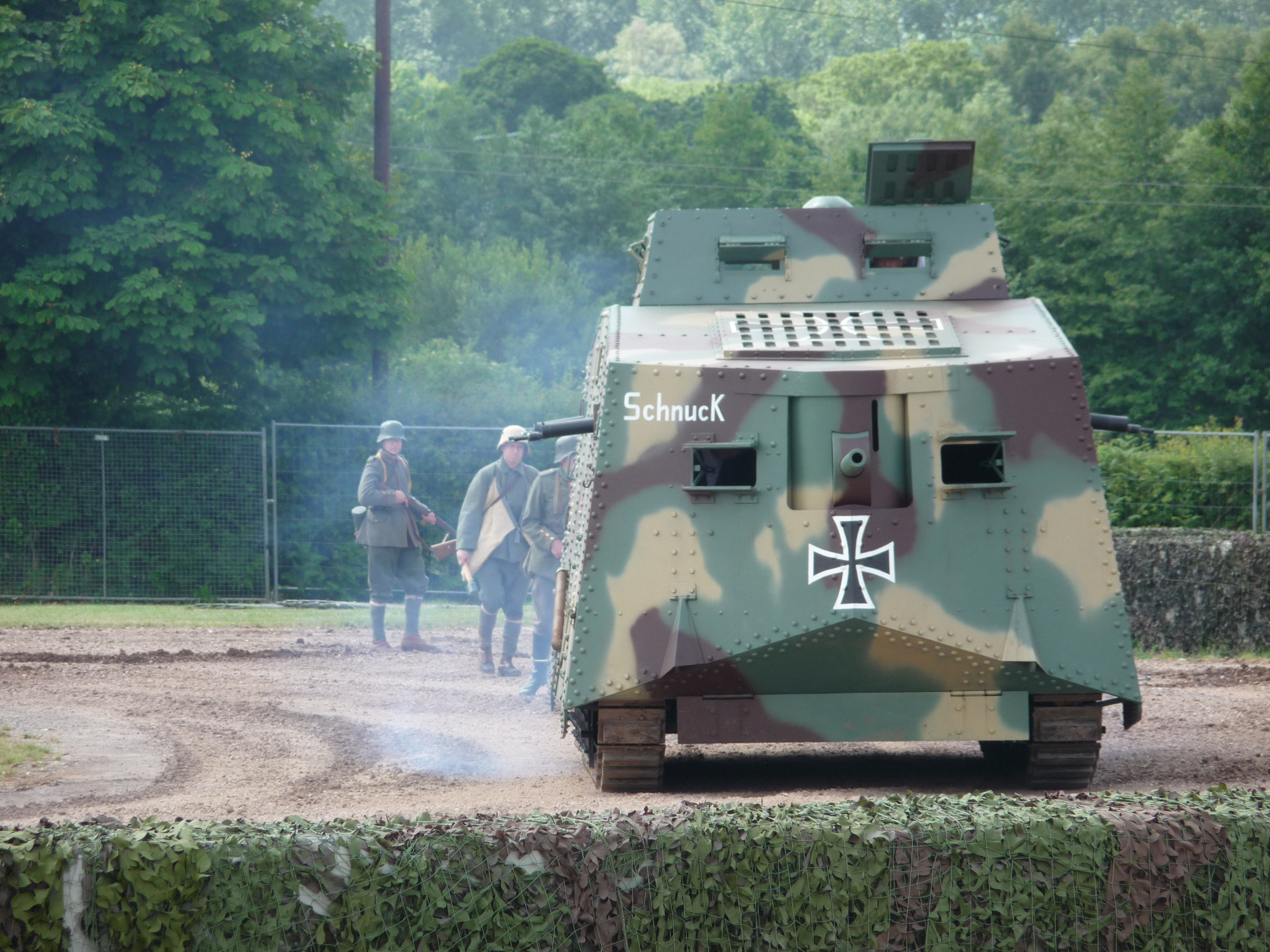
The Tank Museum at Bovington's A7V replica during a public display (June 2009)

There are numerous modern replicas, made to look like the original, many made of wood and modern materials:

- A running replica was built in 2009 by Bob Grundy of British Military Vehicles, Wigan, UK, a company that specialises in the restoration of old military vehicles. The replica is constructed of plywood and angle iron, using the engine, transmission and tracks from two Fordson County Crawlers – tracked agricultural vehicles – and is painted to represent A7V number 504, Schnuck. It was purchased by The Tank Museum, Bovington, in November 2012. It is on display inside the museum, and takes part in outdoor displays alongside the museum's replica British Mark IV that was constructed for the film War Horse.
- A static replica is in the Deutsches Panzermuseum in Munster. It is named Wotan, but is largely based on the surviving example, Mephisto.
- A mobile mock-up of an A7V appears in the East German feature film Trotz Alledem (1972), the story of Karl Liebknecht and the 1919 Spartacist uprising in Berlin.
- A mock-up is among the vehicles at the Milovice Tankodrome in the Czech Republic.

== See also ==
- Tanks in the German Army
- Überlandwagen
- Panzer
- Fiat 2000
