= Mephisto (tank) =

Last surviving German A7V tank (WWI-era)

Coordinates: 27°28′22.77″S 153°01′04.45″E

Mephisto AV7 on currently on display level 1 ANZAC Display, Queensland Museum, 2025

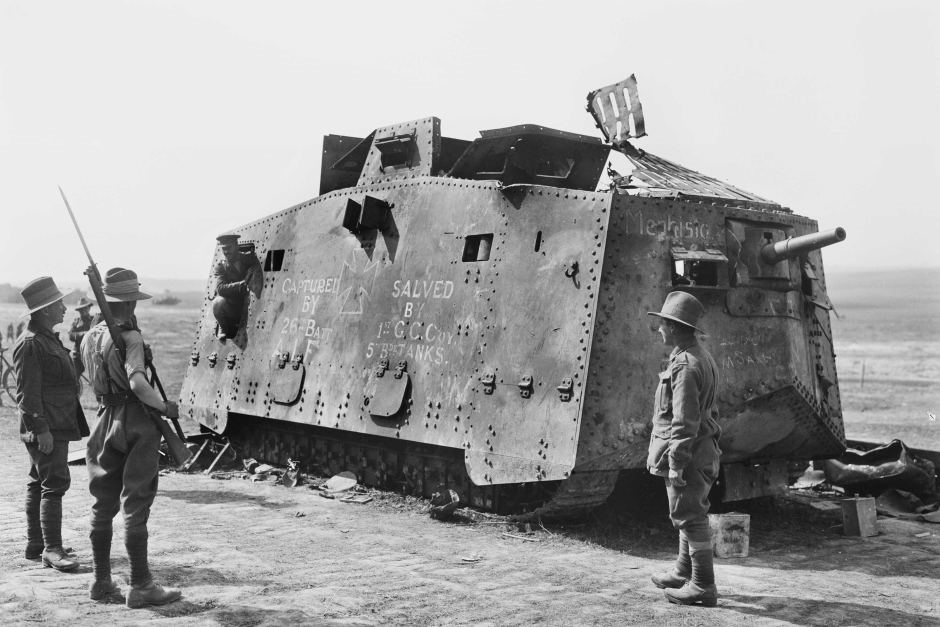
Mephisto after recovery from the battlefield.

Mephisto is a World War I German tank, the only surviving A7V. In April 1918, during a German attack at Villers-Bretonneux on the Western Front, it became stuck in a shell-hole and was abandoned by its crew. It was recovered by Allied troops about three months later and, after the war, taken to Australia as a trophy. Mephisto is housed at the Queensland Museum, in Brisbane, in the ANZAC Legacy Gallery. It is not in mechanically running order.

== History ==
=== Background ===
The vehicle was issued to the German army in late December 1917 or early January 1918, and was given vehicle number 506.

On March 21 it took part, along with 4 other A7Vs and 5 captured British tanks, in a moderately successful attack at Curgies, north-east of Saint-Quentin.

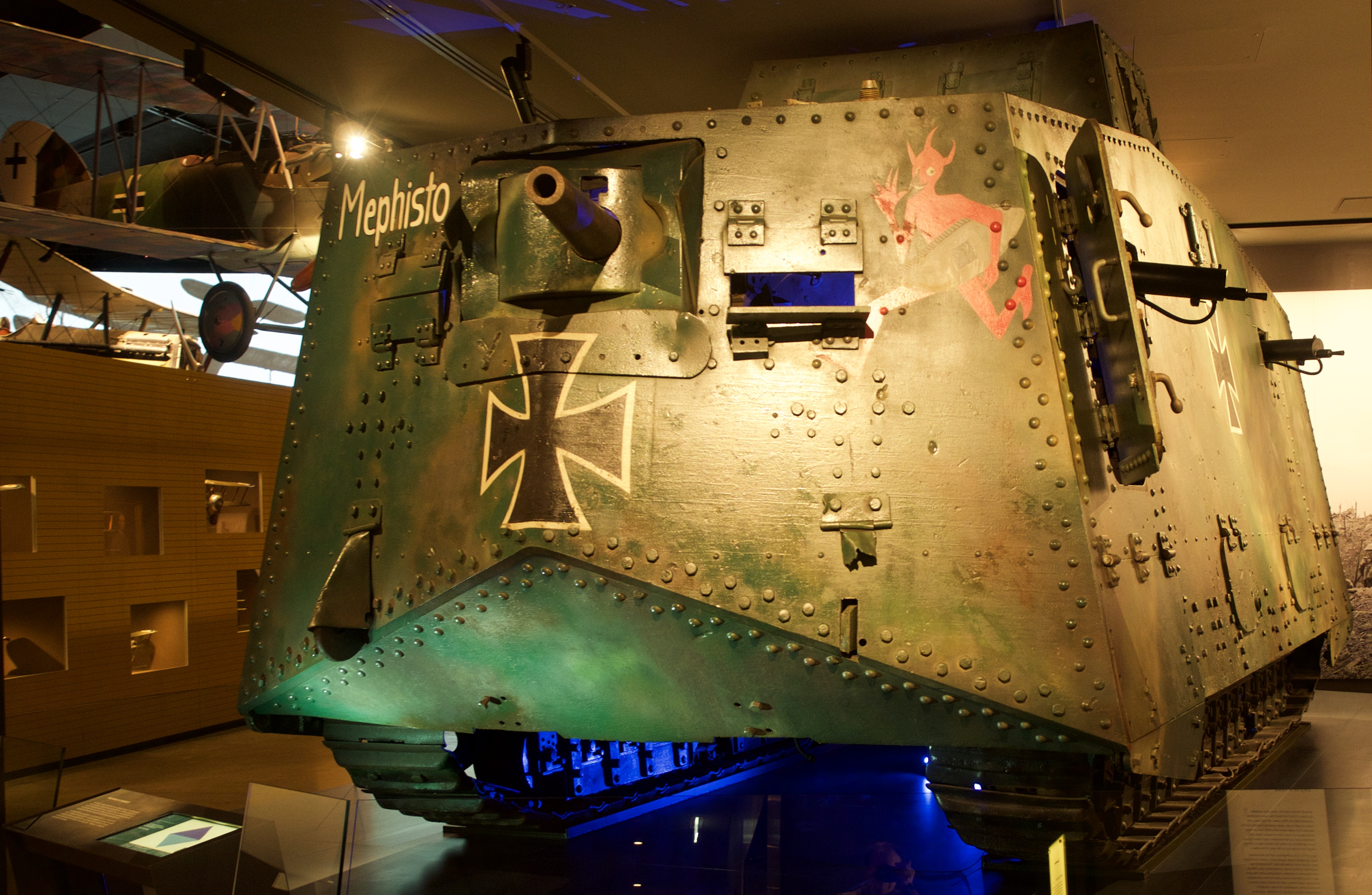
Mephisto on display in the Australian War Memorial.

It was then taken to the German tank workshop near Charleroi, for minor repairs and repainting, and was re-issued in mid-April. Its new commander was Lieutenant Heinz Theunissen. By this time it had become fashionable to name A7Vs after figures from German history or mythology, and it is believed that Theunissen chose the name Mephisto, a demon from German folklore. The name was painted on the front and rear armour. A figure was also painted on the front armour depicting a red demon running off with part of a British tank under its arm. The inspiration for this was taken from a contemporary advertising poster for Persil laundry detergent.

Meanwhile, the German high command was planning an attack on Villers-Bretonneux, hoping to capture the town and the hill to the north so that their artillery could dominate the important road and rail junction of Amiens, some 20 kilometres to the west. After several days of reconnaissance it was decided that the ground was suitable for tanks, and fifteen A7Vs were allocated to the assault. The ground was firm, gently sloping, and relatively free from shell craters, and the Allied defences were comparatively weak.

On the night of April 21st, fourteen of the vehicles (one refused to start) were loaded onto trains and taken by rail to Guillaucourt, unloaded, and hidden a short distance away near the village of Wiencourt-l'Équipée, about 4 km from the German trenches. A second A7V then broke down, which left thirteen available for the attack. At 3.45 a.m. on the 24th, they moved to the village of Marcelcave for refuelling. A 6-man infantry patrol was allocated to each tank, to act as reconnaissance, and the entire force then took up its starting position close behind the Line in preparation for the attack at 6 a.m.

=== The battle and counter-attack ===
The German tanks were divided into 3 groups, each with a set of objectives. Mephisto was part of the middle group, and advanced with the railway line on its right, towards its objective, the Bois d'Aquennes, west of the town, as part of the planned encirclement. The first contact with Allied troops came as Mephisto's group approached a settlement called by the Allies Monument Farm (French name Ferme de la Couture). The group advanced through an orchard in front of the farmhouse, forcing the British troops to withdraw, but Mephisto suffered a fuel blockage and had to stop, while the other tanks continued towards their objective. Theunissen and some of his crew advanced on foot to help with the attack on the farmhouse, but returned when Mephisto had been repaired. They were now some way behind the other tanks, so Theunissen set off in pursuit. However, soon after a shell landed immediately in front of the tank, creating a large crater. The tank pitched into it and became stuck. The crew had no option but to abandon the vehicle.

The operation, though, had been a success, and the town had been captured. Two other A7Vs (Elfriede and Nixe) had been lost, and once the infantry had secured the captured territory the remaining tanks returned to Marcelcave.

The counter-attack began almost immediately, and during the night of the 24th Allied troops began to retake the lost territory. A7V Elfriede had overturned but was still functional and was later recovered by French and British troops, the first A7V to be captured. A German demolition team had blown up Nixe to prevent it being used by the Allies.

The next day, the Allied attacks continued, and the Germans withdrew to the south-east in an attempt to avoid encirclement. By early morning on the 26th the lines had returned almost to their previous positions, but the orchard at Monument Farm remained in German hands, with Mephisto, unbeknownst to the Allies, still immobilised but intact in the crater.

=== Recovery from the battlefield ===
The front between the two armies was now a series of connected "outposts" rather than the continuous parallel deep trenches that had been a feature of the earlier years of the war. In the weeks after the battle for Villers-Bretonneux, units of the Australian Imperial Force began a series of small, often impromptu, raids on enemy outposts, surrounding and occupying them and killing or taking prisoner the occupants. The effect was to gradually push back the German front line. During one of these excursions, on July 9, men of the 28th Battalion in Monument Wood came across Mephisto but had to retire after coming under enemy fire. On the night of the 13th, 26 Battalion took over the section of the front and soon completed the occupation of the wood. In 26th Battalion's Diary for July 14th, Lieutenant H.F. Pearson reported that "during the attack the Battalion captured the derelict German tank No. 506 Mephisto."

The commanding officer of 26th Battalion, Lieutenant-Colonel James Robinson, decided that the tank should be acquired as a trophy. With approval from General Evan Wisdom (commanding the 7th Brigade, of which the 26th battalion was part) he liaised with Major Harrington of the Tank Corps and with artillery officers. On the night of the 15th, Pearson took three officers of the British 1st Gun Carrier Company to inspect the vehicle and assess the feasibility of recovering it. They decided it was possible, but dangerous because of the proximity of German positions. Therefore, on the 17th 26 Battalion pushed their line further forward. On the 19th, they were relieved by 23 Battalion, who, in turn, continued to push the Germans still further back. A recovery operation was planned for the night of July 22nd. Lieutenant A.J. Mutton, Reconnaissance Officer of the Gun Carrier Company, selected the route the evacuation should take, and during the night of the 20th and 21st, working parties of men from 26 Battalion cleared the route for the vehicles and filled in shell holes.

On the night of the 22nd, two vehicles of 1st Gun Carrier Company (there has been debate as to whether the vehicles used were Mark IV tanks or Gun Carriers: informed opinion is now that they were the latter), with a detail of 23 men, set off from Villers-Bretonneux, towards Monument Wood. They were accompanied by 13 men of 26 Battalion. To cover the noise of the operation, an aircraft flew low overhead and Allied artillery carried out sporadic shelling. The Germans launched an apparently pre-planned gas shell bombardment, forcing the recovery party to wear their gas masks.

A steel cable was attached to the tank, and the vehicle was towed about 4 kilometres (2.5 mi) westwards to the temporary cover of the Bois l'Abbé. The recovery party obscured the trail and laid a false one to mislead German aircraft observers. From there, Mephisto was moved by stages to the 5th Tank Brigade training ground at Vaux-en-Amiénois.

At Vaux it created much interest amongst the troops. The vehicle was covered in graffiti, and, according to Lt-Col Robinson, "the battalion wag got busy and painted (on the tank's side) quite a good illustration of the British lion with his paw on a German tank." Painted on the other side were: the Rising Sun badge of the Australian Army, the words "Captured by 26th Batt, A.I.F.", and the battalion's badge; and "Salved by 1st G.C. Coy (Gun Carrier Company) 5th Bn. Tanks" together with the 5th battalion's badge. Many soldiers wrote their name and sometimes their regiment or battalion on the hull. Over the years, all these embellishments disappeared, but they can be seen in contemporary photographs. Various parts of the tank were taken as souvenirs.

=== Transport to Australia ===
In October 1918, Mephisto was moved the short distance to Poulainville, where there was a railway siding. From there it was transported by rail to the Tank Corps Gunnery School at Merlimont and then shipped from Dunkirk to London. Proposals for it to be displayed as a war trophy in Australia were raised, and on 2 April 1919 it was loaded on the SS Armagh at Tilbury, destined for Sydney via Plymouth, Cape Town, Durban, Adelaide, and Melbourne, along with 1,423 returning ANZAC troops.

While the Armagh was at sea, Mephisto's ultimate destination became the subject of rivalry. According to Robinson, "Firstly the Imperial authorities claimed it, then the Melbourne people wanted it for their city. Finally, largely owing to the strenuous and unceasing efforts of the Queensland Agent-General (Sir Thomas Robinson) and General E. Wisdom C.B., C.M.G., D.S.O." it was decided to deliver Mephisto to Brisbane.

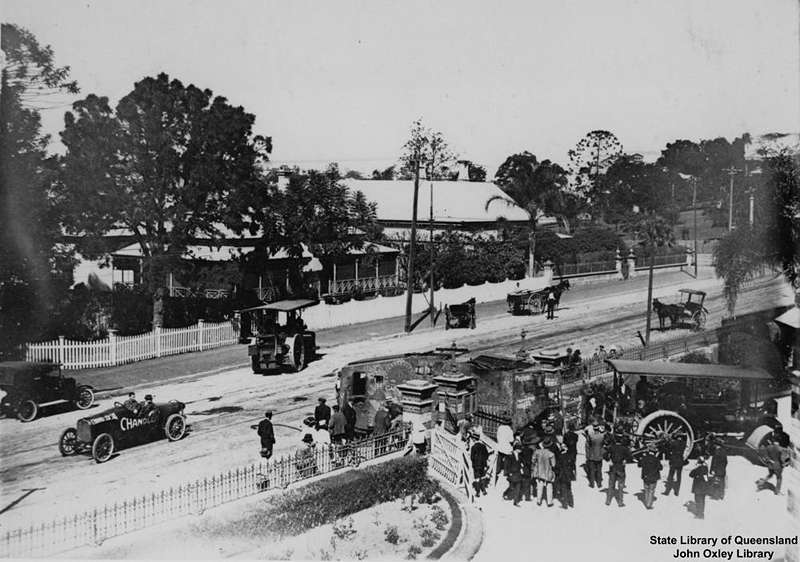
Mephisto being dragged into the Queensland Museum by two steamrollers in 1919

It arrived on 6 June 1919 at the Norman Wharf (near the intersection of Creek Street and Eagle Street, approximately where the Eagle Street Pier ferry wharf is today) in the Brisbane River. On 22 August 1919 two steamrollers from the Brisbane Municipal Council pulled Mephisto (travelling on its own caterpillar treads) from the wharf to the Queensland Museum (then at the Old Museum building in Bowen Hills), a journey of less than 2 miles taking 11 hours.

=== Exhibition ===
As early as September 1920 the Brisbane Courier complained in an editorial about Mephisto's exposed position and the deterioration in its condition caused by the weather, especially the obliteration of the inscriptions on the hull, "which, to some, are sacred." The Queensland Museum changed its location several times, and a number of shelters were built, to offer some protection from the rain. In 1986 the museum relocated to the Queensland Cultural Centre, where Mephisto was moved indoors and, later, put behind glass in a temperature controlled environment that protected it from the public.

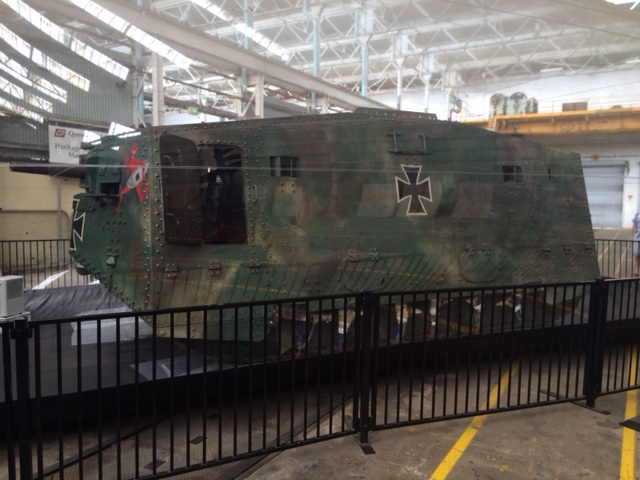
A7V Mephisto on display at The Workshops Rail Museum in Ipswich, Queensland, 2014

The vehicle was partly submerged during the 2011 Brisbane floods, and was taken to the Workshops Rail Museum at North Ipswich for extensive restoration. In June 2015, it was transported to the Australian War Memorial in Canberra, to take part in the World War I centenary commemorations, and in February 2018 it was returned to the Queensland Museum, where it is now on permanent display in the ANZAC Legacy Gallery.

In 2023 the museum was donated a floating compass which, it claimed, was souvenired by an Australian Army officer in early 1919 while the vehicle was at London's Tilbury Docks awaiting shipment to Australia. Doubts have since been raised regarding the authenticity of this souvenir, there being no proof that compasses were ever fitted to German tanks; that the museum's example was ever installed in Mephisto; that it is of German military origin and; that it was even made in Germany.

== Soldiers' names visible on the tank ==
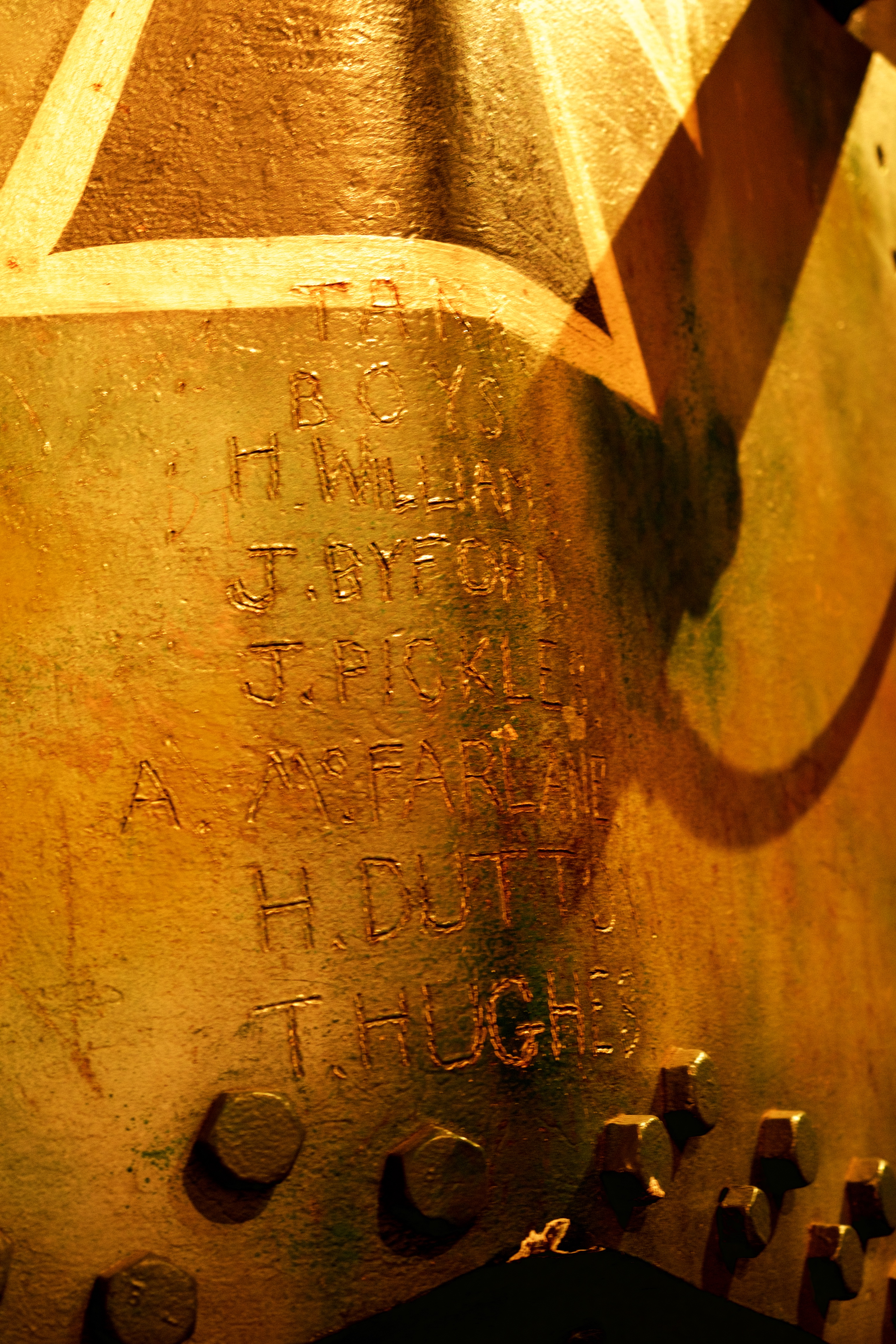
Soldiers' names engraved in Mephisto's rear armour.

All the men's names written in chalk or paint have long been erased by the elements or during repainting, but thirteen names hammered into the hull with a chisel or punch are still visible. In the centre of the rear face of the tank, under the inscription "Tank Boys", are the names of six men: H. Williams, J. Byford, J. Pickles, A. McFarlane, H. Dutton, and T. Hughes. These are not the names of men of 26th Battalion who took part in the recovery; none of those names can be found in the Battalion records between July and November 1918. However, all six names match those of soldiers listed in the Tank Corps in late 1918.

There are two further names on the rear armour: A. Wallace, and "TJR"; three on the left side: E.(or L.) E. Smith, H. Scaddon (probably Scaddan) and Sonny Arundell; and on the front, D. Mason and R. Aldrich. Of those seven, four were civilian railway workers who served in the 5th Australian Broad Gauge Railway Operating Company (ABGROC) in Belgium and France.

== Replica ==
A replica A7V named "Wotan" but modelled substantially on "Mephisto" was built in Germany in 1988, and is on display at the German Tank Museum in Munster.

== In popular culture ==
In 2014 Stephen Dando-Collins published Tank Boys, a book set against the battle of Villers-Bretonneux and the fate of Mephisto. The protagonists are three under-age soldiers, two Australian and one German. The book is recommended by Booktopia as suitable for ages 10–12, and the Children’s Book Council of Australia reviewed it favourably. The work contains a small number of historical and technical errors.

Mephisto appears as a visual overhaul (skin) in the 2016 first-person shooter Battlefield 1.

The Black Metal band 1914, from Lviv, Ukraine, released a song dedicated to the war machine and its crew on their 2018 album The Blind Leading The Blind.

== Gallery ==
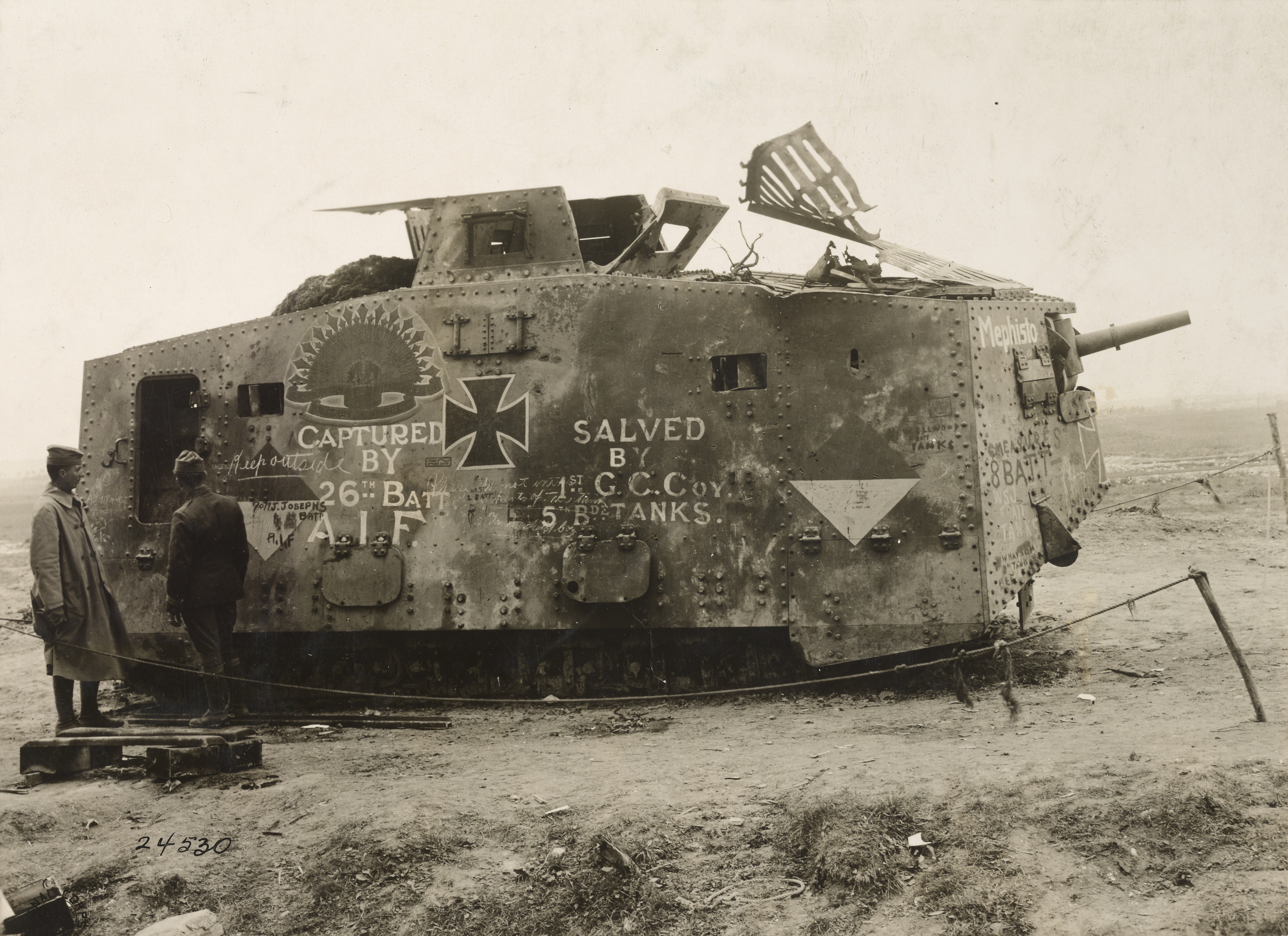
Mephisto after capture. Artwork and graffiti by Australian troops is clearly visible.

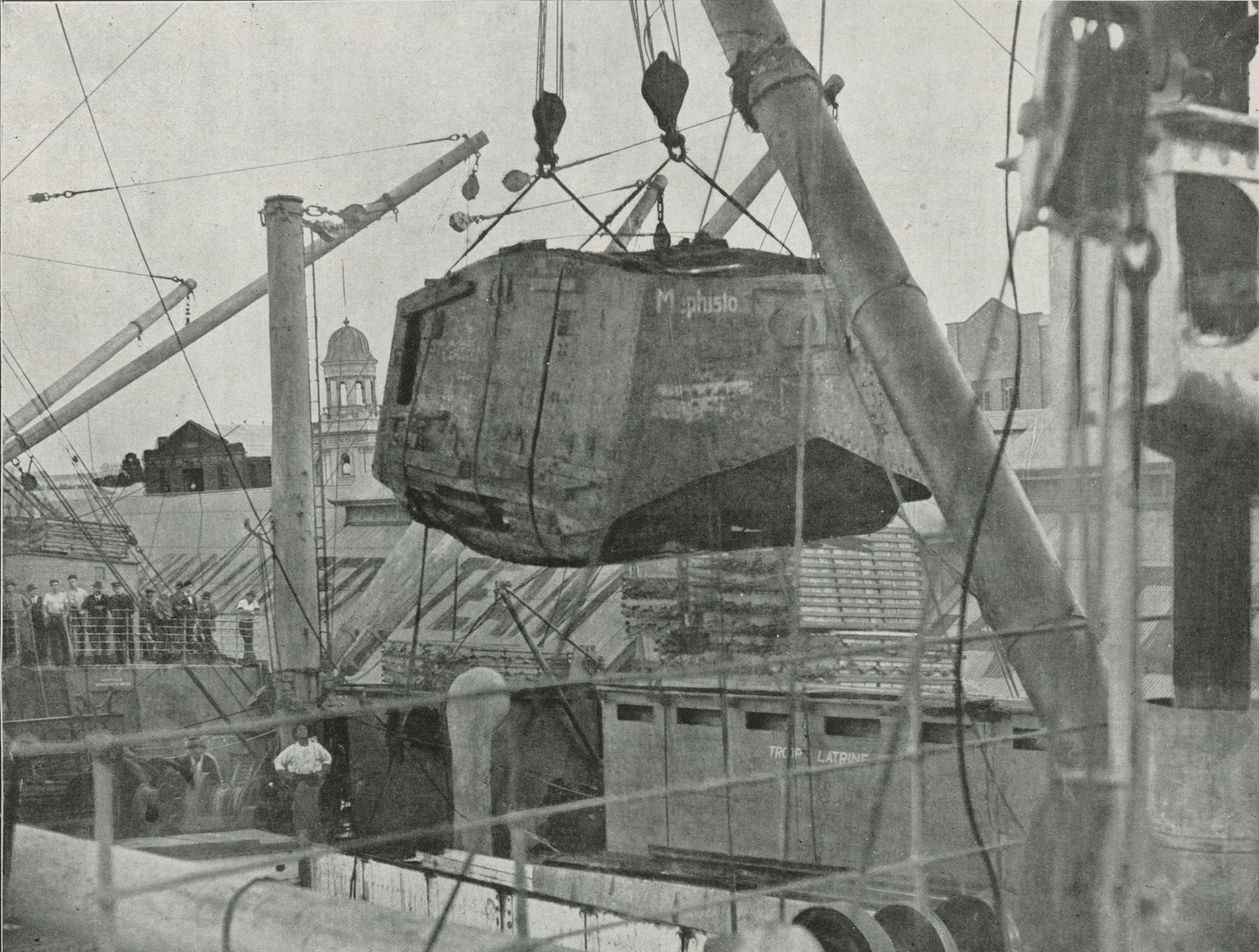
June 14, 1919, Mephisto unloads off the SS Armagh at Brisbane

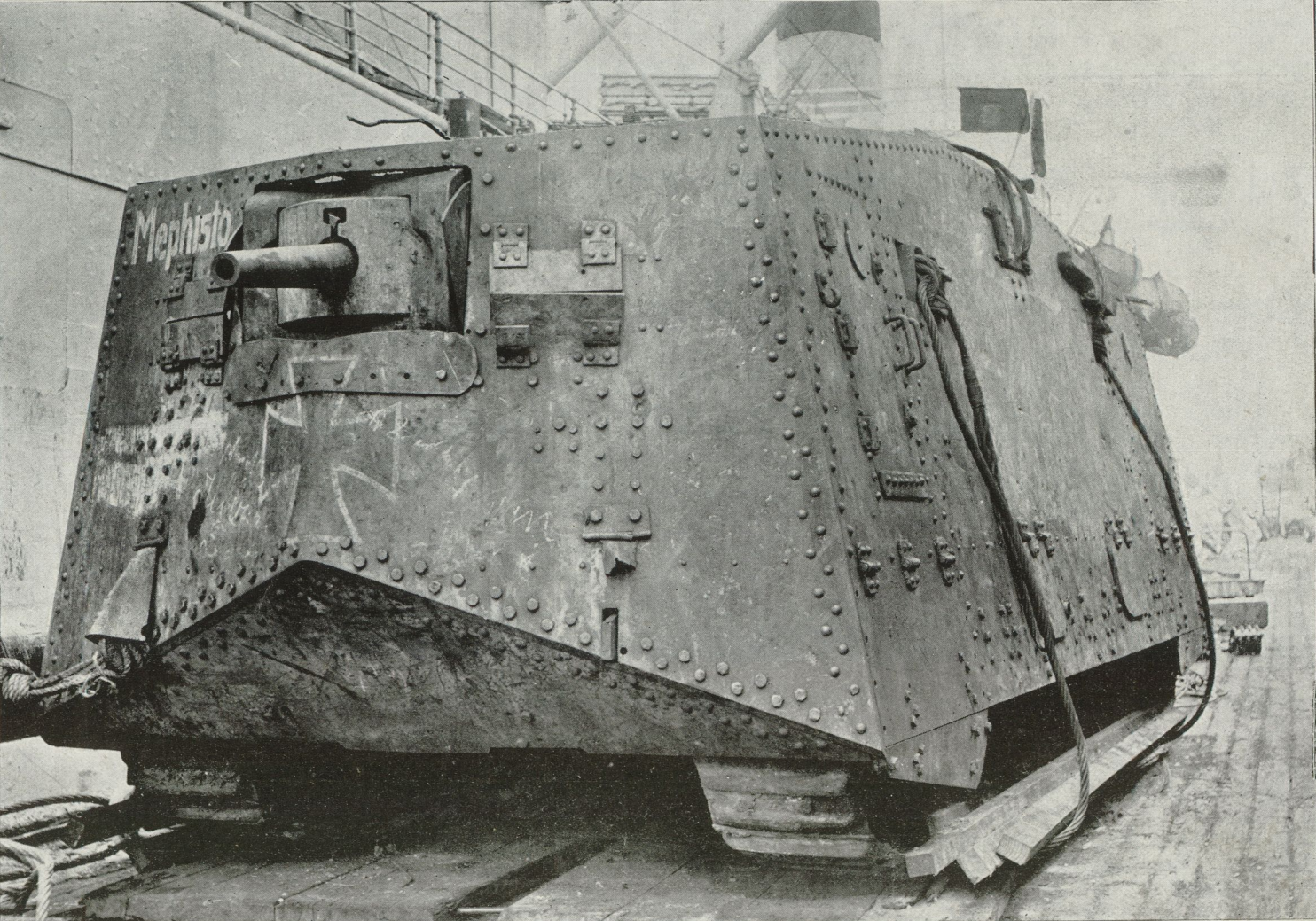
Mephisto lands at Brisbane

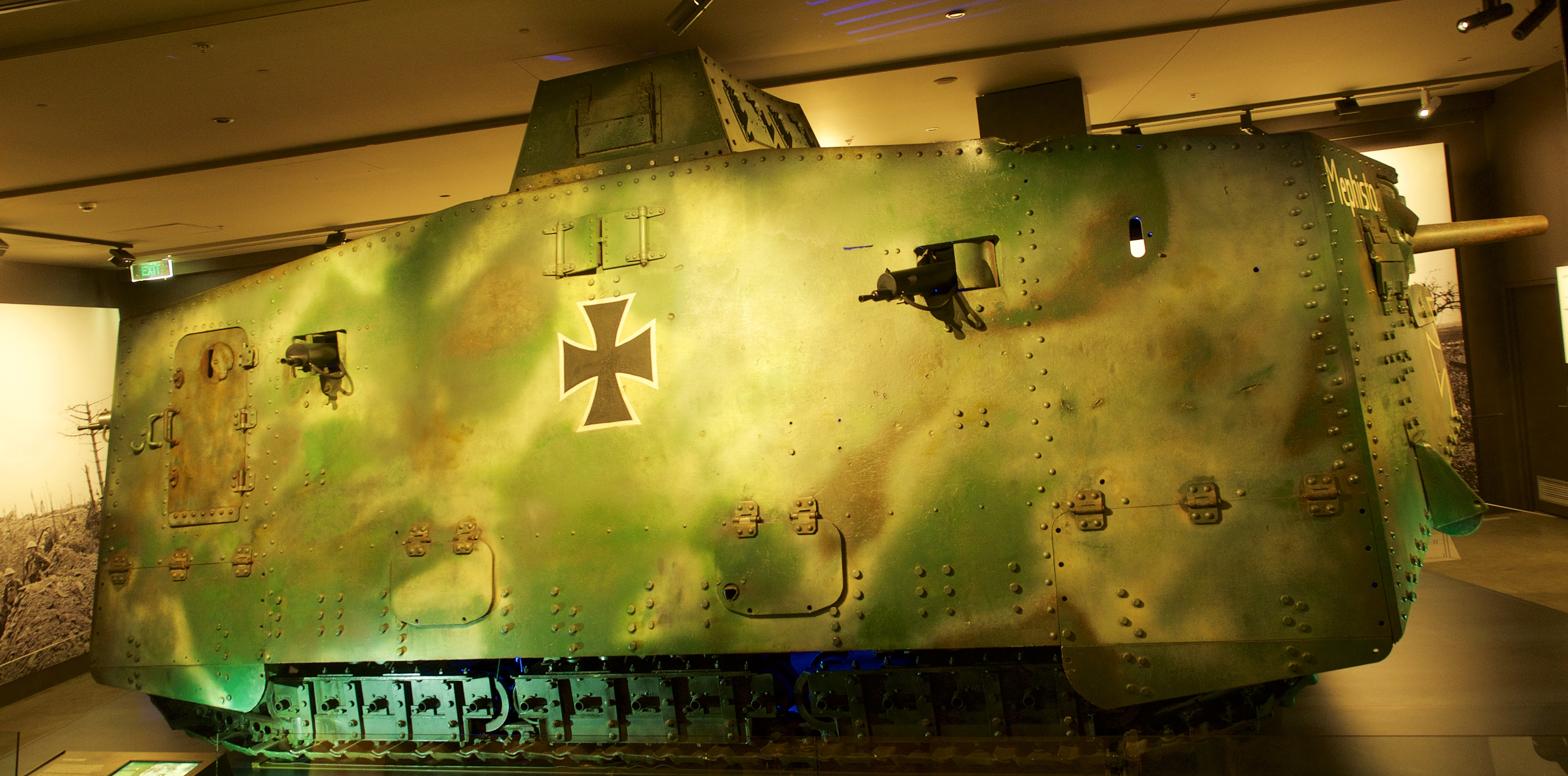
Mephisto on display in the Australian War Memorial, July 2015.

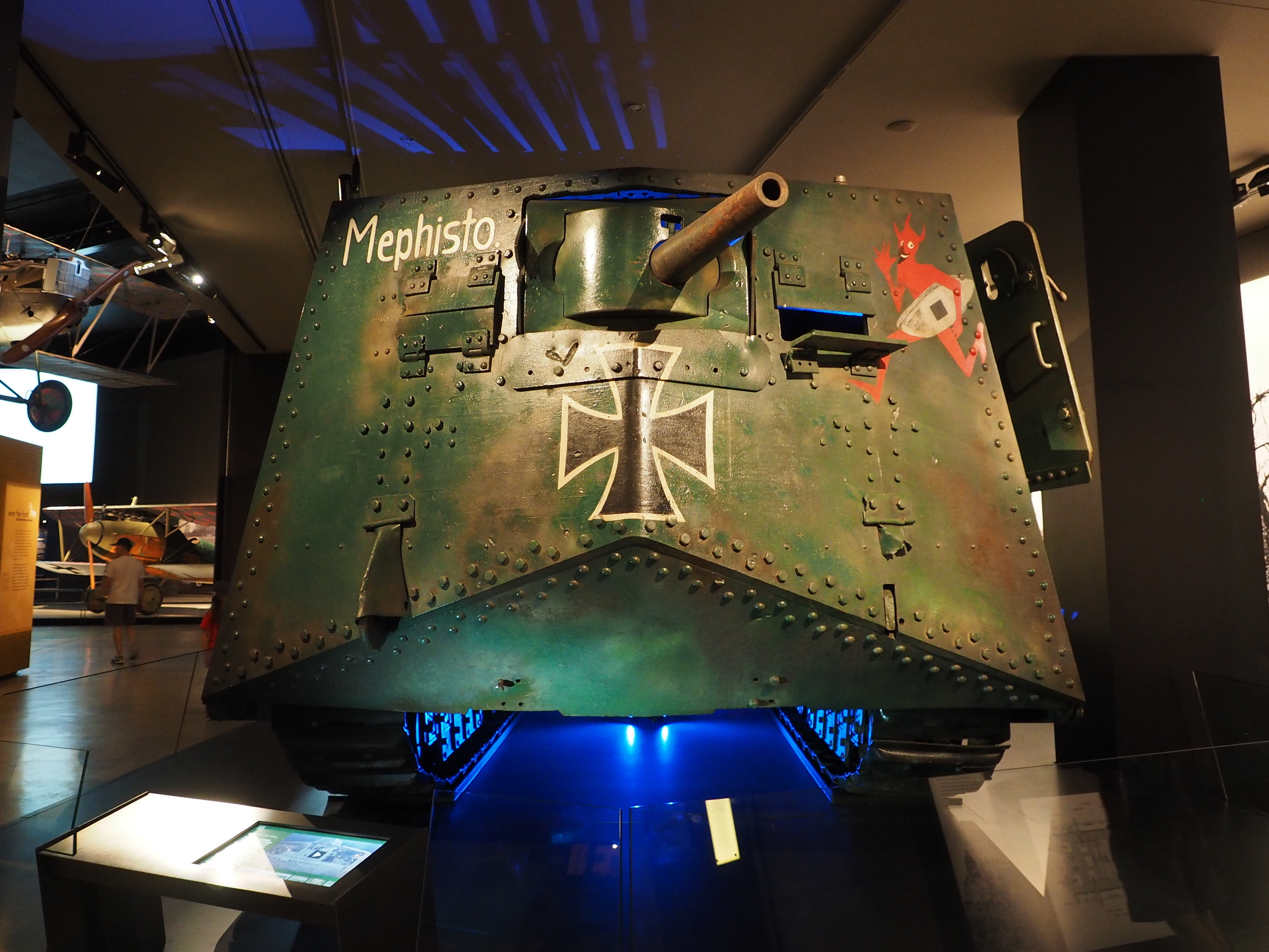
The front of Mephisto

== Bibliography ==
Jones, Rarey, Icks (1969). The Fighting Tanks Since 1916. WE Inc.

Strasheim, R. & Hundleby, M. (2010 and 2020 reprint) Sturmpanzer A7V. Tankograd. ISBN 978-3-936519-11-2

Whitmore, M. (1994). Mephisto! Part II. Journal of Australian Military History, Oct-Nov, 1994. pages 58-64.

Strasheim, R. & Hundleby, M. (1990.) The German A7V Tank and the Captured British Mark IV Tanks of World War I. Haynes. ISBN 0-85429-788-X

Czechura, G. & Hopkins-Weise, J. (2008). A7V Mephisto. Queensland Museum. ISBN 9780980569209.

Whitmore, M. (1989). Mephisto A7V Sturmpanzerwagen 506 : a History of the Sole Surviving First World War German Tank. Queensland Museum ISBN 0724233881

Jordan, L. (2017). Stealth Raiders: A Few Daring Men in 1918. Penguin Random House Australia, ISBN 0143786636

Goode, T. (2017). The Cold-Footed Mob - A History of the 5th Australian Broad Gauge Railway Operating Company. Hesperian Press, ISBN 9780859056533.
