= Holt tractor =

American tractor models, 1892-1925

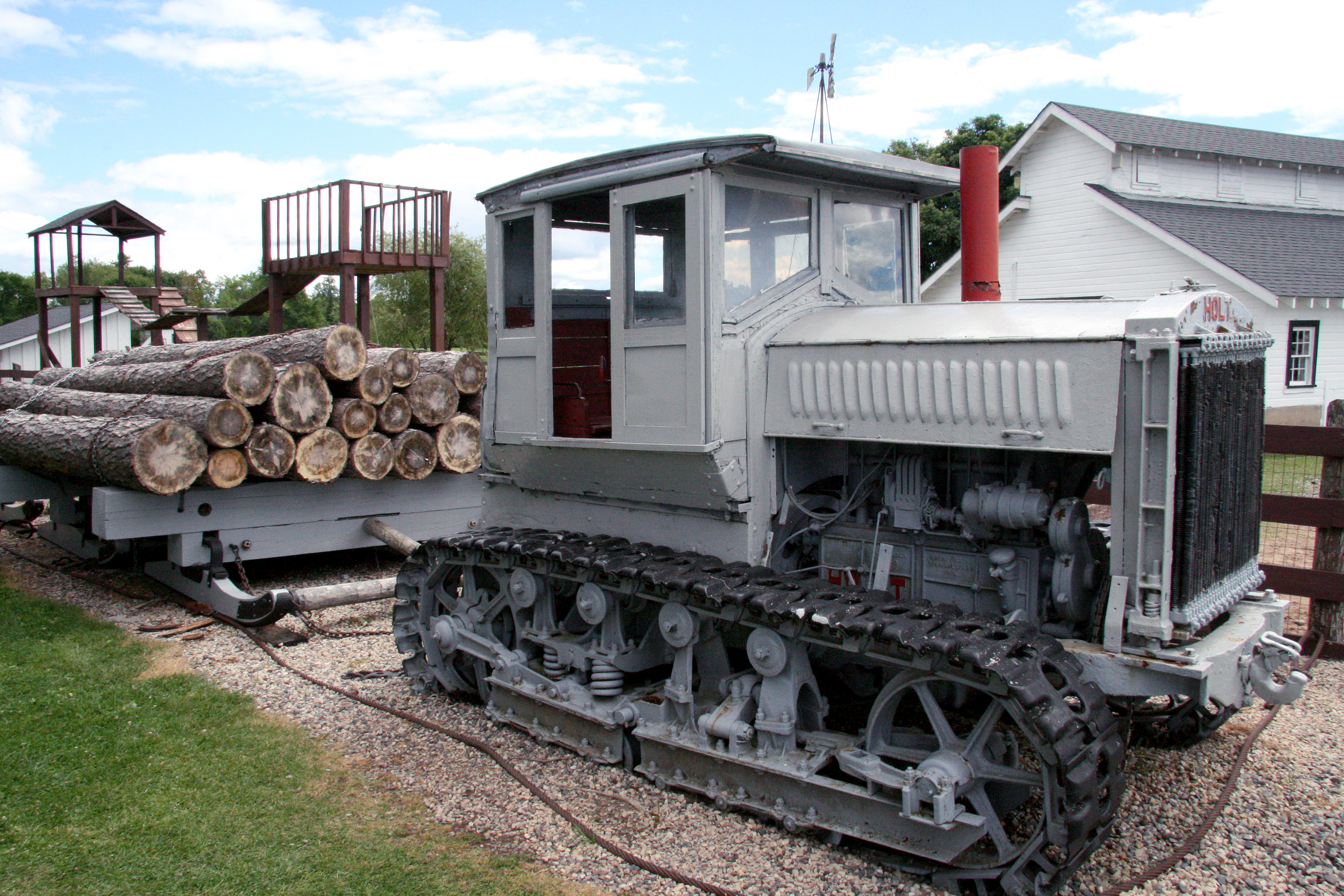
HOLT 10 Ton (before 1925)

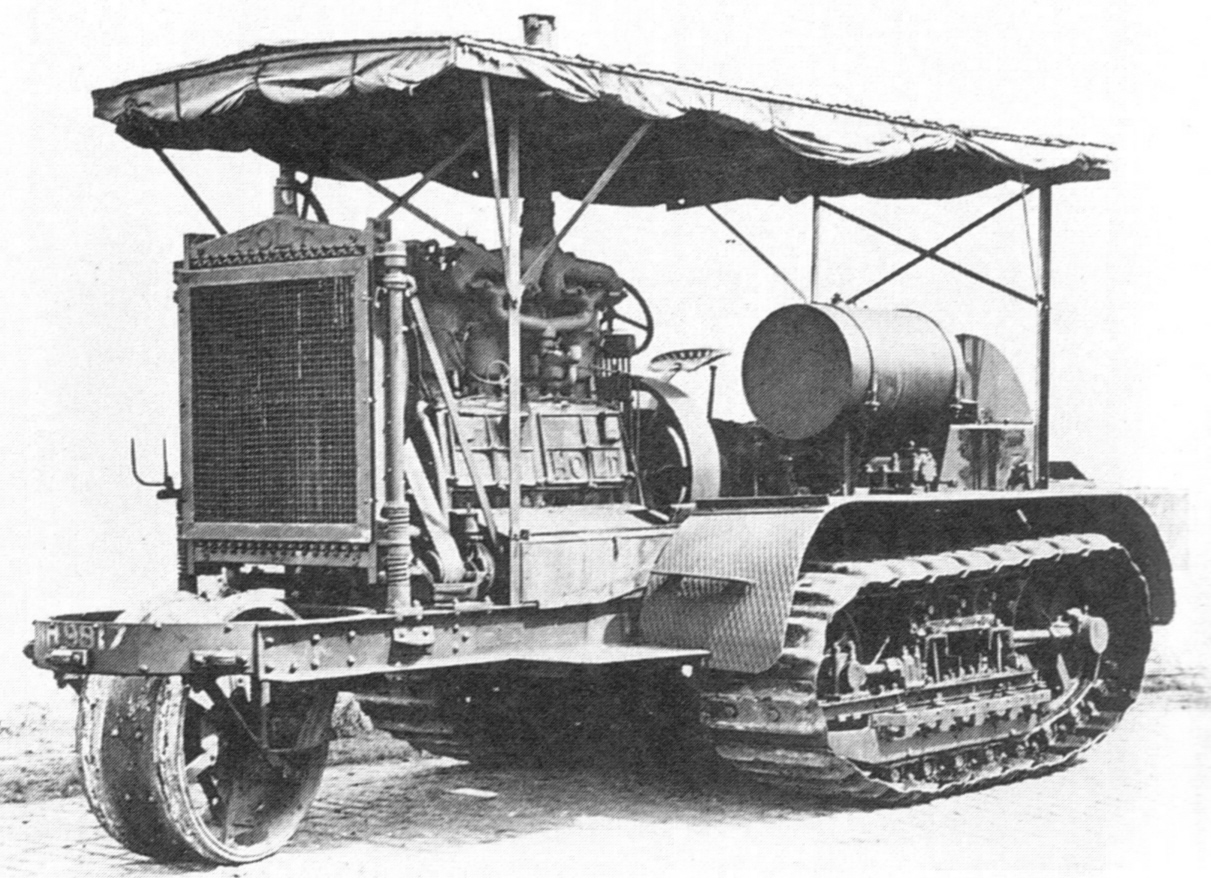
The Holt 75 tractor, circa 1914

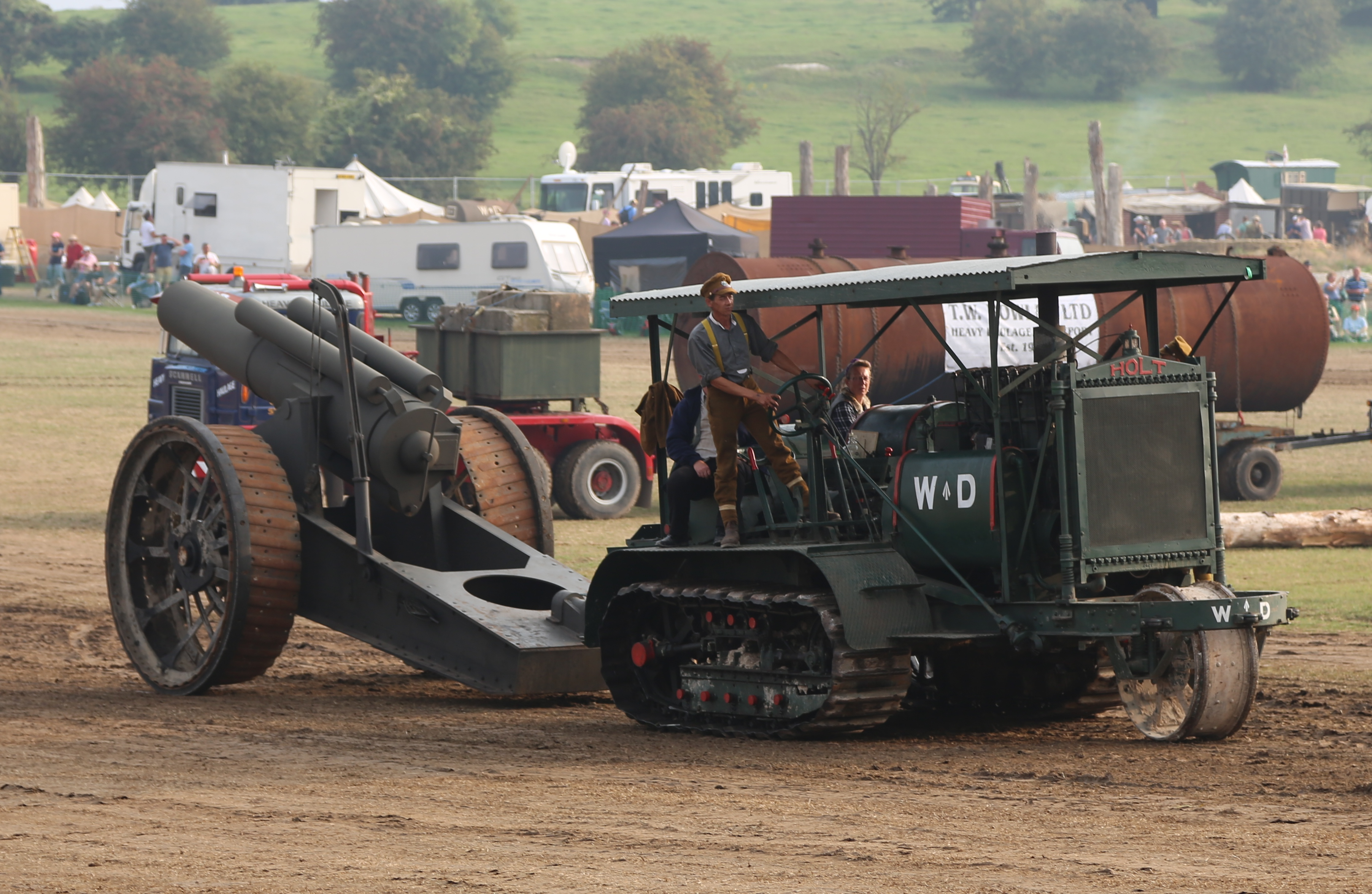
A Holt 75 hauling a replica 8-inch howitzer

The Holt tractors were a range of continuous track haulers built by the Holt Manufacturing Company of Stockton, California which were named after company founder Benjamin Holt.

Between 1908 and 1913, twenty-seven of the first 100 Holt caterpillar track-type tractors were used on the Los Angeles Aqueduct project, which provided a good proving ground for these machines.

== Military use ==
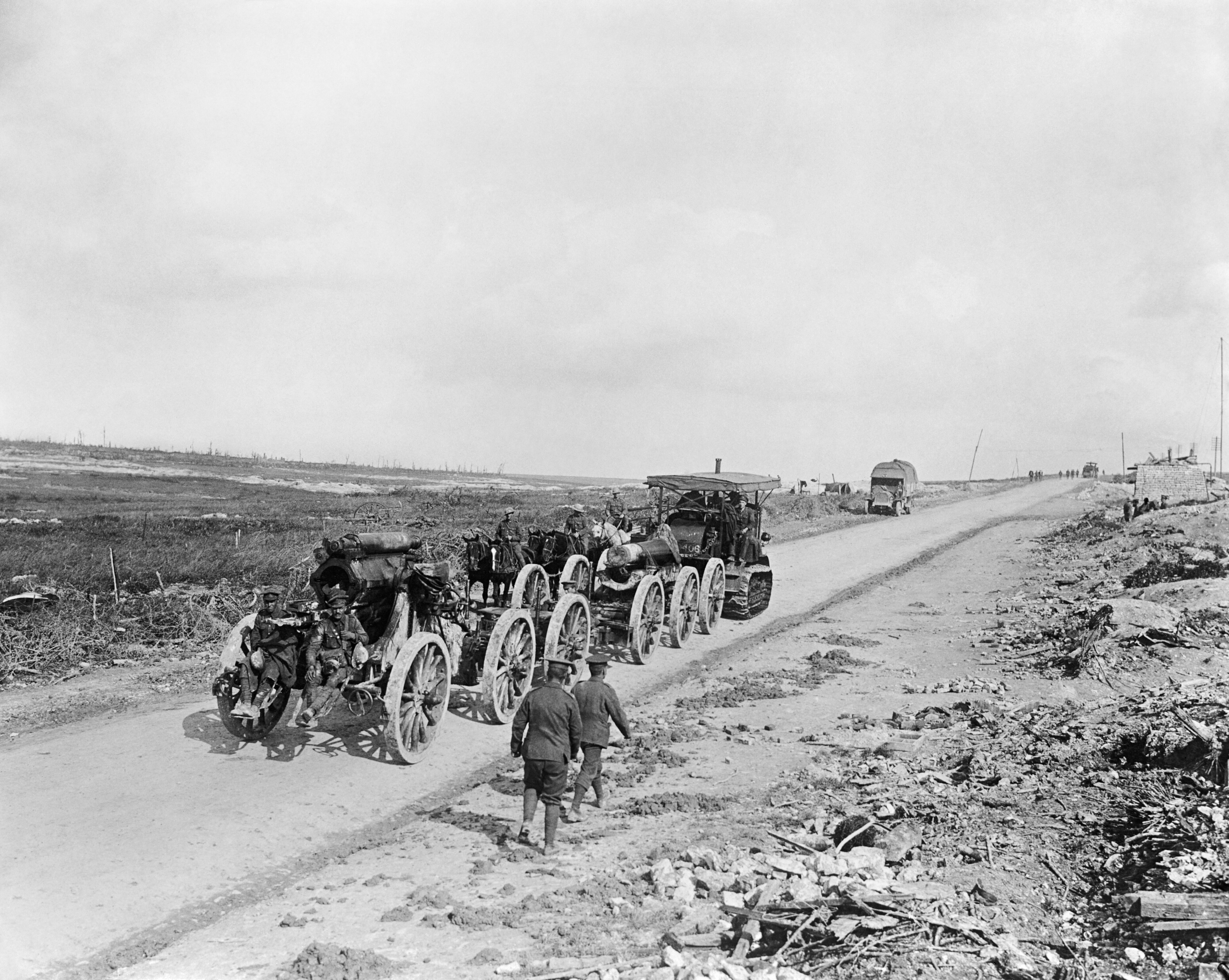
A Holt tractor hauling a 9.2-inch howitzer to a forward area in The Battle of the Somme July–November 1916

They were widely used by the British, French and American armies in the First World War for hauling heavy artillery including the BL 9.2-inch howitzer and the BL 8-inch howitzer. Around 2,000 Holt 75s along with 698 Holt 120s and 63 Holt 60s saw military use during the war. The French Schneider CA1 and Saint-Chamond and German A7V tanks were based on Holt tractors.

== Specification ==
There were at least three models used for military purposes: the Holt 75, the Holt 120 and to a lesser extent the Holt 60. The Holt 75 was first produced in 1913. It used two tracks for steering. It had a maximum speed of 15 miles per hour (24 km/h) and had a gasoline engine. In addition to US production 442 Holt 75s were built in Britain by Ruston & Hornsby in Lincoln. Production of the Holt 75 was to continue post war until 1924.

The 120 horsepower (89 kW) model had a tiller-type steering wheel at the front that was usually covered. It weighed about 18,000 pounds (8,200 kg), and was developed in direct response to a request for a heavy artillery tractor. The prototype was produced in 1914 with production beginning in 1915.

The Holt 60 which saw limited use in the war was introduced in 1911.

== Literature ==
- Holt Tractors Photo Archive: An Album of Steam and Early Gas Tractors, ISBN 978-1-882256-10-5

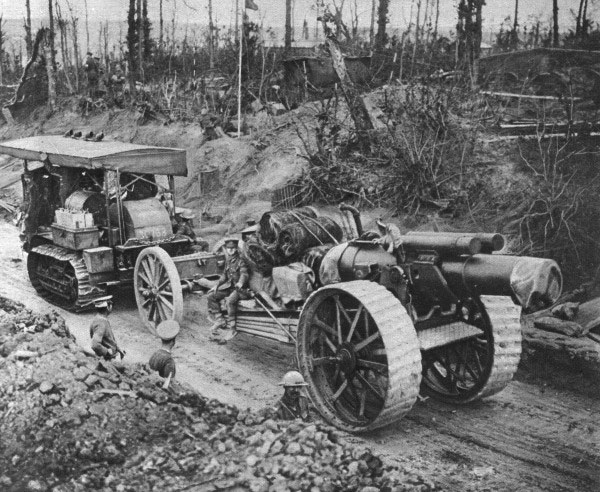
8-inch howitzer Mk V being towed by a Holt tractor at the Battle of the Somme, 1916
