= 91st Siege Battery, Royal Garrison Artillery =

Artillery unit of the British Army in World War I

91st Siege Battery, RGA
- Cap Badge of the Royal Regiment of Artillery
- Active: 1 December 1915–17 June 1919
- Country: United Kingdom
- Branch: British Army
- Role: Siege Artillery
- Size: Battery
- Part of: Royal Garrison Artillery
- Engagements: Battle of the Somme; Battle of the Ancre; Battle of Arras; Battle of Messines; Operations on Flanders Coast; German Spring Offensive; Hundred Days Offensive

Commanders
- Notable commanders: Maj William Christian

Insignia
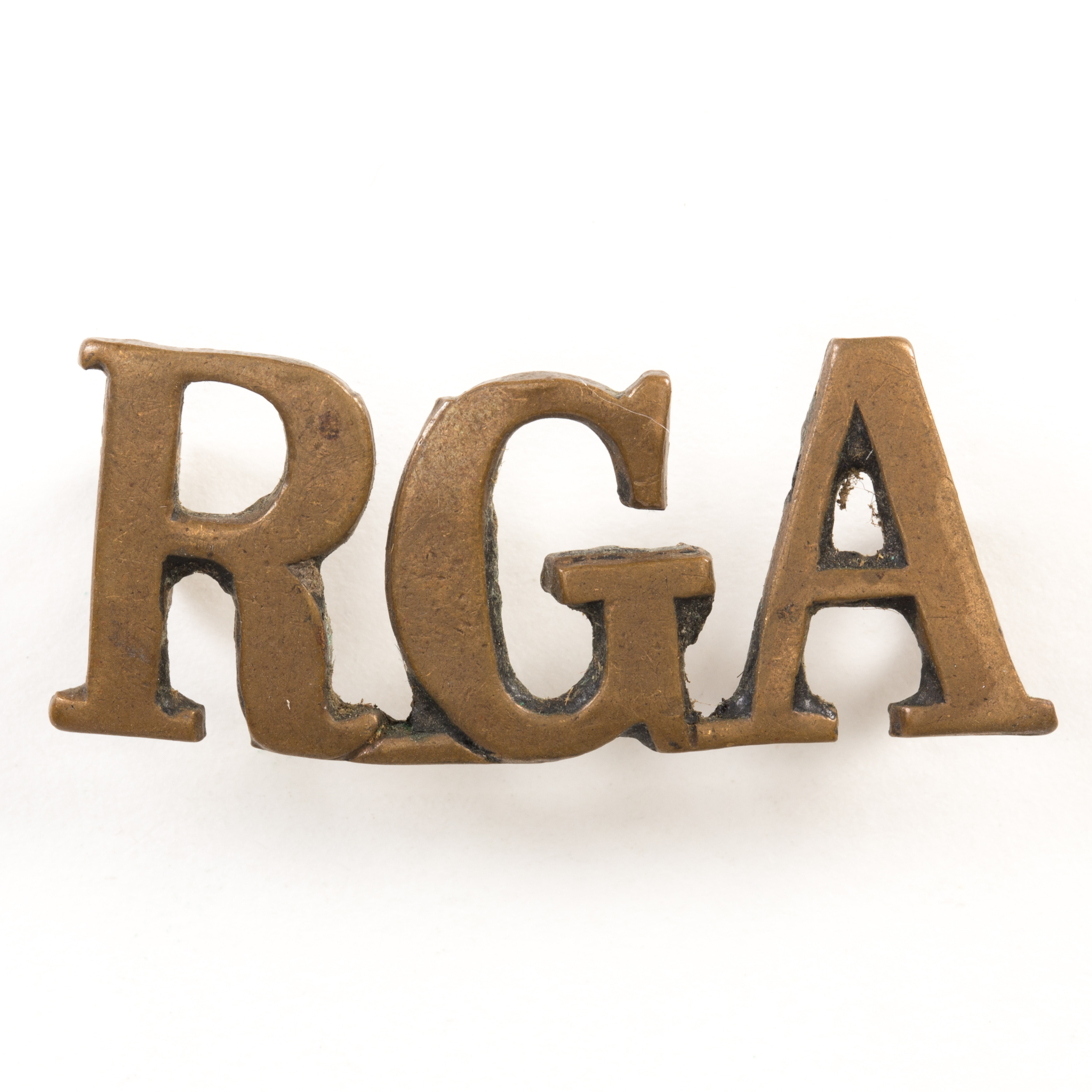
- Shoulder title

91st Siege Battery (91st SB) was a heavy howitzer unit of Britain's Royal Garrison Artillery (RGA) in World War I. Formed in December 1915, it served on the Somme and the Ancre, at Arras and at Messines. It was then stationed on the Flanders coast where it took part in months-long artillery duels. In 1918 it fought against the German Spring Offensive and participated in the final Allied Hundred Days Offensive. The battery was disbanded after the war.

== Mobilisation and training ==
Once the fighting on the Western Front had bogged down into Trench warfare in 1914, there was an urgent need for siege artillery, and a large number of new RGA units were hurriedly formed over the following years. On 24 November 1915 the War Office instructed that 91st Siege Battery would be formed as a heavy howitzer battery at Plymouth on 1 December. Temporary Major William Christian, who had served on the Western Front with 34th Siege Battery, arrived to take command. (Note: On the outbreak of war in August 1914, Captain Christian had been commanding the British Legation Guard in Peking (Beijing). His deputy had been Lieutenant R.H.A. Kellie, who served alongside him again in 34th SB and joined 91st SB as Battery Captain.) The battery had a nucleus of Regular Army non-commissioned officers (NCOs) from the Siege Depot at Cooden Camp, Bexhill-on-Sea, and the other ranks (ORs) were selected from the RGA at Plymouth. Although the first rush of volunteering was long over, Christian noted that the battery's ORs were all 'Kitchener's Army' volunteers and were keen to serve alongside their friends and relatives.

After about a month's training at Plymouth the battery moved to Horsham where it had the use of guns, directors, dial sights and signalling equipment at the School of Artillery established there. In mid-April the battery moved to the camp at Lydd where training continued and it fired six practice shoots with 6-inch and obsolete 8-inch howitzers. The battery was informed that it was to be equipped with 9.2-inch howitzers and on 5 May it was sent to Bristol to mobilise for overseas service. The four guns and associated stores began arriving on 7 May, and on 23 May the battery transport arrived. Manned by two officers and 95 ORs of the Army Service Corps (ASC), it comprised 33 lorries, one car (a Daimler 18-20 known within the battery as 'Mimi'), five motorcycles and the four Holt caterpillar gun tractors. An RGA advance party went by way of Southampton Docks to Le Havre in France, and a joint RGA/ASC party went to Avonmouth Docks to oversee the embarkation of the guns and transport. The remainder of the personnel left Bristol on 25 May and went by train via London to Folkestone Harbour where they embarked at 17.30 and arrived at Boulogne that night to join the British Expeditionary Force (BEF).

== Western Front ==
Once the various parties of 91st SB had concentrated at Boulogne, the gunners left by lorry on 1 June for the Doullens area, while the guns and tractors went by rail. The battery reached its assigned positions at Pommier on 2 June, when it joined 19th Heavy Artillery Group (HAG) in Third Army. The gunners began laying gun platforms and constructing dugouts, and in so doing discovered an old shaft with chambers left by former chalk mining. After miners among the battery's personnel had dug an intercepting tunnel these chambers were capable of accommodating the whole battery 70 feet (21 m) below ground. By 10 June the battery had brought the first three howitzers up after dark and had camouflaged them in an orchard on the south side of Pommier.

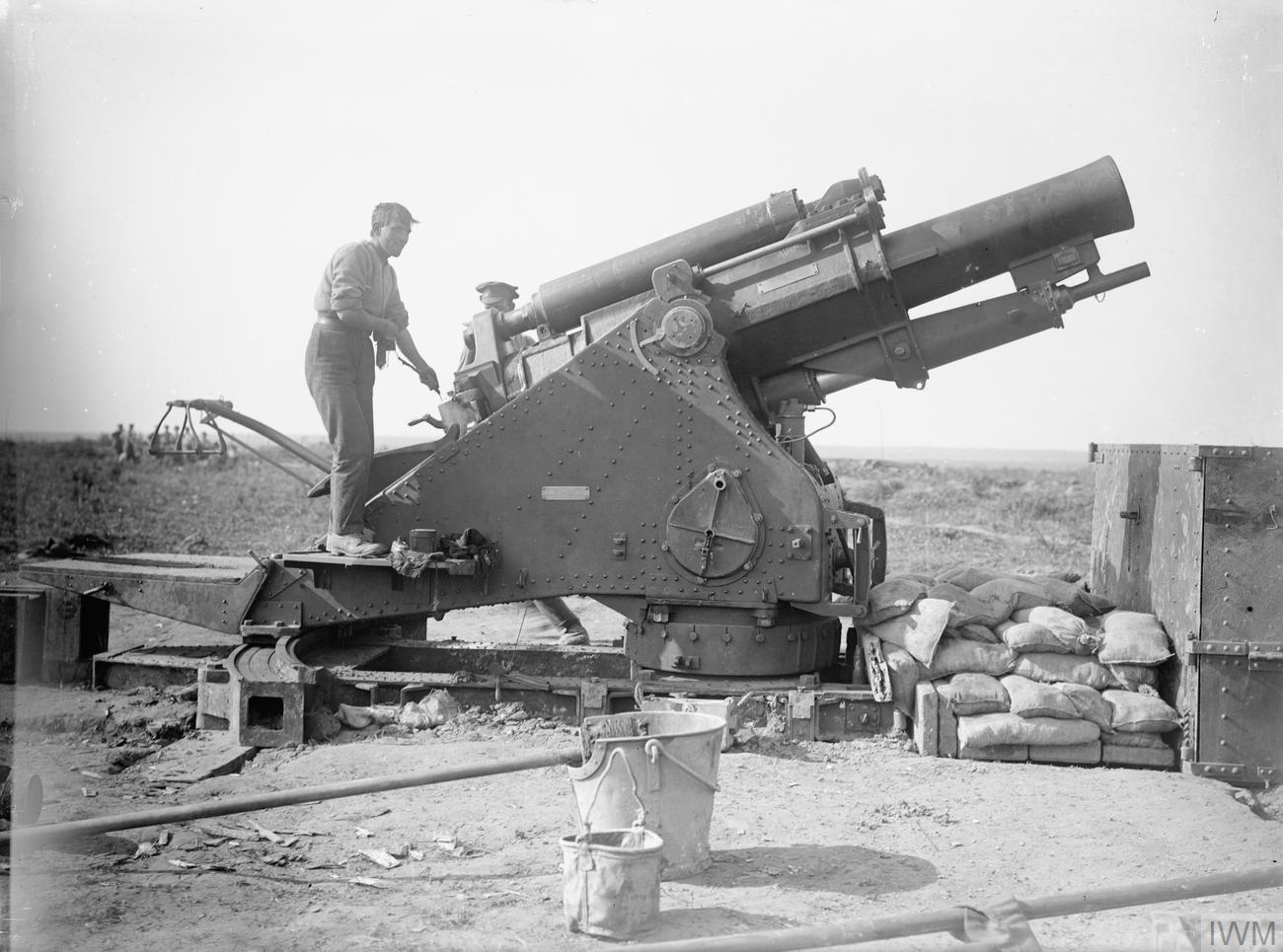
9.2-inch howitzer in action on the Somme, 1916.

=== Gommecourt ===
19th HAG was assigned to support VII Corps' Attack on the Gommecourt Salient in the forthcoming 'Big Push' (the Battle of the Somme). Its main role was to use the high-angle fire of its howitzers to bombard German trenches and strongpoints facing 56th (1st London) Division's attack frontage on the south face of the salient. 91st SB's position north-west of the salient had been chosen to bear on these trenches from the rear and also on nearby battery positions. On 12 June the battery registered all four guns on a point in the German trenches directed by the observation post (OP) codenamed 'Wagram'. One shell fell exactly on an important trench junction, and next day the gunners could see that the enemy had erected an ironic bull's-eye target on this spot. The following days were spent improving the battery positions and dumping ammunition at the guns, registering targets and carrying out counter-battery (CB) fire against hostile batteries with aircraft observation.

VII Corps' bombardment plan for the operation was issued on 16 June. It was spread over five days, designated U, V, W, X and Y, before the attack on Z Day. The heavy howitzers joined in the bombardment on 25 June (V Day). The planned rate of fire was 50 rounds per gun on V to X days, then 70 rounds on Y day. Ammunition for the modern howitzers like the 9.2-inch was in short supply, and had to be carefully rationed during the preliminary bombardment. At all times during daylight, No 8 Squadron, Royal Flying Corps (RFC) had a BE2c observation aircraft in the air spotting fall of shot for 19th HAG's batteries. Among the targets for 91st SB were 'Nameless Farm' and 'Farmyard Strongpoint', the strongpoints at Gommecourt Cemetery and 'The Maze', the 'Exe' 'Ems' and 'Epte' communication trenches, and the line of trenches ('Mess', 'Mere', "Meed' and 'Meet') running along the top of the ridge into Rossignol Wood. Although 19th HAG was the designated bombardment group and 48th HAG was the CB group, 91st SB carried out a number of CB shoots directed by No 8 Sqn, its 9.2-inch shells supplementing the lighter 60-pounders of 48th HAG. On V Day it fired 15 shells at a battery spotted just south of Biez Wood, the second of which caused a large explosion. It was then called up by an RFC Kite balloon to fire on one of the battery positions around Le Quesnoy Farm. It fired 25 rounds but their fall was unobserved. On W Day (26 June) 91st SB recorded three excellent CB shoots, optimistically claiming three batteries destroyed. Poor weather hindered observation on X Day, but 91st SB joined in with 48th HAG in a six-minute 'sweep' of the area south from Adinfer Wood to Le Quesnoy Farm. On 28 June No 2 gun suffered a premature explosion of a faulty shell in the bore of the gun. This caused a large bulge in the barrel and forced out the sides of the cradle. Both gun and carriage had to be condemned, but luckily no-one was injured. The battery took over a replacement gun from 90th SB. VII Corps ordered an all-out bombardment of enemy battery positions on Y Day, but because of bad weather this had to be done 'off the map' without direct observation. 91st SB fired 40 rounds on the batteries south of Le Quesnoy Farm, but this effort was soon called off. Because of the poor weather the attack was postponed for two days, and the additional days (Y1 and Y2) were used for further bombardment, though limited by shell supply. On Y1 91st SB put down a fast and accurate 'strafe' on 'Stellung 508' east of Essarts: nine out of 16 shells were observed by the RFC to hit the target. It contributed another 30 rounds of CB fire on Y2.

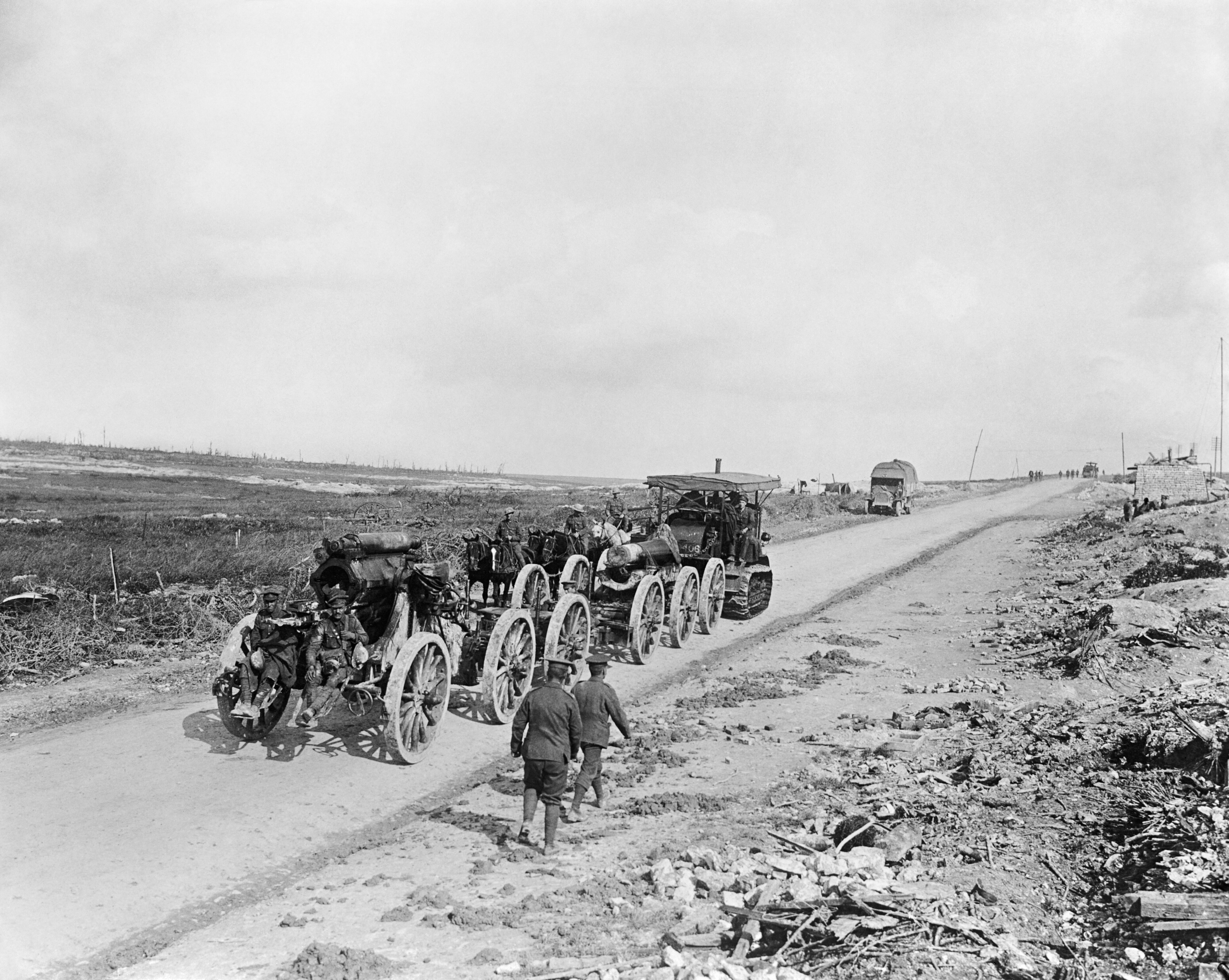
A Holt caterpillar tractor hauling a 9.2-inch howitzer on the Somme.

A final bombardment began at 06.25 on Z Day (1 July), with 65 minutes of intense fire (2 rounds per gun per minute) before H Hour at 07.30, with 91st SB firing at the trenches south of Gommecourt. The German guns were also hammering 56th (1st L) Division's assembly trenches from 04.00 onwards, causing numerous casualties among the troops waiting to go 'over the top'. At H Hour the German artillery laid a barrage across No man's land, but the leading waves of 56th (1st L) Division had anticipated this and moved out early. They made it to the German front trenches, which they found smashed up by the heavy howitzers, though there were numerous 'dud' 9.2-inch shells lying unexploded and the deep dugouts were undamaged. They quickly secured the first two trenches, but the third, although heavily damaged was strongly manned by German riflemen and machine gunners who had been sheltering in the dugouts. The following infantry waves suffered heavy casualties from the German barrage, fired by batteries that had not been suppressed by the CB bombardments. When the assault was launched two guns of 91st SB were assigned to help 48th HAG with CB fire, but observation was poor due to smoke, and the battery expended its allocation of CB rounds by 12.45 with little result. Apart from the guns bombarding Gommecourt village and park, the rest of the guns of the HAGs lifted off the front trenches at H Hour and begun firing on the flanks of the first objective. After 15 minutes they switched to the second objective, after which they were to shift forward to cover the consolidation of that line. However, the difficulties faced by the follow-up waves of infantry meant that they could not keep up with this timetable, and reinforcements and parties carrying ammunition could not get across No man's land. 46th (North Midland) Division, attacking the north side of the salient had fared much worse, and during the afternoon 56th (1st L) Division's lodgement became untenable. By 21.30 the last surviving parties had withdrawn to their own lines. During the day 91st SB had fired 820 rounds, each shell weighing 290 pounds (130 kg).

The Gommecourt attack had only been a diversion from the main attack of the First day on the Somme, and it was not renewed after the failure on 1 July. The two sides settled down to (in the words of 19th HAG's war diary) 'the usual Trench Routine'. Third Army was not involved in any major operations for the rest of the year. 91st SB's war diary reports 'very quiet' for most of July and August, while the guns further south could be heard as the Somme offensive continued. The 9.2-inch howitzers had been badly stressed by the intense fire on 1 July and required servicing, which was done on the battery positions. Orders were issued that in future they should not be fired at a faster rate than one round per minute, and this was later amended to one round in two minutes, though Christian noted that experience showed that a rate of one round in one-and-a-half minutes could be sustained without undue strain on guns or gunners. Captain Kellie left to take command of another battery and Lt C.H.R. Scholefield was promoted to be battery captain in his place. There was little firing. On 17 August 91st SB fired 11 rounds, though 19th HAG complained about the quality of the ammunition: four shells were 'blinds' while the others burst poorly. The registration was good, however. The battery's OPs spent their time trying to locate hostile batteries. On 13 September 91st SB was ordered to send its Left Section of two guns to Sailly-au-Bois, about 5 miles (8.0 km) south of Pommier. These were in position next day. Their role was to carry out CB fire in support of a proposed attack on Thiepval Ridge as part of the ongoing offensive. Over the next two weeks the battery engaged 16 hostile batteries, usually observed by Capt Stanley-Clarke of No 12 Squadron, RFC. The results were usually good: on 23 September the guns took a German battery in enfilade with 60 rounds, described by Stanley-Clarke as a 'topping shoot', the air photographs of which were later used at artillery schools. On 27 September while the attack on Thiepval was in progress each gun of the section took on a different battery at the same time. Left Section returned to Pommier on the night of 1 October; in the meantime Right Section had also carried out five CB shoots.

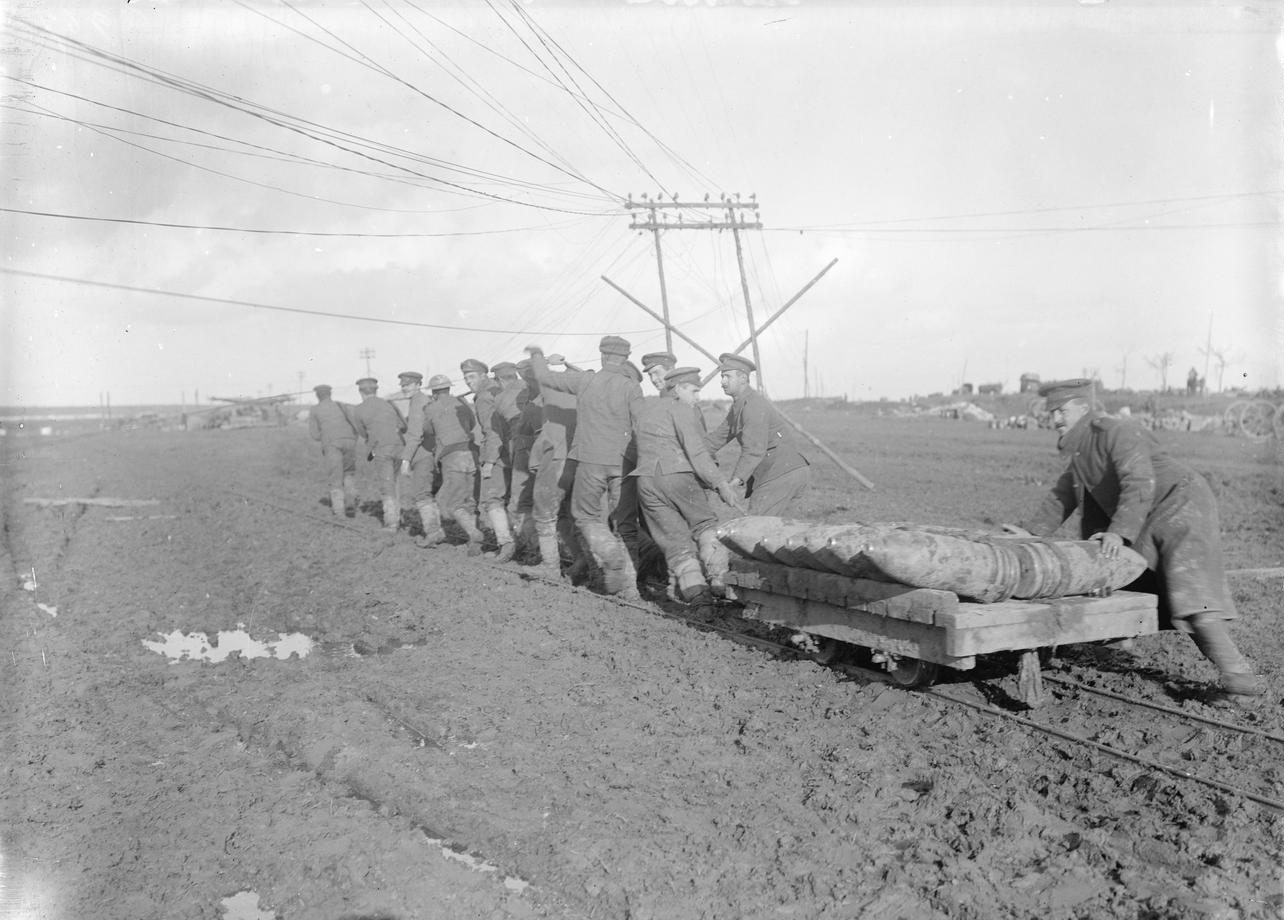
Gunners hauling ammunition up to the guns, Somme.

=== Beaumont-Hamel ===
On 17 October 91st SB was transferred to 1st HAG with Reserve Army. The guns were pulled out during the night of 16/17 October in knee-deep mud and moved into position at Mailly-Maillet on 17/18 October. The drawback to the site was that ammunition lorries could get no closer than 700 yards (640 m) from the guns, and so the battery had to construct and operate a Decauville Railway to bring up the shells through the mud. The battery fired its first registration rounds on 20 October. Following the capture of Thiepval Ridge, Reserve Army (renamed Fifth Army on 30 October) was carrying out a series of operations known as the Battle of the Ancre Heights and was planning an attack on the fortified village of Beaumont-Hamel that had resisted capture on 1 July. With the reinforcements it had been sent, Fifth Army had a greater weight of artillery than was available on 1 July. 91st SB was tasked with shelling trenches and strongpoints around Beaumont-Hamel, including 'Munich Trench', 'Beaumont Alley' and 'Puisieux Trench'. Every morning it took part in the 45-minute 'hate', when all batteries took part. Plenty of ammunition was now available, but the differences between batches, and between the muzzle velocities of the guns with varying amounts of wear, led to complex calculations for the battery commander's assistants (BCAs). On 2 November an enemy high velocity gun fired a few shells at the battery's positions, igniting a freshly-arrived dump of cartridges some 60 yards (55 m) from the guns. Around 600 cartridges were lost, but about 200 were saved. The tempo increased as the day for the attack neared: 91st SB fired 200 rounds on 11 November and 380 on 12 November.

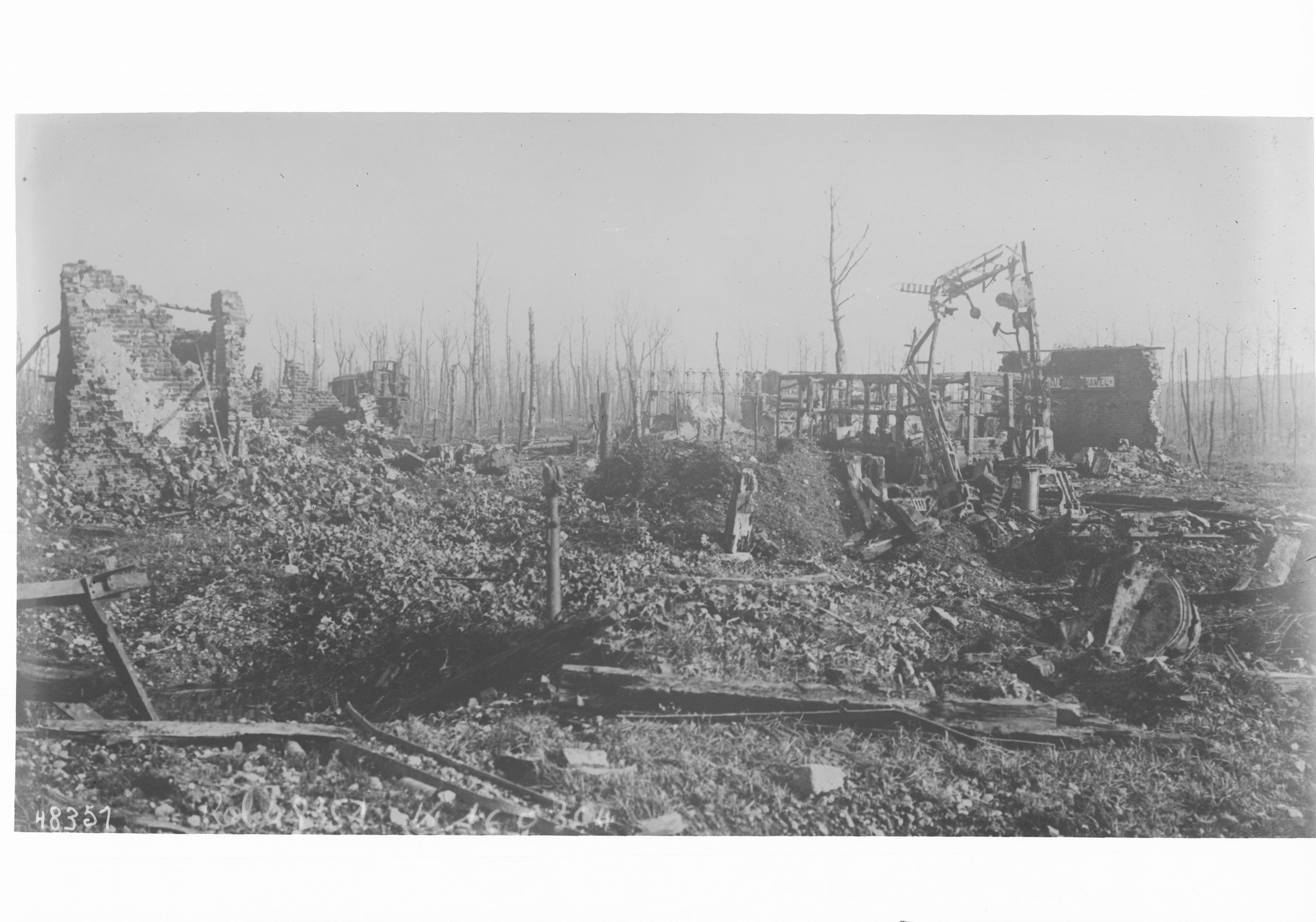
The ruins of Beaumont-Hamel, 14 November 1916.

At 05.45 (90 minutes before sunrise) on 13 November, coinciding with the artillery's routine 'hate', Fifth Army launched its attack on Beaumont-Hamel (the Battle of the Ancre). 91st SB was in action all day supporting the infantry with a series of barrages, though No 1 gun went out of action at 08.00 with broken beams of its firing platform. At noon a shell on battery headquarters at Mailly-Maillet killed the BCA and the attached RFC wireless operator. 51st (Highland) Division had assaulted Beaumont-Hamel at Zero under cover of darkness and a thick fog, and by 07.50 despite the mud they had reached the third German line (the Green line) and were dealing with pockets of resistance. Fighting went on all day and the attack on Munich Trench (the Yellow Line) never began. That night orders were given for the attack on Munich Trench to resume at 05.45 next morning. The guns continued firing throughout. Munich Trench was occupied as ordered, but had been almost obliterated by the heavy guns and the Highlanders dug a fresh position ('New Munich Trench'). By 11.00 on 14 November 91st SB had been in continuous action for over 29 hours, and the gun detachments were very tired from serving the guns and the Decauville railway. However, it remained in action all day (No 1 gun coming back into action at 11.45 on a new platform) firing at rates varying between one round per gun per minute to 10 rounds per battery per hour. The fighting continued on 15 November, with 51st (H) and 2nd Divisions occupying the abandoned line of Munich Trench but only a few individuals being able to push on to 'Frankfurt Trench' beyond. 91st SB continued firing, but during the afternoon it was joined by a 30-strong infantry fatigue party to help move ammunition. The battery got a short break at 15.25 on 16 November, having been in continuous action for 87 hours 40 minutes. The guns continued firing on 17 November, with only two 30-minute breaks, until 16.00 when the breechblock of No 2 gun blew out, killing the gun No 1 and two other gunners and wounding the section commander. (Note: A month later, after the damaged breechblock had been replaced, the shell lodged halfway up the bore had to be forced out by firing increasingly large charges until it was projected into a nearby hillside. No 2 gun remained in use for a long time afterwards.) Fifth Army continued operations towards the wreck of Munich Trench and Frankfurt Trench in sleet and rain. The bombardment went on: on 19 November Nos 4 and 1 guns were put out of action with broken side beams, though No 3 continued firing and Nos 2 and 4 were back in action at 23.00. Infantry operations were closed down after 19 November, but 91st SB continued firing at a slow rate until 08.00 on 22 November, when No 3 suffered broken side beams, having been firing for over 10 days. 'Cease firing' was ordered at 16.00 on 22 November, greeted by feeble cheers from the exhausted gunners.

The Battle of the Ancre proved to be the last significant operation of the Somme Offensive. Apart from short bombardments east of Munich Trench (23 November) and on Puisieux (26 November), the rest of the month was quiet for 91st SB. During December its activity was confined to retaliation on enemy-held villages and occasionally 'crumping' trenches. Particular attention was paid to Munich Trench, though infantry patrols could no longer even locate it. From 13 to 24 December a working party consisting of most of the battery was sent to work on a cable trench to an OP on the 'Schwaben Redoubt'. Fifth Army resumed Operations on the Ancre in January 1917 with a view to finally clearing the Beaumont-Hamel spur. From 5 to 10 January 1917 91st SB fired on the site of Munich Trench, which was attacked at dawn on 11 January, though the infantry could not locate it and dug in roughly where it had been. On 16–18 January 91st SB bombarded 'Glory Lane' and enemy HQs in support of a minor operation by 32nd Division that finally pushed over the crest of the Beaumont-Hamel Spur and gave Fifth Army observation over the German rear areas. On 10 February the battery began work on new gun positions in Station Road, Beaumont-Hamel, but it never occupied them: on 15 February the battery was withdrawn for rest at Drucat near Abbeville. However, it still had to find working parties for the new gun positions, and the small equipment guard on the guns still had to fire them in response to calls.

=== Arras ===
While 91st SB was at rest the Germans began their planned retreat to the Hindenburg Line (Operation Alberich). By 21 March they were 20 miles away from 1st HAG's positions and 91st SB was ordered to send Right Section away to Arras to join Third Army. It arrived on 24 March and next day was attached to 83rd HAG with XVII Corps. The guns were mounted in St Catherine, a suburb of Arras; Right Section arrived from Mailly-Maillet on 30 March and mounted their guns by 2 April. The OPs were in a house on the east edge of Arras and in the Seminary. Third Army was preparing a new offensive in front of Arras and 4 April was V Day for the bombardment, with all the siege batteries of 83rd HAG engaged; 91st SB fired one unobserved CB shoot and seven on strongpoints with forward observation officers (FOOs). On W Day it fired 100 rounds on a hostile battery with air observation and 48 on another unobserved. That day an enemy gas shell exploded in the battery office and all the staff NCOs were evacuated to hospital, one gunner later dying from gas poisoning. On X Day the battery carried out some barbed wire cutting and took on machine gun emplacements. The attack being delayed for 24 hours an additional day (Q Day) was inserted into the bombardment programme on 7 April. 91st SB took the opportunity to calibrate its guns with some new propellant that had been supplied, which was found to give much lower muzzle velocities than allowed for by the range tables. The programme recommenced with Y Day (8 April), 91st SB engaging a hostile battery with 100 rounds and bombarding six strongpoints. Zero Hour on Z Day (9 April) was at 05.30, and the infantry went over the top. While First Army with Canadian Corps was to take the high ground of Vimy Ridge, XVII Corps was tasked with capturing the southern end of the ridge and the low ground down to the River Scarpe. The corps' objectives were designated the Black Line (the German front system of four trenches), the Blue Line (mostly a single trench) and the Brown Line or Pont du Jour line (which the Germans had dug during the winter on the reverse slope of Vimy Ridge); a Green Line beyond was designated for possible exploitation. XVII Corps' success was dependent upon the Canadians seizing the high point of Thélus, which would otherwise enfilade the corps' advance. Major Christian watched with admiration as the nearest Canadian troops stormed the village of Thélus. As a result, 34th Division immediately in front of 83rd HAG was able to reach the Brown Line including the commanding height of Pont du Jour Farm on the right, but its left hand brigade was held up. 91st SB's signal sergeant, Sgt Green, had been sent forward with the infantry to lay a signal line for an OP to be established in Point du Jour Farm. On his way he came upon an abandoned German 4.2-inch (105 mm) howitzer. He helped two RGA officers to turn this gun onto the retreating Germans 'who offered an excellent target at a very short range over the open sights'. They fired about 30 rounds 'with excellent effect' before a German 5.9-inch (150 mm) battery drove them away from the gun.

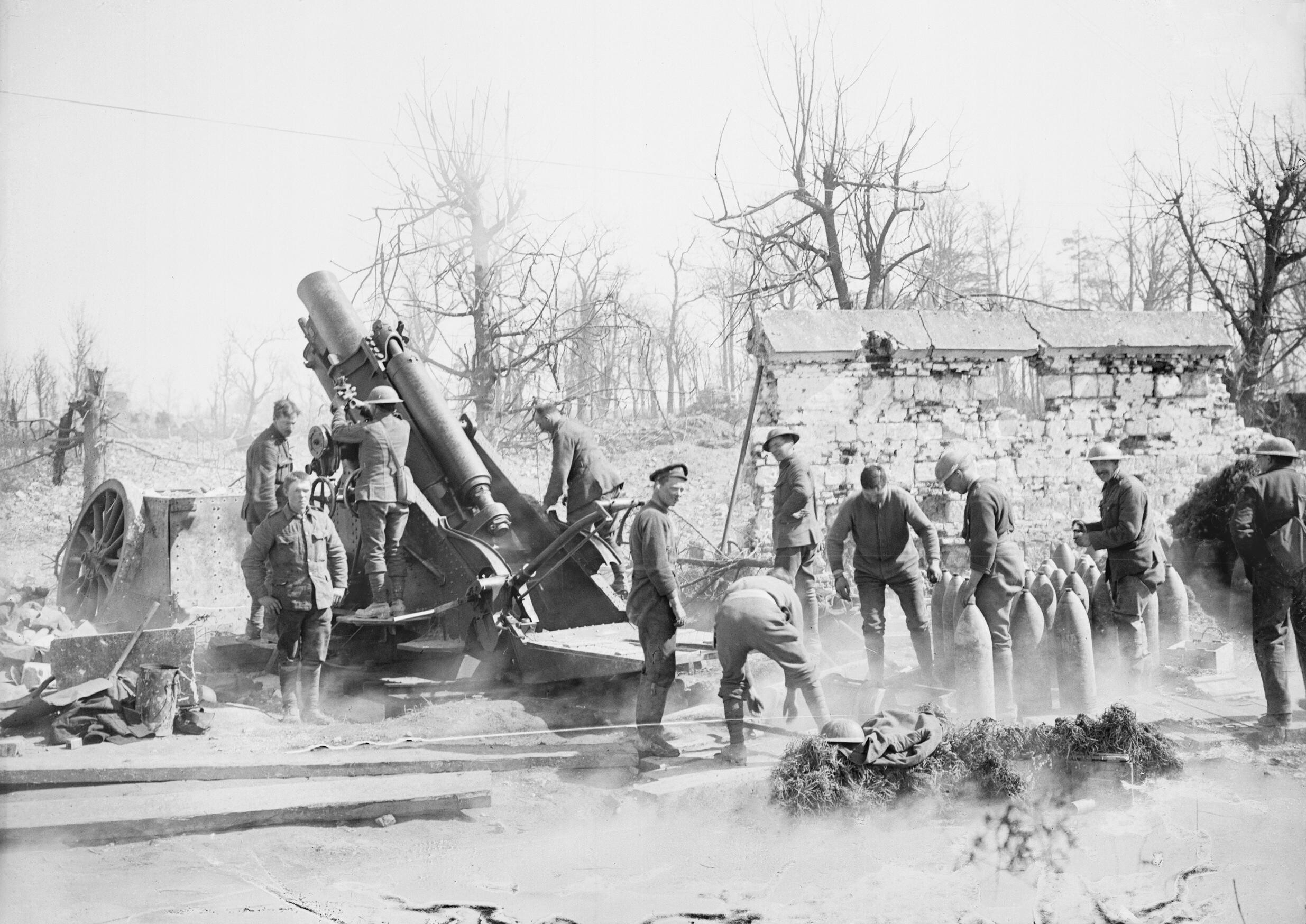
9.2-inch howitzer in action during the Battle of Arras, April 1917.

91st SB had little to do over the following days, as 83rd HAG fired a few shells on Gavrelle and Rœux, and on newly established German batteries; there was no danger of a counter-attack. The battery was dismounted and pulled out on 14 April to move forward by sections. On 16 April Left Section advanced to Roclincourt to support XIII Corps, which was being inserted between XVII and Canadian Corps, being joined two days later by Right Section. On 19 April the battery silenced a hostile battery with visual observation and shelled Gavrelle. On 20–22 April it shelled trenches, then on 23 April it took part in the protection barrage for the attack and capture of Gavrelle by 63rd (Royal Naval) Division. For this operation the battery had been ordered to get a couple of guns into position north of the Bailleul–Arras road, an advance of about 2 miles (3.2 km) over shell-pitted roads impassable to lorries. However, No 2 gun was dismounted at 22.00 on 22 April and dragged by caterpillar tractor it was in action at its new position at 05.00 on 23 April. It was joined by No 1 gun next day and by the rest of the battery on 27 April. The battery carried out a couple of CB shoots, then on 28 April it fired 600 rounds in support of the attack on Oppy during the Battle of Arleux. After a few quiet days it fired another 300 rounds at hostile batteries during the renewed attacks on Oppy on 3 May (the Third Battle of the Scarpe).

=== Messines ===
91st SB continued its CB work until 12 May. Then it was ordered to reinforce Second Army, which was concentrating artillery in the Ypres sector for a forthcoming operation (the Battle of Messines). Right Section pulled out on 13 May and went into positions on the outskirts of Neuve-Eglise on 20 May, Left Section joining it a couple of days later. The battery came under 11th HAG with II ANZAC Corps, and opened fire on the fortified village of Messines and nearby trenches with visual observation on 23 and 24 May. 49th HAG took over from 11th HAG on 24 May, and the battery remained with this group for several months. 91st SB continued firing on trench targets and on the village of Wytschaete, then switched to CB targets from 5 June, some with air observation. Second Army's artillery plan emphasised CB fire, and simulated attacks were made to induce the enemy to reveal his hidden batteries: over 200 hostile battery positions were intensively shelled during two days of concentrated CB fire prior to Z Day. British artillery fire died away about 02.40 on the morning of 7 June (Z Day). Before dawn, at 03.10, the surprise element of the plan was revealed: the simultaneous explosion of 19 huge mines dug under the ridge, which blew the German front line system to bits before the infantry advanced. II Anzac Corps had as its objectives the southern end of the Messines–Wytschaete Ridge and Messines village. Its units crushed the remaining resistance and took all their objectives. The results of the limited attack were spectacular all along the front, with the whole ridge being captured. During the day 91st SB fired 'many hundreds of rounds' from 03.10 to 19.50, mostly on hostile batteries. After the battle, the battery moved forward to Wulverghem, close to the old British front line, and began firing on new targets with aircraft and balloon observation.

=== Flanders ===
49th HAG was now moved further north to join XV Corps in Fourth Army for a projected offensive along the Belgian coast. 91st SB pulled out its guns on 24 June and after three days' rest moved to La Panne, where the guns were positioned at Groote Westhoff Farm on the night of 4/5 July. The OP was in a ruined house in Pervyse, just behind the Belgian-held front line. Belgian OPs had already registered most of the hostile batteries from their flashes, and the battery had observation from No 52 Squadron, RFC, for its registration shoots, otherwise the battery was to remain silent. The plan had been for Fourth Army to attack at Nieuport in about mid-July in conjunction with a naval landing and an offensive at Ypres. However, the Germans put in a spoiling attack at Nieuport on 10 July, and 91st SB was called on to neutralise two enemy batteries, coming under heavy retaliatory fire itself, with casualties and damage to equipment. In such flat country there was no cover for the guns, whose flashes could be easily seen, especially when firing at high elevation. This continued over the following days, and on 14 July all four guns were put out of action, mainly with damage to their 'earth boxes', platforms and transporter carriages: the battery position was reduced to 'a mass of muddy shell holes'. By dawn on 15 July the battery had Nos 2 and 4 guns repaired; they were moved 100 yards (91 m) forward and began firing at dawn on 17 July. The battery also spent three days re-laying its Decauville railway to bring up ammunition, which was dispersed in small dumps in case of hostile shellfire. The men's accommodation was also dispersed in small groups away from the gun positions. On 21 July a lorry full of shells was blown up and some cartridges ignited on the battery's position. On 30 July both guns were put out of action again with damaged carriages. The battery got two guns back in action by 2 August, but did not fire until 5 August. By 17 August Nos 3 & 4 guns had been repaired, and were in a new widely spaced position (Left Section) 0.25 miles (0.40 km) south-east of the main battery position. These guns were calibrated and registered with the help of a Field Survey Section of the Royal Engineers. Exchanges of CB and harassing fire (HF) with enemy batteries continued until 26 August when the gunners were withdrawn to XV Corps' Rest Camp, leaving a small guard on the guns. Returning to the line at the beginning of September, 91st SB carried out concentrated bombardments on hostile batteries. On 5 September Right Section was heavily shelled, No 1 gun being damaged and the position rendered unfit. It took a few days to move the guns to join Left Section in its new position. Poor weather for observation meant that there was little activity for the rest of the month, but there was a resurgence in October, with the battery carrying out numerous shoots; on 11 and 15 October it was heavily shelled, a gun being put out of action on each occasion. 49th HAG's positions were also subjected to regular night bombing raids by German aircraft. The slow progress of the Ypres offensive meant that the coastal operation was repeatedly postponed, though as late as 21 September it was still considered a possibility. It was not finally cancelled until 14 October, when the fighting at Ypres was bogged down in the First Battle of Passchendaele. Nevertheless, the artillery exchanges continued. At the end of October it was decided that the Belgian army would attack a number of German strongpoints (fortified farms) in the flooded valley of the River Yser, for which 91st SB provided bombardments on 1–9 November. Mutual CB and HF shoots continued for the rest of November whenever weather permitted observation. Finally, on 1 December the battery was ordered to move out. Major Christian calculated that during the 5 months the battery had spent on the coast it had fired 12,630 rounds and received 5355 in retaliation, resulting in its guns being put out of action on 15 occasions, though its only casualties were 1 killed and 1 wounded. He claimed that it had destroyed 50 hostile gun pits, 5 outposts and 2 OPs.

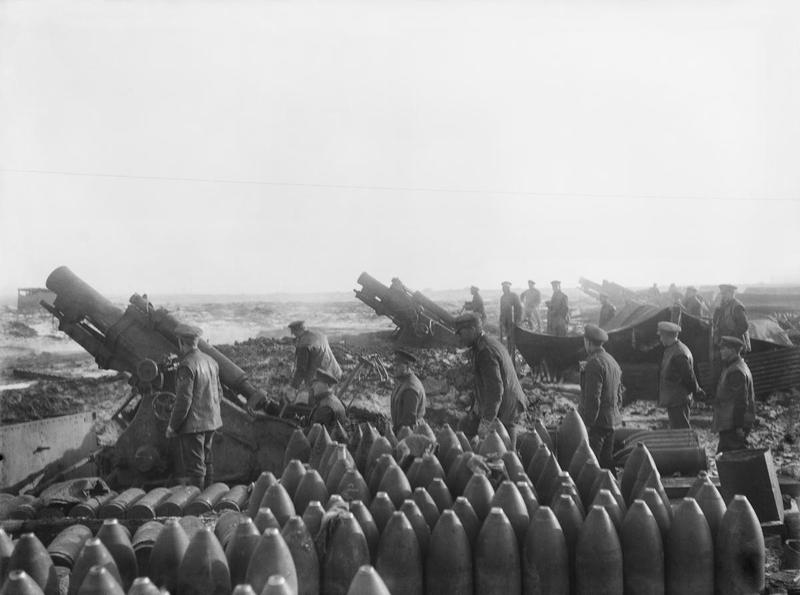
A battery of 9.2-inch howitzers in action.

=== Winter 1917–18 ===
The battery emptied its guns on 2 December and pulled out. It arrived at Arques, near Saint-Omer, next day and began two weeks of rest and training under 98th HAG. On 18 December 91st SB was brought up to a strength of 6 howitzers when a section (2 officers and 70 ORs, together with 29 ASC ORs) joined from the experienced 183rd SB, (Note: 183rd Siege Battery had been formed on 23 June 1916 from units in the Portland garrison, probably including Territorials of the Dorsetshire RGA. It had served with Third Army during the Battle of Arras.) which was being broken up and reconstituted with lighter howitzers (the rest of its 9.2s went to 93rd SB). Next day the enlarged battery was posted to 76th HAG. At this time HAGs were being converted into permanent RGA brigades, and 91st SB remained with 76th Bde for the rest of the war. 76th Brigade was with Fifth Army on the extreme right of the BEF, and the battery had to travel almost the whole length of the front to join. Leaving its original guns in the workshops, it entrained 183rd's guns and the caterpillar tractors at Saint Omer (the lorries went by road) and travelled to Péronne. On 24 December the battery moved by road to Jeancourt, where it worked on new gun positions and shelters for the men. Nos 5 & 6 guns were emplaced by 27 December, but they did not begin firing until 10 January, when they registered on the villages of Bellicourt and Nauroy. Little then happened until the end of the month, when a few CB shoots were carried out. On 3 February six new 9.2-inch Mark II howitzers arrived at Péronne to be issued to the battery. These had a range of 13,200 yards (12,100 m) instead of the 10,200 yards (9,300 m) of the old Mark I guns. Nos 1–4 guns were emplaced at Vendelles by 16 February, while the two old guns at Jeancourt fired a few tasks. When the new guns were registered they were found to be very accurate. On 25 February the Vendelles (rear) section destroyed a length of road that would be vital to the enemy when (as was expected) they launched their Spring Offensive. Canal bridges and likely assembly areas were also targeted for the same reason. Meanwhile, CB shoots continued: on 5 March the rear section fired on a battery that had been spotted hidden behind a house in Bellenglise. Using the house as a ranging point the battery fired 200 rounds, and air photographs showed the battery position demolished. 91st SB also fired to cover raids by the infantry.

=== Spring Offensive ===
At 04.40 on 21 March the enemy began a bombardment of the whole of Fifth Army's front. XIX Corps HQ, which had taken over the Péronne sector on 10 March, had some 130 heavy and siege guns at its disposal to cover some 12,000 yards (11,000 m) of front. All seven of 76th Bde's batteries immediately came under fire by at least three hostile batteries each (91st SB estimated that four or five were targeting it), using a high proportion of gas shell. The first salvo on 91st SB blew up the cartridges at No 4 gun. Despite the attempts to neutralise them, most of the British batteries got into action firing on their 'counter-preparation' lines as best they could in the fog and darkness. Most of the communication lines were cut at the outset, so runners had to be used. 91st SB lost contact with its forward section of two guns and the OP. In the absence of orders from brigade HQ, Maj Christian switched from the initial SOS lines to firing concentrations on targets selected to hold up the enemy infantry. 91st SB soon had to reduce its rate of fire as ammunition ran short, with no hope of replenishment because the road leading to the gun positions was under a heavy barrage. Casualties also started to mount. By 11.00 German infantry had penetrated XIX Corps' Forward Zone and was beginning to attack the uncompleted Battle Zone behind. Jeancourt was a defended locality within this zone, and it became necessary to withdraw 76th Bde's batteries. The rear section of 91st SB began dismounting its four guns, but because of casualties this had to be done one gun at a time. As the fog began to clear they came under air attack with bombs and machine gun fire, to which the gunners replied with Lewis guns and rifles. The caterpillar tractors arrived in mid-afternoon, having gone across country to avoid the interdicted road. The rear section moved off at 02.00 on 22 March, by which time there were only 2 officers and 19 ORs at the guns who were not wounded or overcome by gas. While the exhausted gunners went to Bernes, a village about 2 miles (3.2 km) back, the guns were towed back to a planned rear position. The ASC drivers suffered casualties during this operation, which was carried out on near-impassable roads while under bombing and shellfire. On arrival at the designated position the drivers were ordered to continue their retirement, and about 10.00 on 23 March they reached the village of Misery. Here they rejoined the gunners from Bernes and the survivors of the forward section. This isolated section had begun firing on the morning of 21 March, but had to cease fire at 11.30 when the last of their cartridges were blown up by shellfire. By 16.40 retreating infantry and field guns of XIX Corps were passing their position, and with no tractors to remove the guns they were destroyed. The gunners of the forward section retired to the rear gun position where they unloaded ammunition, then went back to Athies where 76th Bde had been ordered to retreat. They then rejoined the battery at Misery. 91st SB's casualties on 21 March had been 39 officers and ORs evacuated wounded or gassed, by far its highest loss of the war.

91st SB still had four guns, but without platforms, earth boxes and other equipment they were useless. From Misery the battery went back to Proyart on 24 March, where Maj Christian was ordered to form a 'Reorganisation Brigade' at Marcelcave to re-equip and bring up to strength eight shattered batteries. This was done over the next two weeks, but the only one of the batteries that could not be re-equipped was 91st SB because of a shortage of spare parts for Mk II 9.2-inch howitzers. 91st SB's gunners were employed on fatigues at Fifth Army Gun Park and assisting the infantry in digging new defences, and as relief crews for other siege batteries of XIX Corps still in the line. The battery was moved from place to place, the gunners working at various ammunition dumps under III Corps' Heavy Artillery, which had taken over from XIX Corps HA (the sector was now under Fourth Army).

=== Albert front ===
Finally, on 16 May 91st SB was able to draw two new platforms from Ordnance stores, and two days later two more platforms and two new guns. By now 76th Bde HQ was at Contay, attached to 18th (Eastern) Division, and its re-equipped batteries were coming back into action. On 24 May Nos 1 & 2 guns of 91st SB were in action in a valley west of Albert, carrying out shoots with balloon observation. On 6 June Nos 3 & 4 guns were mounted near Bresle as Forward Section, with Nos 1 & 2 becoming Centre Section. The battery began CB shoots observed by the Field Survey Section. In addition the heavy artillery had adopted a tactic of 'concentration shoots' whereby all the batteries of the brigade simultaneously opened rapid fire for 3 minutes on selected targets such as bridges and villages. Eight or 10 such shoots were carried out each day in addition to the normal trench warfare firing. In 91st SB most of the concentrations were fired by Centre Section, while CB shoots with aircraft observation were done by the Forward Section, which received considerable retaliatory fire: on 2 July No 3 gun was moved back about 300 yards (270 m) into the cover of Bresle Wood. By now the last two guns had been mounted near Contay. This position was far in the rear with the role of covering the other two sections in the event of another German breakthrough (the Germans were still attacking the French Army at this time). This Rear Section remained silent, but the gun detachments were rotated between the three sections every two weeks. In late June the BEF began to go over to the offensive. On 30 June 91st SB fired three neutralising and one destructive CB shoot in support of an attack by the neighbouring corps on the left. Early on 4 July Australian Corps on the right carried out a successful attack (the Battle of Hamel), which 91st SB supported with CB fire, and also fired to help break up the German counter-attack. On 13 July the infantry divisional commander pointed out a suspected concentration of German tanks to which 76th Bde responded with fire including 91st SB (the artillery FOO was of the opinion that these 'tanks' were an abandoned British caterpillar tractor and a natural mound). On 18 July 91st SB carried out an experimental 'switch shoot', shifting rapidly from one hostile battery to another to catch them out: the first three salvoes were on or close to the targets, but the fourth was 100 yards (91 m) short. On 25 July the battery supported a daylight raid by 58th (2/1st London) Division. Through July the ammunition expenditure on concentrations increased as Fourth Army prepared for a major offensive. On 26 July 91st SB moved the two guns of Centre Section up to Bresle Wood alongside Forward Section and on 4 August the silent section moved up to Buire, as III Corps HA concentrated its guns forward. On 3 August the Germans carried out a small withdrawal on the Albert front in anticipation of the British offensive. Early on 6 August they made a small spoiling attack on III and Australian Corps, to which 76th Bde's batteries responded with CB fire, repeated when the Australians counter-attacked next day.

=== Hundred Days Offensive ===
Fourth Army's offensive was launched on 8 August (the Battle of Amiens). III Corps' role was to make a short advance to protect the left flank of Australian Corps. The three RGA brigades were temporarily reorganised into groups for this operation, with all the CB batteries in C1 Sub-Group. The batteries completed all their allotted tasks during the day, 91st SB's four guns at Bresle firing 1000 rounds and the two at Buire firing 380, neutralising hostile batteries. It was reported that many of the pinned batteries were unable to get their guns away before the attacking infantry arrived. The corps had not achieved all its objectives on 8 August, so 91st SB fired again during follow-up attacks on the afternoon of 9 August, and responded to calls as the advance continued. On 11 August Nos 3 & 4 guns at Bresle dismounted to move forward to Treux Chateau, where they came back into action of 13 August and were joined later by Nos 1 & 2. The sections continued CB, HF and concentration shoots until 22 August, when III Corps launched a fresh attack (the Battle of Albert), supported by the siege batteries. The infantry succeeded in crossing the Ancre and capturing Albert, but were pushed back from their final objective, so the attack was continued next day. During the day Nos 1 & 2 guns of 91st SB moved up from Treux to Dernancourt, but No 4 gun was condemned with a cracked barrel. On 24 August the Buire section fired in support of an attack, and then dismounted their guns, coming into action next day near Bécourt, where their positions were surrounded by destroyed guns and ammunition of the hostile batteries at which they had been firing. An attack that afternoon was supported by both the Dernancourt and Bécourt sections, the latter firing on Maricourt. The battery was now advancing so rapidly that it could not keep all its guns in action and had to leap-frog its sections forwards, with one section in action, another waiting on its wheels behind, and the third being brought into action as close behind the front line as possible. The heavy artillery generally did not have enough caterpillars and personnel, and the 12-inch and Mark I 9.2-inch howitzer batteries had to be left behind. The Mark II 9.2s continued to advance, but there was little time to choose or prepare positions. Transport problems also meant that ammunition supply was limited during the advance. By 4 September the enemy was out of range of 91st SB, and on 6 September it moved to Bouchavesnes where the men bivouacked until bridges could be repaired to allow it advance.

91st Siege Bty moved up again on 7 September, and brought two guns into action south-west of Saulcourt on 9 September. These began harassing fire and concentrations, and were joined by two more guns on 14 September. The advance now slowed as the Germans fell back on the Hindenburg Line and strongly defended the outposts such as Épehy. German artillery was again active, and 91st SB resumed its CB shoots with aircraft observation. While a major offensive was being prepared against the Hindenburg Line it was necessary to clear these outposts, and on 18 September an attack was launched against Épehy. As was now customary, there was no preliminary bombardment: when the attack was launched at Zero (05.20) the whole of 86th Bde immediately began CB fire, 91st SB firing 750 rounds. Consequently, the hostile barrage against III Corps was very weak; Épehy was captured. On 20 September Nos 5 & 6 guns moved forward to Ste Emelie, and for the first time since the advance began 91st SB had six guns in action. When III Corps attacked again at 05.40 on 21 September 91st SB only had limited ammunition, but the Saulcourt section fired 150 rounds, and the Ste Emilie section got off a few rounds on counter-preparation and concentrations. Next day the attack went in at 05.20 and the battery got off 50 rounds. It dismounted Nos 3 & 4 guns at Saulcourt and moved them forward to be ready for Fourth Army's attack on the Hindenburg Line. This was the Battle of St Quentin Canal on 29 September, with III Corps providing the link between the Australian–US Corps and Third Army. For this operation 91st SB's Saulcourt section (Nos 1 & 2 guns) fired 150 rounds and then dismounted during the night; the Ste Emilie (Nos 5 & 6) and advanced (Nos 3 & 4) sections got off 250 rounds to neutralise enemy batteries. On 1 October the three sections began leap-frogging again, the section(s) in action firing on enemy batteries during the attacks of 1, 3, 4, 5, 8 and 9 October (the Battle of the Beaurevoir Line and the Second Battle of Cambrai). The enemy was now on the run, and there was no chance of getting the siege guns into action; leaving one section at Le Catelet the rest of the battery parked up at Harbonnières Farm on 9 October.

On 1 October XIII Corps had relieved III Corps and on 9 October the commander of XIII Corps HA ordered Maj Christian to form a 'fighting brigade' of siege batteries capable of pursuing the enemy. These were to be his own 91st SB (9.2-inch Mk II howitzers), 19th SB (8-inch howitzers) and 312th SB (6-inch guns), the latter soon being replaced by 143rd SB (9.2-inch Mk II howitzers). The formation was officially known as 'Christian's Brigade'. Captain R. Shrive took over acting command of 91st SB during this period. The German retreat halted on a line running through Le Cateau and XIII Corps closed up. On 11 October 91st SB mounted Nos 1 & 2 guns at Reumont (Right Section) and began harassing fire. Next day five officers and men of the battery, and a number of French civilians, were killed when the cellar in which they were sheltering was hit by a heavy German shell. On 14 October Nos 5 & 6 guns were mounted at Maurois (Left Section). Both sections fired in support of attacks on 17 and 18 October, but the formal attack on the German line (the Battle of the Selle) was to be made on 23 October. Christian was ordered to destroy an important railway junction east of Le Quesnoy, which would be just within range of Mk II 9.2-inch howitzers positioned immediately behind the infantry's final objective. Christian detailed 91st SB to take on this task. When the infantry attacked at 02.00 they were accompanied by a reconnaissance party from the battery and at 07.00 Centre Section, which had been waiting on its wheels, began moving up. The advance party reported that it would be possible to get through to Forest, and the section arrived there about 10.00. Further reconnaissance under shellfire showed that the crossroads beyond Forest was clear but under shellfire, and that the route up to it was under direct enemy observation and blocked by a landmine that had not yet been defused. The lorries set off at 17.00, with the intention of bringing up the guns after dark, and although the lorries got through, avoiding the mine, the gun column had been bombed and shelled while it waited, one caterpillar being knocked out and all the caterpillar drivers wounded. While other drivers were brought up, the rest of the section laid out the gun platforms and ammunition. There was not time to survey the gun positions accurately, so they had been chosen in two small clearings that at least were marked on the map. The men were then withdrawn to safety, but the shelling died away at daybreak and the guns were brought up. They were reported ready to fire at 16.00, and at dawn on 25 October the gun detachments stood by to engage the target. However, the weather was too bad for the observation aircraft, so at 11.00 the section commenced firing 200 rounds without observation, 'searching and sweeping' over the target at a range of 12,700 yards (11,600 m). An air photo taken the following day showed that the rail junction was totally destroyed.

91st SB"s sections at Reumont and Maurois were dismounted on 25 October, and the forward section fired a few round supporting a further attack on 26 October. The battery did not fire on 27 or 28 October while Nos 5 & 6 guns were positioned near Bousies as part of a large concentration of British guns. They were ready to fire on 29 October, and on 31 October the line of sight of the Forest section was changed: all these movements were hampered by wet weather and enemy shellfire. The sections fired some concentrations and harassing fire. which brought down heavy retaliation. Fourth Army launched a large-scale attack (the Battle of the Sambre) and 4 November when 91st SB opened fire at 05.45 and continued until 09.35, after which there were only a few minor calls on the guns. The German Army was in precipitate retreat, and were soon out of range. The state of the roads and bridges made it impossible for siege guns to join in the pursuit. On 7 November XIII Corps HA ordered its batteries to stand fast; 91st SB moved up to Le Cateau and was withdrawn into XIII Corps Reserve. Christian's Brigade was broken up, the batteries returning to their brigades on 10 November. Hostilities ended on 11 November when the Armistice with Germany came into force.

=== Post-Armistice ===
On 16 November, while the batteries were cleaning up and refitting, Australian Corps relieved XIII Corps and 91st SB was transferred from 76th to 47th Bde. On 30 November the brigade (without guns) moved to Beauvois, where the men carried out salvage work and undertook pre-demobilisation educational courses under 25th Division. The first men to be demobilised were a large contingent of urgently-needed coalminers, who left on 24 December. The process accelerated in early 1919 and the battery was reduced to a cadre. In May it was proposed that the cadre of 91st SB would form the basis of a new 123rd Battery in XXXI Brigade, RGA, in the postwar Regular Army. However, these plans were abandoned after the Treaty of Versailles was signed in June. By the end of June 91st SB had been reduced to an equipment guard. On 27 July this guard was sent by train to Caudry to be disbanded.

During its service from December 1915 to November 1918, 91st SB lost 3 officers and 16 ORs killed, and 5 officers and 81 ORs wounded or gassed, while 3 ORs (one wounded) died in the Spanish flu epidemic in October–November 1918.

== See also ==
Newsreel film of a 9.2-inch howitzer being fired.
