= 183rd Siege Battery, Royal Garrison Artillery =

Artillery unit of the British Army in World War I

183rd Siege Battery, RGA
- Cap Badge of the Royal Regiment of Artillery
- Active: 23 June 1916–1919
- Country: United Kingdom
- Branch: British Army
- Role: Siege Artillery
- Size: Battery
- Part of: Royal Garrison Artillery
- Engagements: Battle of the Somme; Battle of Arras; Operations on Flanders Coast; German spring offensive Hundred Days Offensive

Insignia
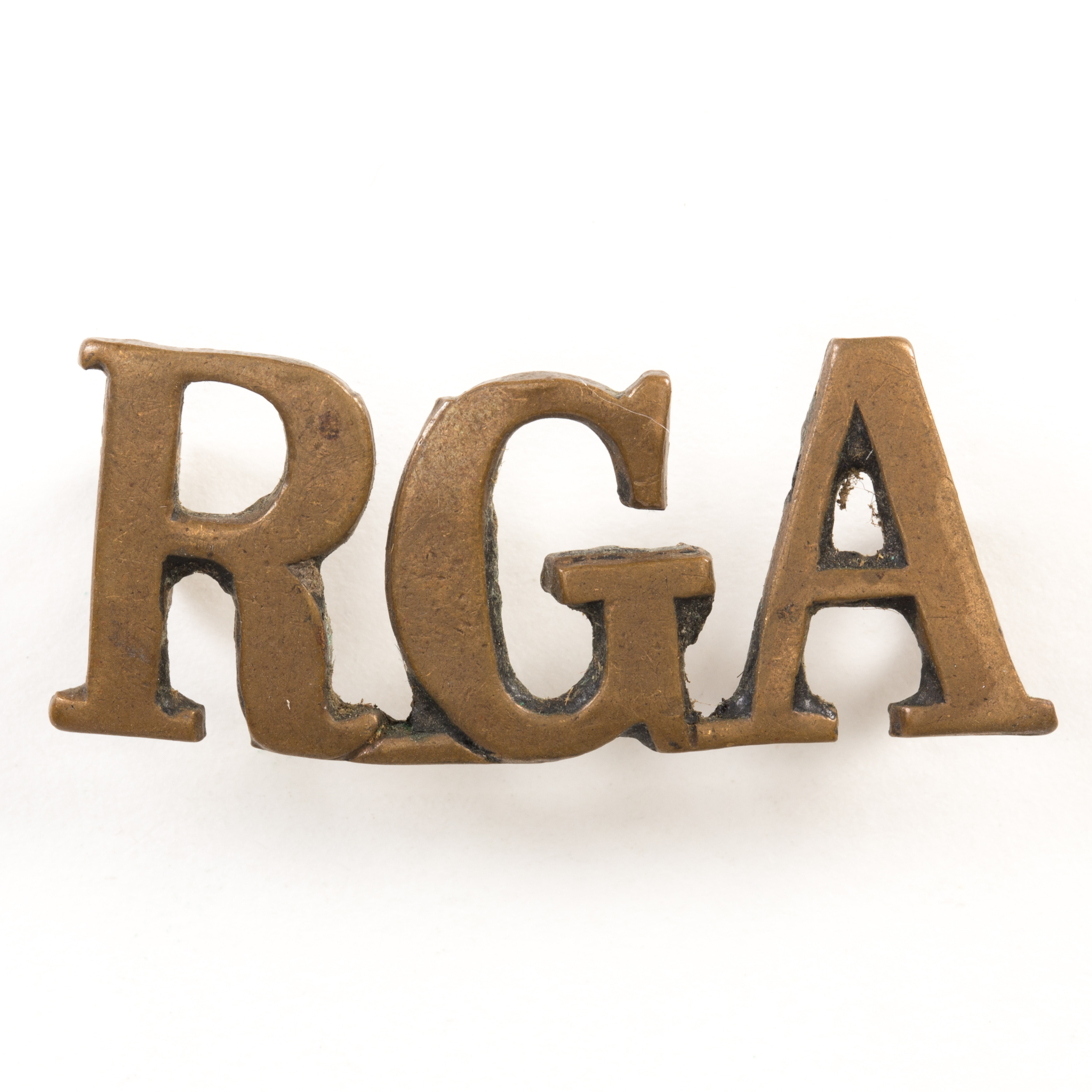
- Shoulder title

183rd Siege Battery (183rd SB) was a heavy howitzer unit of Britain's Royal Garrison Artillery (RGA) in World War I. Formed in June 1916, it served on the Western Front, at the Somme and Arras and was then stationed on the Flanders coast. In December 1917 the battery was reorganised, giving up its 9.2-inch howitzers and reforming with more mobile 6-inch howitzers. In the last year of the war it fought against the German spring offensive and participated in the final Allied Hundred Days Offensive. After the Armistice with Germany the battery served in the Allied occupation of the Rhineland until it was disbanded later in 1919.

== Mobilisation and training ==
Once the fighting on the Western Front had bogged down into Trench warfare in 1914, there was an urgent need for siege artillery, and a large number of new RGA units were hurriedly formed over the following years. The Army Council instructed that 183rd Siege Battery would be formed as a heavy howitzer battery in the Portland Garrison with effect from 23 June 1916. The new battery began to assemble at Weymouth, possibly including some Territorials of the Dorsetshire RGA who manned the Portland coastal batteries. One of the recruits training at Weymouth who was posted to the new battery in mid-July was the painter and artist Wyndham Lewis. In August the battery proceeded to Lydd to carry out its live firing course before deploying overseas. Lewis wrote to his friend Ezra Pound that 'first blood is drawn at this so called "live" camp. But it is chiefly signallers that are killed'. He was being hyperbolic, but the previous month another inexperienced battery had nearly caused multiple casualties during a training shoot. Lewis had applied for an officer's commission, and left the battery in mid-September to transfer to 196th SB (due to deploy later) while his application was being processed.

== Western Front ==
The personnel of 183rd SB embarked for the Western Front on 26 September 1916. On arrival at Boulogne next day, they took over the guns (four 9.2-inch howitzers), stores and mechanical transport waiting for 175th SB, whose personnel had been detained in the UK because of an outbreak of measles. 183rd SB was allocated to III Corps' Heavy Artillery of Fourth Army in place of 175th SB. (Note: Although the battery was assigned to a Heavy Artillery Group on 29 September 1916, the TNA record is damaged and we cannot tell which HAG the battery first joined. It transferred to 66th HAG on 21 October.)

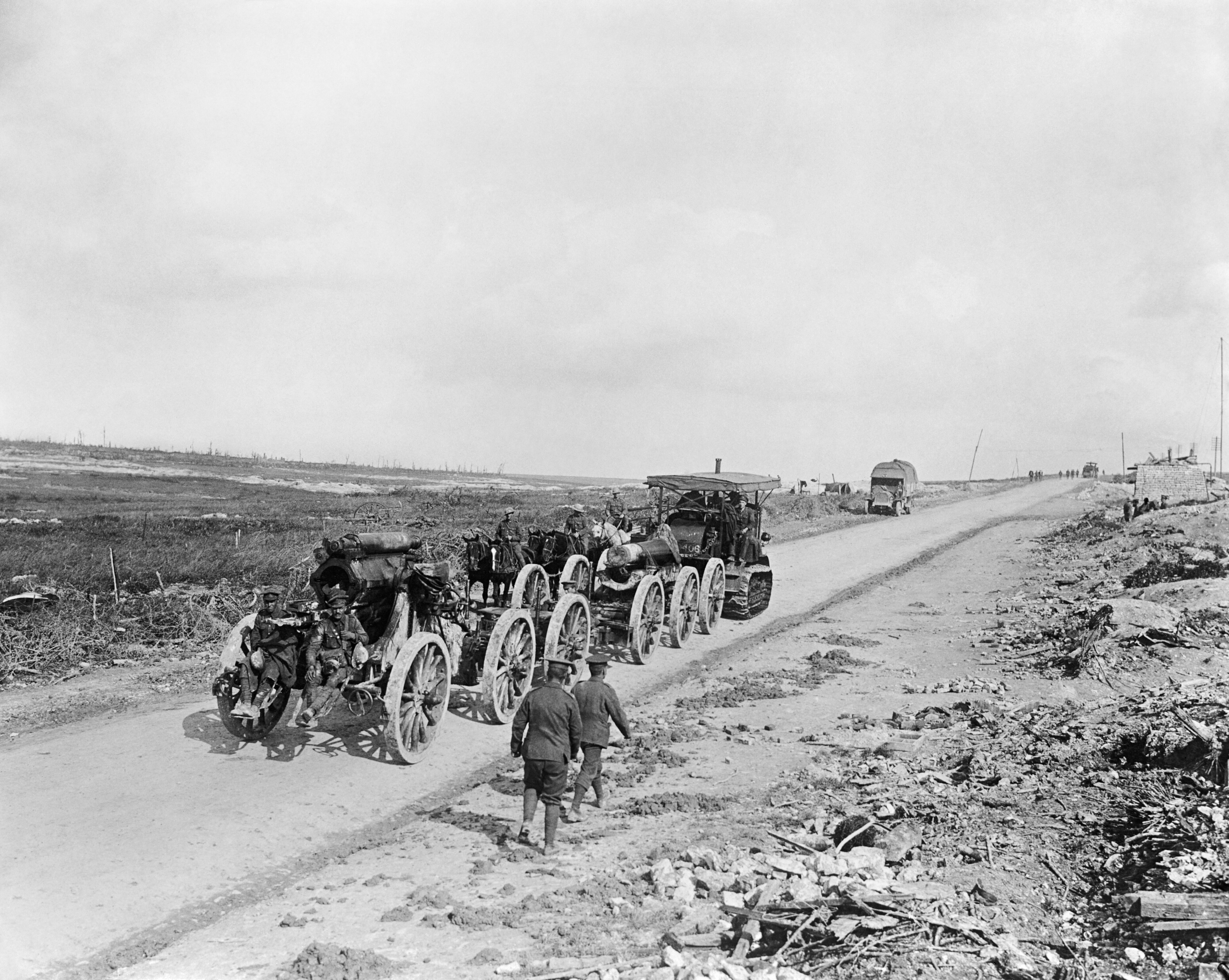
A Holt caterpillar tractor hauling a 9.2-inch howitzer on the Somme.

=== Somme ===
When 183rd SB arrived III Corps was heavily engaged in the latter stages of the Somme Offensive, including the Battle of the Transloy Ridges and the Attacks on the Butte de Warlencourt. Much of III Corps HA's firing during October and November was directed at Le Sars (captured on 7 October), at the 'Gird', 'Gallwitz' and 'Grevillers' trenches and their environs, or on counter-battery (CB) fire against the 32 hostile batteries identified in its sector. After the conclusion of the offensive 183rd SB was transferred to 30th Heavy Artillery Group (HAG) on 30 November.

183rd SB joined 3rd HAG on 28 January 1917. Its targets were much the same as in late 1916: Grevillers Redoubt, the Butte de Warlencourt and Little Wood. However, on 4 February 3rd HAG's batteries were taken out of action, and next day 183rd SB was posted back to 66th HAG. It travelled north to the Arras sector, where it joined 66th HAG on 10 February, the date that group joined VII Corps HA with Third Army.

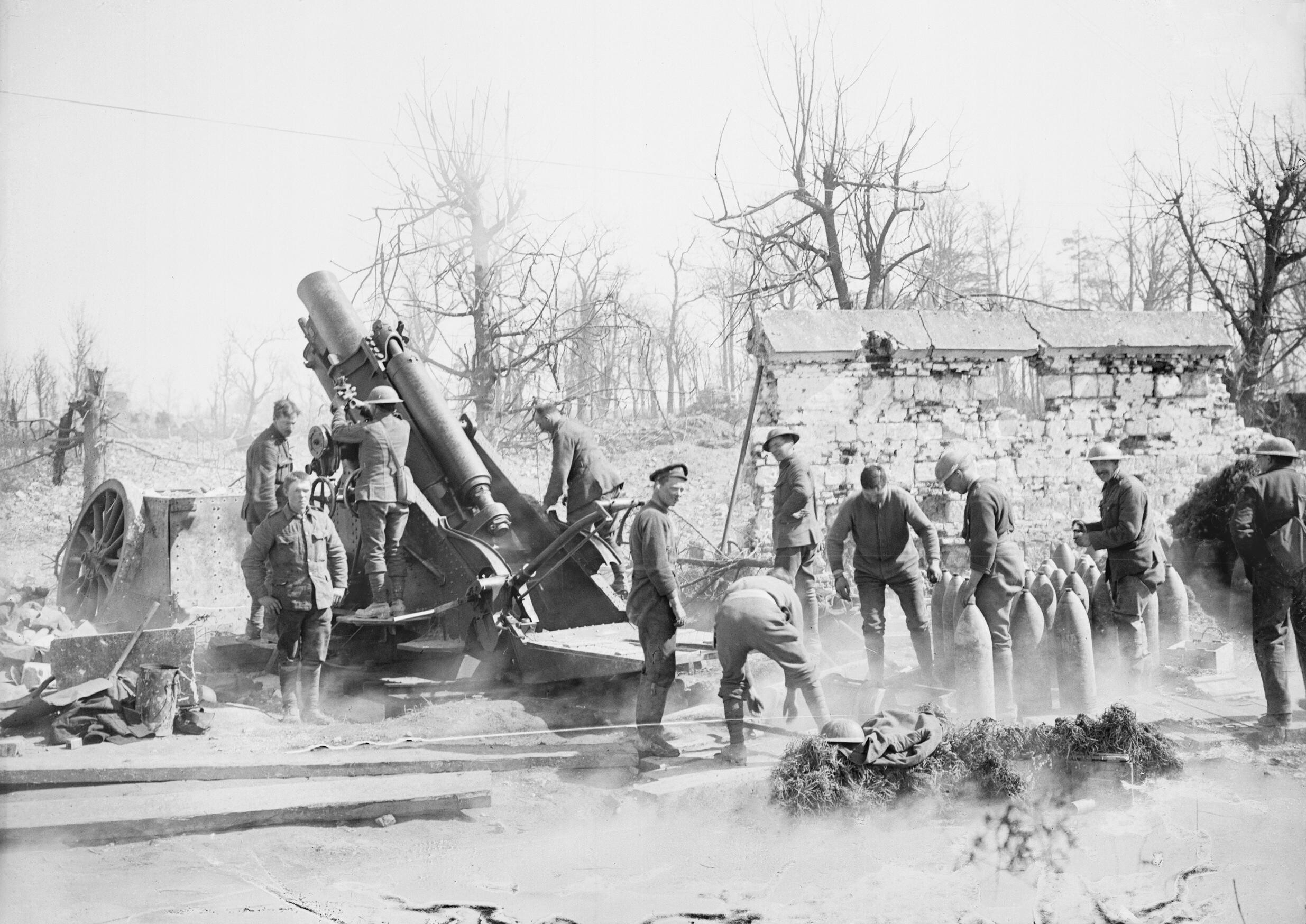
9.2-inch howitzer in action during the Battle of Arras, April 1917.

=== Arras ===
Third Army was concentrating a large number of heavy and siege batteries for the forthcoming Arras Offensive. 66th HAG was designated 'G' Group, setting up its headquarters (HQ) at Dainville, and by mid-February 183rd SB had one section of 9.2-inch howitzers in action, while the personnel of the other section formed working parties. VII Corps' arrangements for the offensive were disrupted by the German retreat to the Hindenburg Line (Operation Alberich). On 17 March VII Corps HA noticed a decrease in hostile artillery fire, and the forward observation officers (FOOs) reported villages on fire behind the German lines. Early next morning fires were seen in the German front line, and by noon it was reported that the enemy had evacuated the front system. They were followed up by British infantry who occupied Beaurains and Mercatel. At 20.00 VII Corps HA ordered a number of its batteries, including 183rd SB, to move forward to new positions. They spent the rest of the month improving these positions and registering new targets. The right of the corps was facing the strong new Hindenburg defences, and its left was now starting its attack from the old German front line, which had been its original first objective. On 31 March VII Corps HA began issuing the orders for the coming attack: there would be four days of bombardment (V, W, X and Y) before the assault went in on Z Day. Each group was assigned bombardment targets within a specified 'lane', to make it easier for FOOs to spot the fall of shot from. their own guns. For most of the batteries the bombardment targets were enemy trenches and barbed wire, the long-range 9.2-inch howitzers being given the more distant targets. 66th HAG was given the village of Vis-en-Artois and its approach roads as a special target. Once the batteries had completed their forward moves and ammunition stockpiled, daily bombardments began in early April with air observation by No 8 Squadron, Royal Flying Corps (RFC). 4 April was V Day when the main bombardment began at 06.30. A delay meant that 6 April became W1 Day; sunny clear weather made for good observation and a great deal was accomplished by the guns on this extra day. By 8 April (Y Day) the bombardment had become continuous, except for pauses for air photography, and was continued until two hours after the left-hand infantry divisions of VII Corps (14th (Light) and 56th (1st London)) had launched their assault at Zero (07.45) on 9 April. According to the plan, after the infantry had gained their first objective (the Black Line) and resumed their advance at Zero + 2 hours, the heavy howitzers of 66th HAG would fire barrages ahead of them within their lane, then lift back to the Wancourt–Feuchy line (the Brown Line). The 4th and 5th barrages would begin once the infantry advanced from their second objective (the Blue Line) towards the Brown Line at Zero + 6 hours. Beyond, the Green Line on Wancourt Ridge was the final objective. The two right-hand divisions of VII Corps facing the Hindenburg Line (30th and 21st) were not due to attack until 12.55 and 16.15 respectively, when it was hoped that the defenders would have been disrupted by the rest of the attack. In the event, the left hand divisions captured the Black and Blue line objectives but were held up short of the Brown (Wancourt–Feuchy) Line. The right hand divisions secured part of the front trench of the Hindenburg Line but could get no further. An additional heavy artillery bombardment of the Wancourt–Feuchy Line was arranged and 14th (L) Division attacked again at 19.00. All available guns bombarded the Wancourt–Feuchy Line at dawn next day, but 56th (1st L) Division was still clearing part of the Hindenburg Line and could not resume its advance until noon. By nightfall 14th (L) and 56th (1st L) Divisions had secured the Wancourt–Feuchy Line, but it was too late to exploit any further. They worked their way slowly towards the Green Line over the following days. Elsewhere, Third and First Armies had scored some outstanding successes, including the capture of Vimy Ridge.

VII Corps HA now had the task of moving its guns and ammunition forward to bring their next targets within range. By 13 April 183rd SB had begun its move forward. VII Corps attacked again on 23 April (the Second Battle of the Scarpe), preceded by bombardments of villages close to the German front. 66th HAG paid particular attention to Hendecourt and Rémy. This attack was at first successful but some of the ground was lost again when the Germans counter-attacked at 20.00. However, the Germans pulled back a little next day. This advance meant another move forward for some of the heavy guns. During the lull the gunners were withdrawn in relays to get some rest. VII Corps' next operation (the Third Battle of the Scarpe) was on 3 May, preceded by three days of intense bombardment by the heavy artillery of enemy held villages. The attack was a failure. On 7 May VII Corps HA began a systematic and continuous bombardment of the Hindenburg Line with its 8-inch and 9.2-inch howitzers.

However, the Arras Offensive was over, and the BEF began switching artillery north to Second Army for its planned operation at Messines. On 8 May 66th HAG prepared to go to Second Army, leaving 183rd SB with 59th HAG around Boisleux-Saint-Marc. Nevertheless, Third Army continued some operations against the Hindenburg Line, including an attack by 33rd Division on 20 May, with 183rd SB among the supporting artillery laying a steady barrage on the front line. With only one howitzer for every 60 yards (55 m), the guns had to make minor adjustments left and right to cover the whole frontage. At 5 minutes before Zero (05.15) the heavies lifted off the front line to fire on the support line. The surprise attack was a success, the infantry easily seizing the front trench, but they could not maintain the lodgement that they made in the support line. A second attack at 19.30 found the Hindenburg Line battered almost out of recognition, but the deep dugouts were still intact, and the support line was strongly held. The attack on the support line was renewed at the unusual time of 13.55 on 27 May, with the 9.2-inch howitzers of 59th HAG concentrating on the dugouts, and the infantry succeeded in capturing a length of the line.

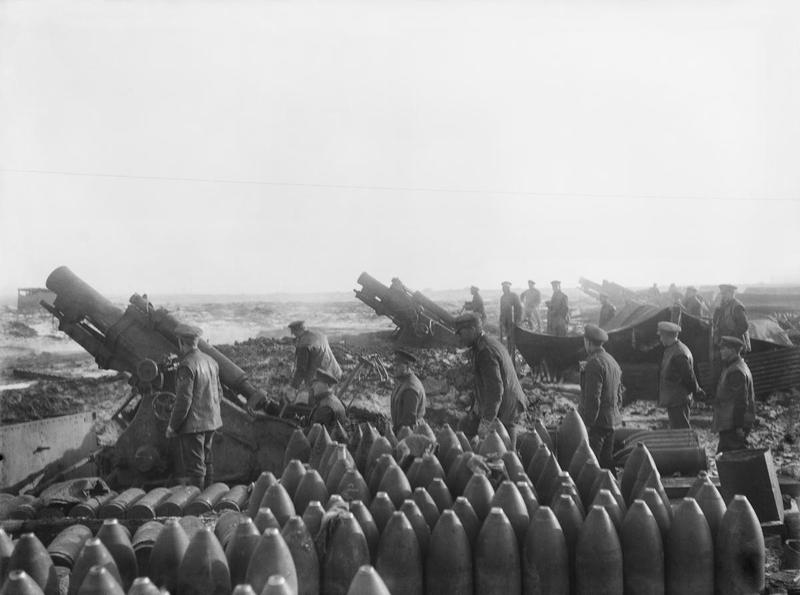
A battery of 9.2-inch howitzers in action.

During June VII Corps dispersed much of the heavy artillery that had been gathered for the Arras offensive. 183rd SB was transferred to the neighbouring VI Corps on 18 June, but one gun was temporarily re-attached to VII Corps HA on 2 July as part of 'C' Group. The section finally left VII Corps HA on 8 July (and its second echelon on 14 July) when 183rd SB was assigned to 54th HAG with First Army in the Loos sector. First Army had recently attacked along the Souchez valley, and was reorganising its heavy artillery for an assault on Hill 70. This strongly-fortified position was a vital observation point, and it was considered that if it was captured the enemy would be forced to attempt to re-take it, when their troops could be dealt with by concentrated artillery fire. It would act as a diversion from the Ypres Offensive then being prepared. The heavy artillery carried out wire-cutting, CB and counter-mortar tasks while I Corps and Canadian Corps adjusted their fronts and prepared to attack. The Hill 70 operation was delayed by bad weather and the worn condition of much of the heavy artillery. On 15 August the Canadians carried the hill while the heavy howitzers blasted strongpoints and then the counter-attacking German troops. Counter-attacks continued until 18 August, with the heavy artillery of both corps engaged. The Canadians attacked Lens on 21 August, when the Canadian and British heavy artillery groups shelled the city where waiting German infantry were packed into the cellars and ruined buildings. The Canadians continued to improve their positions until 25 August.

=== Flanders coast ===
On 28 August 183 SB was transferred to 1st HAG with Fourth Army. Since early July Fourth Army had been gathered at Nieuport on the Flanders coast for a projected offensive in conjunction with amphibious landings and the Ypres Offensive. However, the Germans had put in a spoiling attack at Nieuport and the offensive from Ypres had bogged down. While Fourth Army awaited developments, the heavy artillery on both sides engaged in mutual CB duels. As soon as it arrived 183rd SB was firing CB neutralisation shoots, and also concentrations and 'crash' barrages at suspected enemy HQs and targets such as 'Lone House' and the Palace Hotel at Westende when weather conditions permitted observation. 183 SB did not suffer many casualties compared with the shorter range batteries in front of them, but on 2 and 3 October the battery was hit with gas shells, with a few casualties. The slow progress of the Ypres offensive meant that the coastal operation was repeatedly postponed, though as late as 21 September it was still considered a possibility. It was not finally cancelled until 14 October, when the fighting at Ypres was bogged down in the First Battle of Passchendaele. Nevertheless, the artillery exchanges continued until Fourth Army's artillery concentration on the Flanders coast was broken up in early December. 183rd SB pulled out of its gun positions on 4 December and went to the Siege Park. Subsequently, it was sent to rest with X Corps HA in the rear area of Second Army.

== Reorganisation ==
On 16 December 1917 183rd Siege Battery was completely reorganised. A section of 2 guns with 2 officers and 80 other ranks (ORs), together with 29 ORs of its Army Service Corps (ASC) motor transport section, was transferred to 91st SB, bringing it up to six 9.2-inch howitzers, and the other section of 183rd SB similarly joined 93rd SB. 183rd SB was reconstituted on the same day when it was joined by one section each from 305th and 308th SBs, each with two 6-inch howitzers. These weapons fired a lighter shell and had a shorter range than the 9.2s, but they were more mobile, being towed as a single load by a lorry rather than three loads behind a caterpillar tractor.

Heavy Artillery Groups were now becoming permanent RGA Brigades rather than ad hoc groups. On 25 December 60th HAG was redesignated 60th Bde and moved to Arques, where it took over four batteries at rest, including 183rd SB. 183rd SB remained with 60th HAG for the rest of the war. Orders to move up to the line were cancelled on 26 December and the whole brigade remained at rest and training until 6 January 1918 when the batteries began moving from Arques to Ypres, where they relieved other batteries in position, half a battery at a time, and began improving the gun positions, OPs and reserve positions. There was little firing, but 183rd SB had a successful aeroplane shoot of 200 rounds on 19 January, and another the following day. On 5 February the brigade prepared to move out of the line into GHQ Reserve. The railway trucks for loading the guns and ammunition of 183rd SB arrived on the evening of 7 February, but the engine to pull them did not appear until the following morning. Eventually the whole brigade was shifted to Saint-Jans-Cappel. After two weeks training in GHQ Reserve, the brigade entrained again on 26 February and on 1 March moved into accommodation in Ervillers, south of Arras in Third Army' s sector, where it came under VI Corps HA. 183rd SB's allotted gun position was found to be unsuitable, being too close to a sound-ranging station, so it had to be moved. 183rd SB appears to have remained silent at this time, taking little or no part in harassing fire. On the night of 12/13 March the battery was shelled with lachrymatory gas, which led to fears that the anticipated German spring offensive had begun.

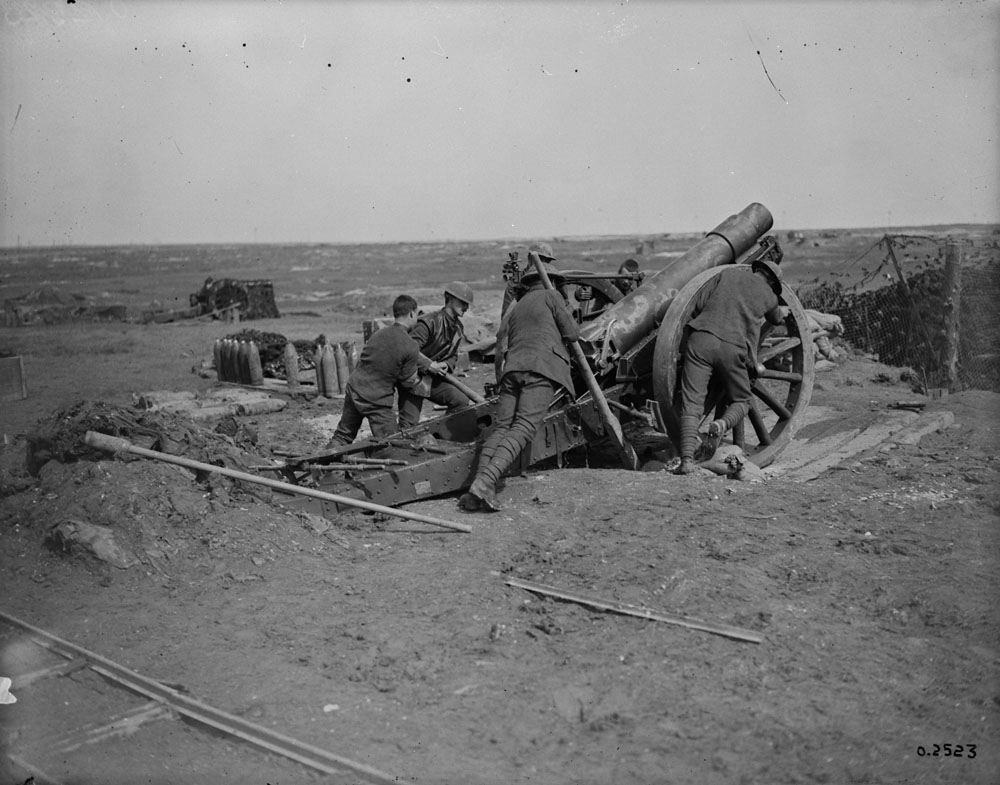
Positioning a 6-inch howitzer.

=== Spring offensive ===
The German spring offensive actually began at 04.40 on 21 March with an intensive bombardment of the whole of Third Army's line. In reply VI Corps HA, including the silent batteries, began counter-preparation (CP) fire at 05.12. Thick fog blinded the observation posts (OPs) and soon all telephone lines to the forward batteries were cut by shellfire. The fog screened the attackers, and 176th (2/1st Staffordshire) Brigade was pushed out of Bullecourt in front of 60th Bde despite the support of the heavy artillery. Before the end of the day large parties of enemy infantry were within 2,000 yards (1,800 m) of the battery positions: 183rd and other batteries were firing over open sights. After dark they were ordered to pull back. The German attacks continued on 22 March, and by late morning most of VI Corps HA was turned onto the village of Croisilles, reported to be filling up with German troops who were attacking towards Henin Hill, where British troops were making a stand. As the British infantry fell back to their 3rd Position, 60th Bde's batteries went back to Boiry Aerodrome. By now Third Army was bringing up reserves of infantry and heavy artillery, and 31st Division was moved towards Ervillers on 23 March provide a right flank guard to VI Corps. Fighting continued around Mory on 24 March, but most of VI Corps' line was reasonably secure, the artillery getting excellent targets when masses of German infantry passed by to reinforce the attacks further south. VI Corps continued to hold Ervillers and its southern (right) flank on 25 March, supported by effective artillery fire, but the pressure to the south meant that the corps had to swing back that night, 31st Division to the line Hamelincourt–Courcelles, and then back to Moyenneville–Ablainzevelle. The Corps HA pulled back behind the 'Purple Line' being organised in the rear, leaving 183rd SB directly attached to 31st Divisional Artillery (DA). The Germans followed up, but their further progress next morning was discouraged by a two-and-a-half hour CP bombardment fired by all the 6-inch and 60-pounder batteries of the corps heavy artillery. The division came under heavy attack during the afternoon and 31st DA ordered 183rd SB back to the cover of a valley behind. However, by nightfall VI Corps' position had stabilised and further withdrawals were countermanded. German attacks on the morning of 27 March were held off by artillery fire alone, but continuous attacks through the afternoon forced 31st Division back a short distance. Artillery broke up the Germans massing to follow up, and VI Corps was able to fill the gaps in its line. Fighting went on over the following days, but there were no further retirements on VI Corps' front, and the heavy artillery responded to calls whenever enemy troops were seen. By 30 March 183rd SB was brought forward again: it re-established communications and arranged SOS lines to defend the new British line of resistance. 31st Division was relieved on the night of 31 March and 183rd SB returned to the command of 60th Bde at midday on 1 April. By 3 April VI Corps had gone over to the counter-attack, retaking Ayette to improve its positions.

On 12 April 183rd SB moved to a new position at Monchy-au-Bois in the 'Green Line' as Third Army solidified its positions and 60th Bde carried out harassing fire (HF) and gas shelling tasks against the enemy to their front. By May Monchy-au-Bois had become a silent gun area, only firing in response to SOS calls from the infantry. However, on 30 May 183rd SB and Guards Divisional Artillery bombarded an enemy hutted camp, directed by an officer of the battery in an RFC observation balloon. Ammunition supply eased in June, and 60th Bde's batteries took part in frequent HF and CB shoots with aircraft or balloon observation. On 17 June all the 6-inch and 60-pdr batteries pushed a section well forward to take part in a high explosive (HE) and gas concentration on hostile batteries, and these forward sections were used again on 30 June/1 July. On 19 June No 2 Supply Company of the Tank Corps was attached to carry ammunition up to 183rd SB, and by 10 July these were bringing up 200 rounds per tank each night for 183rd and 342nd SBs until they were withdrawn at the end of July. On 22/23 June the brigade fired in support of a night tank raid on Bucquoy, though this was not particularly successful. At this time the Spanish flu epidemic began to affect large numbers of officers and men of 60th Bde's batteries. On 22/23 July 60th Bde's batteries fired in support of a large raid by 99th Infantry Bde of 2nd Division near Ablainzevelle. By the end of the month fire to support raids by VI Corps and the neighbouring IV Corps was frequent, together with night gas bombardments of hostile batteries, as Third Army prepared for the forthcoming Allied offensive. On 5 August 60th Bde was ordered into Corps Reserve to train for this offensive; 183rd SB pulled out next day.

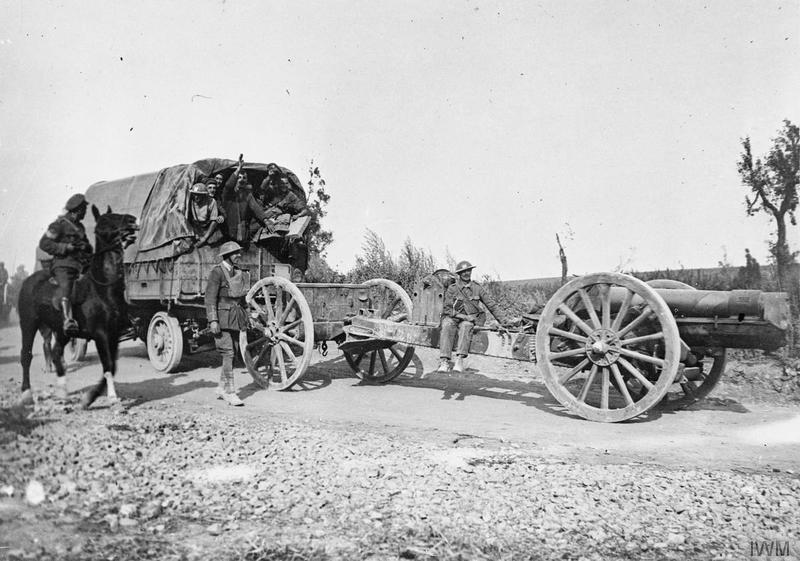
6-inch howitzer moving up, summer 1918.

=== Hundred Days Offensive ===
The offensive was launched on 8 August (the Battle of Amiens), and Third Army joined in with the Battle of Albert starting on 21 August. 60th Brigade's batteries had begun resuming their old positions on 16 August, and formed a composite group with 84th Bde, RGA, commanded by Lieutenant-Colonel J.D. Sherer, commanding officer of 60th Bde. On 21 August the Sherer Group fired to support the successful surprise attack on Courcelles and Ablainzevelle by the Guards and 2nd Divisions. On 23 August Ervillers and Gomiécourt were taken, and 60th Bde's batteries moved up to Ervillers. On 24 August 60th Bde bombarded Mory Copse before it was captured by 99th Infantry Bde, and then harassed Bullecourt, Quéant, Chérisy and Hendecourt. Early next day, 5th Infantry Bde of 2nd Division took Béhagnies and Sapignies after bombardment by 60th Bde, then 62nd (2nd West Riding) Division passed through. It took Mory village and advanced up to Vaulx-Vraucourt covered by 60th Bde, despite a German counter-bombardment and a failed counter-attack. Over the next few days (the Second Battle of Bapaume) VI Corps strengthened its position, including taking the Sugar Factory at Vaulx-Vraucourt. On 1 September 183rd SB moved a section forward to Vraucourt. On 2 September VI Corps was pushing against heavy opposition up a series of narrow spurs and valleys towards Morchies and Lagnicourt, the Sherer Group supporting 62nd (2nd WR) Division's capture of Noreuil and the line to Beugny. That night the enemy pulled back on VI Corps' front. 60th Brigade followed up beyond Morchies, but was then ordered to stand fast while the infantry pursued the enemy back to the Hindenburg Line. It was withdrawn from supporting 2nd Division and reverted to the command of VI Corps HA.

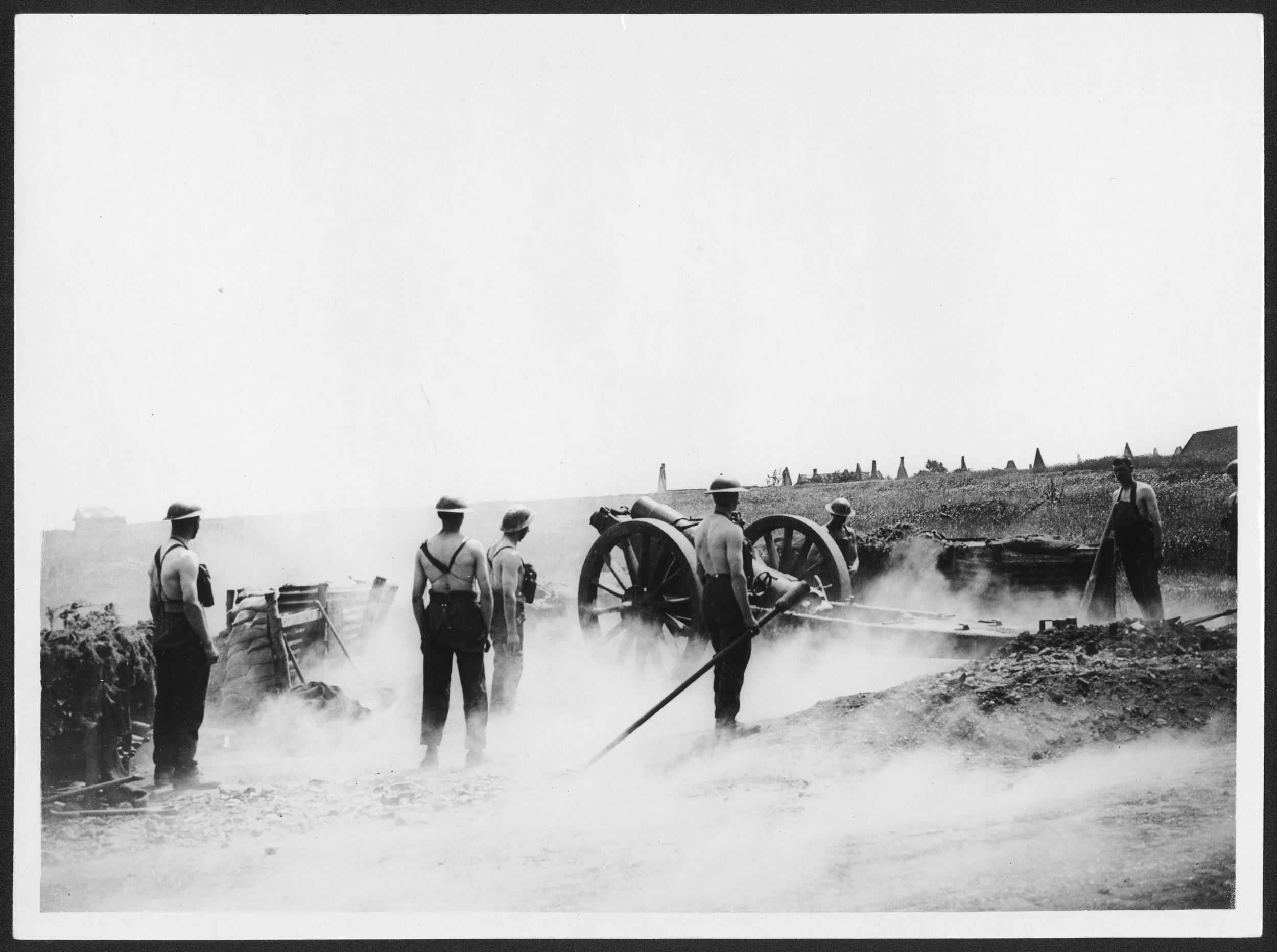
6-inch howitzer in action, summer 1918.

183rd Siege Bty carried out reorganisation and training in the Vraucourt area until 10 September when it moved up to silent positions near Doignies. Next day at 18.15 it took part in a bombardment by 60th Bde to support a preliminary operation by 2nd Division. The division closed up to Hermies and gained a foothold across the dry Canal du Nord at the 'Spoil Heap', ready for Third Army to launch the Battle of Havrincourt on 12 September. For this 62nd (2nd WR) Division attacked at 05.25 supported by a bombardment and CB fire from 60th Bde, and captured Havrincourt and the Hindenburg front trenches. The brigade fired again next morning as 62nd (2nd WR) Division completed its captures. On 15 September 183rd SB pushed a section forward to south of Hermies, joined by the other section on 17 September. The brigade began wire-cutting and destructive shoots in preparation. for the next attack.

The Allies began a coordinated series of offensives all along the Western Front on 26 September. Third Army joined in on 27 September with the Battle of the Canal du Nord, in which VI Corps was tasked with capturing the Flesquières Ridge. Zero was at 05.20, and 60th Bde's batteries fired for six hours on bombardment tasks for 3rd Division, then 62nd (2nd WR) Division passed through to keep up the pressure. The division took Flesquières and Ribécourt, but failed in front of Marcoing. 183rd Siege Bty pushed a section forward north of Havrincourt. Next morning 62nd (2nd WR) Division took Marcoing and crossed the canal. 60th Brigade's batteries also crossed over (3rd Division's Royal Engineers had built a trestle bridge suitable for medium artillery on the night of 26/27 September) and took up positions by Ribécourt. The batteries continued to support operations on 29 September, when Masnières was captured, sending reconnaissance officers forward to keep track of the fluid situation. On 1 October 183rd SB moved up to Marcoing and came into action again.

There was then a pause while the recent gains were consolidated. 60th Brigade' batteries were on call to support 3rd Division if required. The Second Battle of Cambrai began at 04.30 on 8 October, when 183rd SB and 60th Bde's other 6-inch batteries fired a three-hour bombardment as 3rd Division attacked and took Forenville. Afterwards 183rd SB moved forward to just north of Crèvecœur and came back into action. Next morning the batteries provided a preparatory bombardment for Guards Division to attack and seize the last of the previous day's objectives, but the attacking infantry found only machine gun rearguards, the German main body having retreated. They were soon out of range of the batteries. Owing to heavy traffic on the roads, 60th Bde was unable to take part in the pursuit to the River Selle. On 13 October the brigade sent its medium batteries (including 183rd SB) forward to north of Estourmel, where they parked their guns and lorries on the Cambrai–Le Cateau road ready to go into action if required. By 14 October German resistance was stiffening along the line of the Selle and the batteries were ordered into action east of Quiévy. Next day they began firing on CB targets. 60th Brigade was now affiliated to 62nd (2nd WR) Division holding the right sector of VI Corps' front.

Third Army had to prepare a full-scale operation to assault the Selle. On 17 October 60th Bde's 6-inch batteries began wire-cutting by day and gas shelling of enemy battery positions by night, receiving some retaliation (183rd SB's Battery Sergeant-Major was wounded). At 02.00 on 20 October the 6-inch batteries supported 62nd (2nd WR) Division as it captured Solesmes on the far bank of the river, after which 183rd SB and the other batteries moved up and came into action just west of the town. Next day they moved into the town's western outskirts. On 23 October all the batteries fired a 12-hour bombardment supporting 3rd Division's 3 miles (4.8 km) advance across the Harpies stream to Romeries and up to the Écaillon stream. On completion of their tasks 60th Bde's 6-inch batteries pulled out by sections and moved up to Romeries. Next day at 04.00 they supported 3rd Division's advance across the Écaillon to capture Ruesnes, after which 183rd SB again moved up by sections and came into action east of Escarmain.

A period of stationary warfare ensued as both sides consolidated their positions and the BEF prepared to renew its offensive (the Battle of the Sambre). On 27 October 183rd SB moved forward again, to positions north of Beaudignies, and next day with the other 6-inch batteries of 60th Bde it began CB work, which it continued until the end of the month. On 1 November the batteries carried out CB fire from 05.15 to 09.00 in support of the neighbouring XVII and XXII Corps as they crossed the Rhonelle, captured Maresches, Préseau and Marly, and later liberated the town of Valenciennes on the River Schelde. CB work continued on 2–3 November, while 183rd SB moved by sections up to Ruesnes. On 4 November VI and the flanking corps made a concerted push at 05.30, with all guns of 60th Bde supporting with barrage and CB fire until noon, when the enemy had been driven out of range. The batteries of 60th Bde were then ordered to stand fast, and 100 ORs from each battery were detailed for road mending to help other units and supplies to get forward and pursue the defeated enemy. This continued until hostilities ended when the Armistice with Germany came into effect at 11.00 on 11 November.

== Post-Armistice ==
After the Armistice VI Corps was selected to be part of the Allied occupation of the Rhineland, but 60th Bde and most of its batteries were transferred to IV Corps HA. This formation was also detailed for the Army of Occupation, but this order was cancelled. On 5 December 60th Bde moved to Neuf-Mesnil, near Maubeuge, where it came under the command of 42nd (East Lancashire) Division. Between 12 and 18 December the brigade's batteries marched with 42nd (EL) Division to Namêche in Belgium where it joined X Corps and 183rd SB went into billets for the winter.

Demobilisation got under way in late December, the first to leave being coal miners and men from other 'pivotal' trades. The brigade was ordered to collect salvage, and 183rd SB was detailed for this duty, gathering a number of German lorries, ammunition limbers and machinery that were sent to corps HQ. Training and pre-demobilisation education courses continued in the new year, and groups of men were regularly sent to camps for demobilisation. However, 60th Bde was now belatedly selected to serve with the British Army of the Rhine. On 23 March 1919 the batteries of 60th Bde each drew two 6-inch howitzers from the Canadian Corps to complete them to the 6-gun establishment, and a number of reinforcements were received in early April. The brigade began its march from Namêche on 8 April, and reached Düren on 11 April, coming under IV Corps. 183rd SB was billeted in Mannheim. Further reinforcements were received, but demobilisation continued for war-service men. 60th Brigade, RGA, was disbanded on 26 September 1919, and 183rd Siege Battery was also disbanded before the end of the year.

The Commonwealth War Graves Commission lists the names of 18 members of the battery who died in service between 1917 and 1921; there may be others who were simply listed as RGA.
