= Battle of the Sambre =

Battle of the Sambre may refer to:

- Battle of Sabis (57 BC), also known as the Battle of the Sambre
- Battle of the Sambre (1914), commonly known as the Battle of Charleroi, between French and German forces
- Battle of the Sambre (1918), the final British offensive of World War I
