= Boiry-Saint-Martin =

- Commune
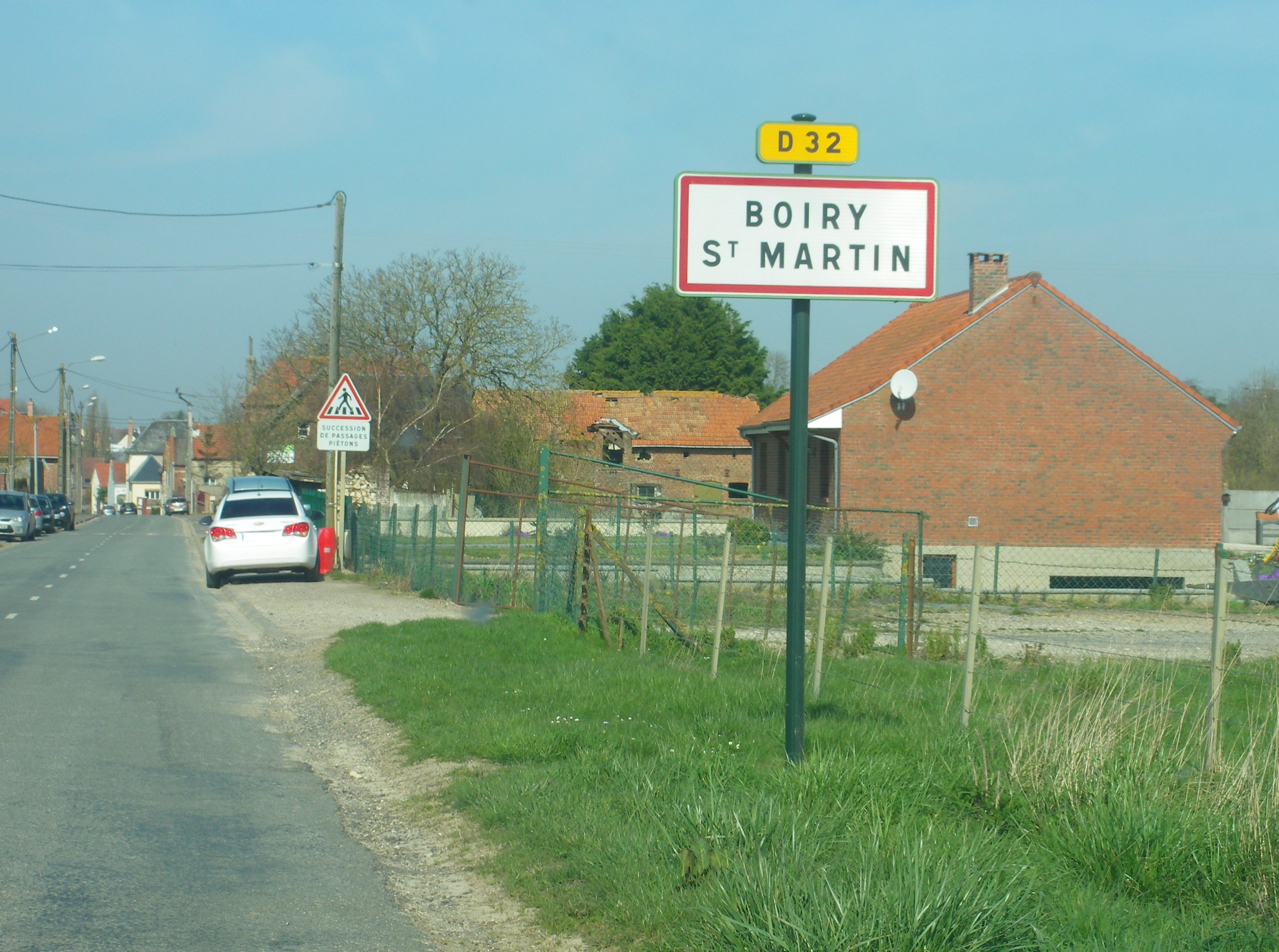
- The road into Boiry-Saint-Martin

- Coat of arms
- Location of Boiry-Saint-Martin
- Location within France Location within Hauts-de-France
- Coordinates: 50°12′00″N 2°45′37″E
- Country: France
- Region: Hauts-de-France
- Department: Pas-de-Calais
- Arrondissement: Arras
- Canton: Avesnes-le-Comte
- Intercommunality: CU Arras

Government
  - Mayor (2020–2026): Cédric Delmotte
- Area^{1}: 3.5 km^{2} (1.4 sq mi)
- Elevation: 80 m (260 ft)
- Highest elevation: 122 m (400 ft)
- Lowest elevation: 79 m (259 ft)
- Population (2023): 255
  - Density: 73/km^{2} (190/sq mi)
- Time zone: UTC+01:00 (CET)
  - Summer (DST): UTC+02:00 (CEST)
- INSEE/Postal code: 62146 /62175
- ^{1} French Land Register data, which excludes lakes, ponds, glaciers > 1 km^{2} (0.386 sq mi or 247 acres) and river estuaries.

Boiry-Saint-Martin (French pronunciation: [bwaʁi sɛ̃ maʁtɛ̃]) is a commune in the Pas-de-Calais department in the Hauts-de-France region in northern France.

== Geography ==
A farming village located 7 miles (11 km) south of Arras on the D32 road.

== Population ==
Historical population
Year	Pop.	±% p.a.
1968	289	—
1975	289	+0.00%
1982	276	−0.66%
1990	275	−0.05%
1999	281	+0.24%
2007	299	+0.78%
2012	284	−1.02%
2017	277	−0.50%
2023	255	−1.37%
Source: INSEE

== Sights ==
- The church of St. Martin, rebuilt after the destruction of the village during World War I.

== See also ==
- Communes of the Pas-de-Calais department
