= Royal Wilhelm Gymnasium =

Coordinates: 52.510475°N 13.373178°E

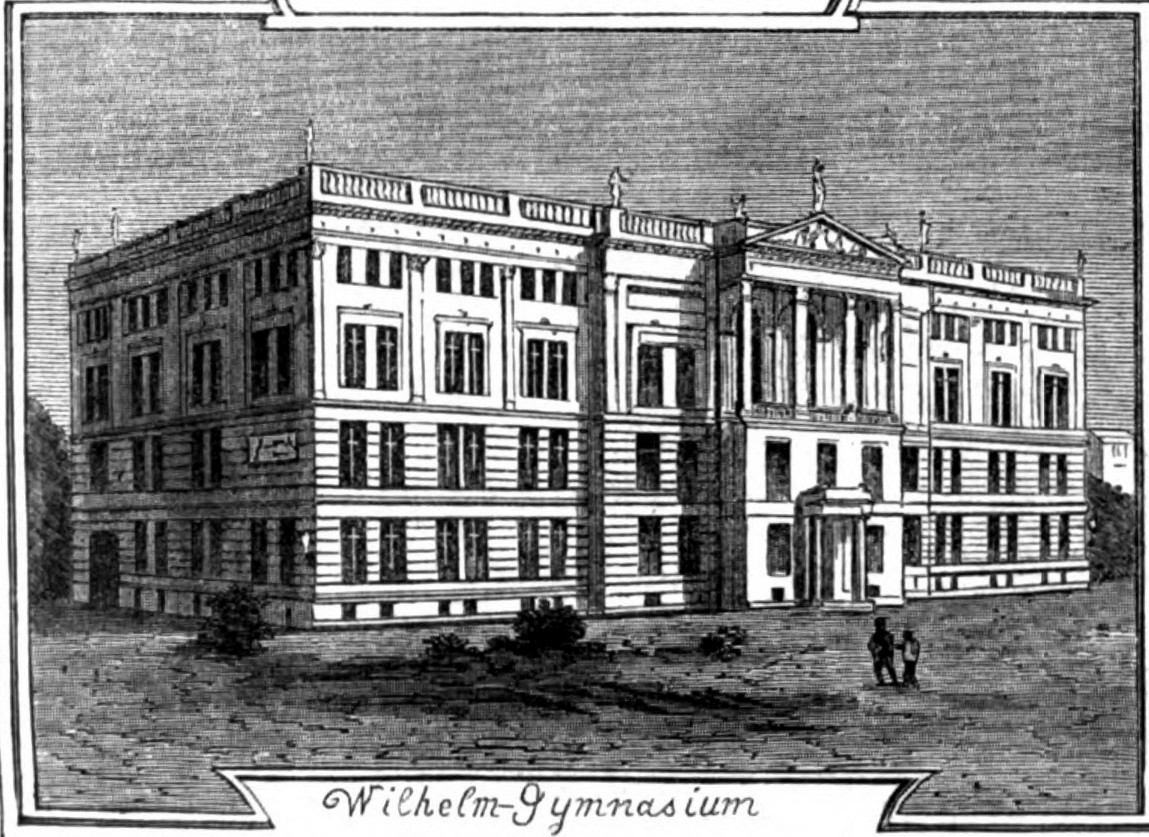
1866

The Royal Wilhelm Gymnasium (Königliches Wilhelms-Gymnasium) was a gymnasium in Berlin from 1858 to 1924.

The school was located at 15 Bellevuestraße in what is now the Tiergarten district and is named after King Wilhelm I, who on 21 March 1861 became its patron, granted it the rights of royal gymnasium and allowed it to be named after him.

== History ==
It developed from the Royal Progymnasium, which had opened on 17 May 1858, in front of the Potsdam Gate. Given the rapid population growth in this district ("Geheimratsviertel"), inhabited by high-ranking civil servants, officers, and wealthy merchants, the school urgently needed to expand and rebuild and so on 8 June 1863 the foundation stone of a new building was laid in William I's presence. It held its first abitur exam in Michaelmas term 1863 and as of Easter 1865 parts of the new building were already in use. It was designed by Adolf Lohse, with construction of the front building overseen by Hubert Göbbels, on an elongated plot of land from 15 to 17-18a Bellevuestraße, ending near the Hotel Esplanade. Later additions included a gym and a director's residence, both built in 1870–1871. For a time there was also an entrane on Viktoriastraße.

On 26 May 1881 students of the Gymnasium founded the Landsmannschaft Guilelmia, a student fraternity. The Gymnasium was very popular and, in the years before the turn of the century, reached its highest enrolment with almost 1,000 students, predominantly from Protestant and Jewish families. Only at the beginning of the 20th century did the number of students decline slightly, despite Berlin's continued population growth, as other Gymnasia opened in the immediate vicinity.

At the start of the Weimar Republic it dropped "Royal" from its name and in 1921 ownership of its site and buildings passed to the Reich Treasury, which later adapted the building for its use as the Provisional Reich Economic Council. In December 1923 the Ministry of Education ordered it to close the following Easter (then the end of the school year). The lower and upper sixth forms were able to continue teaching at the State French Gymnasium (Collège Français) thanks to retired teachers offering to work for free. The remaining classes were merged with those of the French Gymnasium.

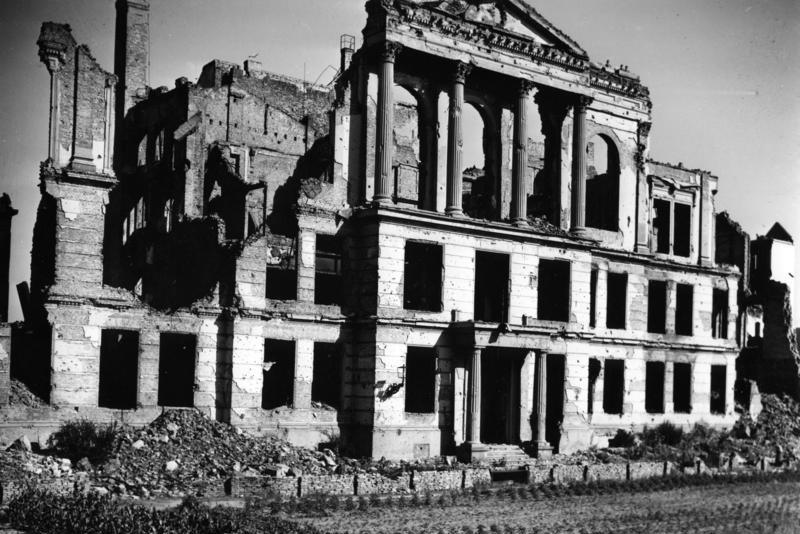
Ruins of the People's Court (formerly the Wilhelms-Gymnasium)

The gym was demolished in 1926 and the former director's residence converted into a service villa. The building was turned into the People's Court in 1935. The court's president Roland Freisler was killed and the building hit in the 3 February 1945 USAAF raid on Berlin. The ruins were demolished in the 1950s and most of the site is now occupied by The Center Potsdamer Platz, though the new Potsdamer Straße runs along the southern part.

== Directors ==
- Founding rector: Julius Krause († 1860)
- 1863–1904: Otto Kübler (1827–1912), interim 'dirigent' from 1860 onwards
- 1904–1908: Gottlieb Leuchtenberger (1839–1914)
- 1908–1922: (1923–1929: Prinz-Heinrich-Gymnasium in Schöneberg) Gustav Sorof (1863–1935)

== Faculty ==
- Otto Rubensohn (history, teaching: 1922–1924)

== Alumni ==
- Heinrich Biltz (1865–1943), chemist
- Wilhelm Biltz (1877–1943), chemist
- Max Dessoir (1867–1947), psychologist and philosopher
- Herbert von Dirksen (1882–1955), ambassador, writer
- Ferdinand von Hansemann (1861–1900), large landowner, anti-Polish politician
- Manfred Gurlitt (1890–1972), conductor and composer
- Kurt Hahn (1886–1974), teacher and politician
- Kurt Koffka (1886–1941), psychologist
- Walter Mehring (1896–1981), writer
- Franz Oppenheim (1852–1929), industrialist and chemist
- Artur Pappenheim (1870–1916), physician
- Walther Rathenau (1867–1922), minister and industrialist
- Johannes Sobotta (1869–1945), anatomy professor
- Adolf von Trotha (1868–1940), admiral
- Kurt Tucholsky (1890–1935), writer
- Georg Witkowski (1863–1939), literary historian
- Theodor Wolff (1868–1943), writer and publicist

== Bibliography (in German) ==
- Helmut Bräutigam, Gabriele Silbereisen: Volksgerichtshof, ehemals Königliches Wilhelms-Gymnasium, Bellevuestraße 15. In: Helmut Engel, Stefi Jersch-Wenzel, Wilhelm Treue (ed.): Geschichtslandschaft Berlin. Orte und Ereignisse, Band 2: Tiergarten, Teil 1: Vom Brandenburger Tor zum Zoo, Berlin 1989, S. 220–229.
- Emil Schmiele: Das Königliche Wilhelms-Gymnasium in den Jahren 1858 bis 1908, Festschrift zum 17. Mai 1908, Berlin 1908.
- Zum Gedächtnis Otto Küblers. Rede, gehalten bei der Gedächtnisfeier am 22. März 1912 von Professor Dr. [Gustav] Sorof, Direktor, Berlin 1913 (= Beilage zum Jahresbericht des Königlichen Wilhelms-Gymnasiums in Berlin) – enthält auch Informationen zur Gründungsphase des Gymnasiums.
- Das höhere Schulwesen in Preussen. Historisch-statistische Darstellung, begonnen von Ludwig Wiese. Vierter Band umfassend die Zeit von 1874–1901, im Auftrage des Ministers der Geistlichen, Unterrichts- und Medizinal-Angelegenheiten hrsg. v. Bernhard Irmer. Berlin 1902, S. 207 (mit Hinweisen auf die zeitgenössische Literatur).

== Sources ==
- Jahresberichte bzw. sog. Programme des Königlichen Wilhelms-Gymnasiums in Berlin, Berlin 1.1860/61(1861)–5.1864/65(1865) (Digitized); 6.1865/66(1866)–1914/15(1915) – hier sind neben den Schulnachrichten auch wissenschaftliche Aufsätze enthalten (später ohne Jahrgangszählung).
- Archivunterlagen Hans-Thorald Michaelis
