= Women's empowerment =

Giving rights, freedom to make decisions and strengthening women to stand on their own

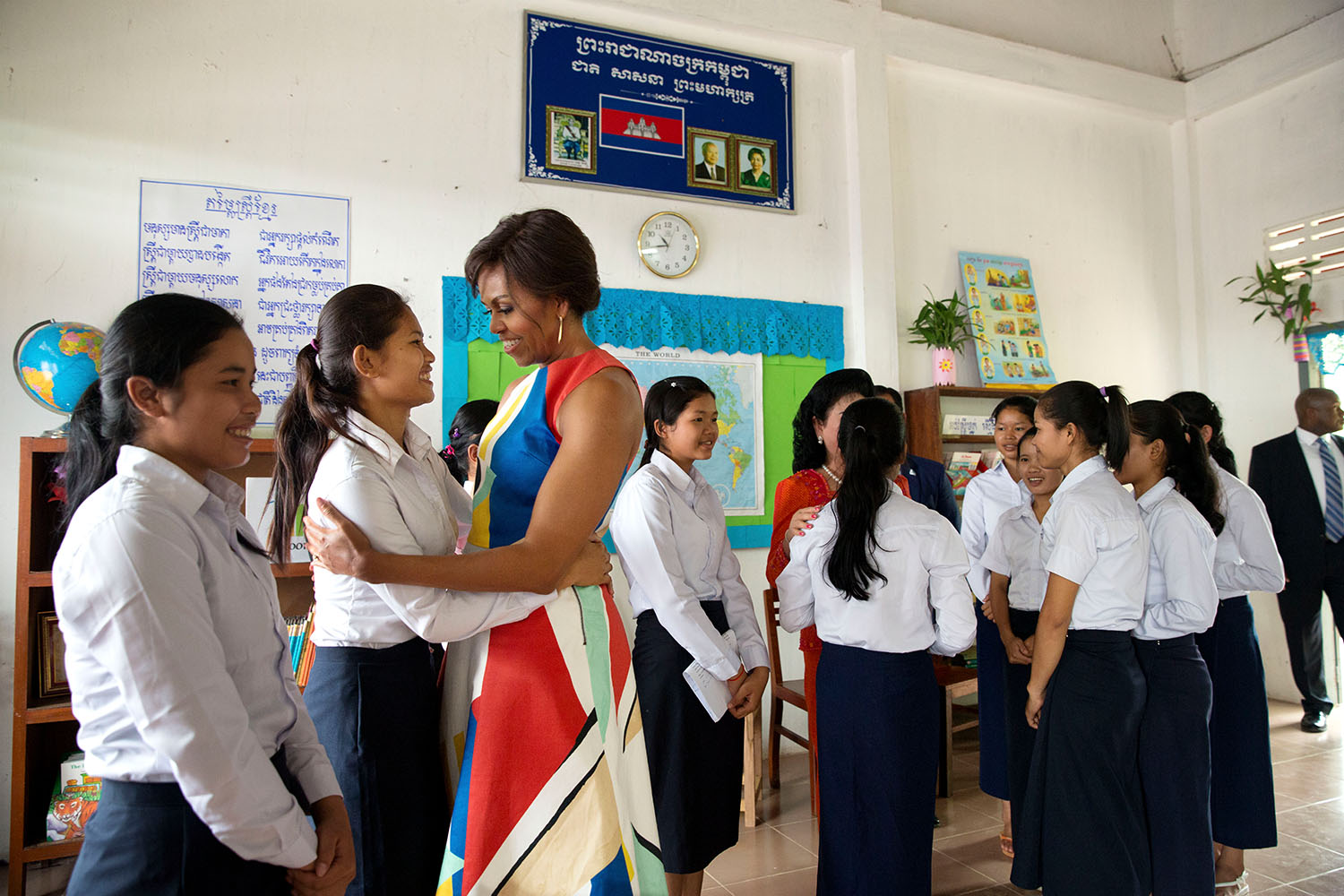
Then-First Lady Michelle Obama greets students during a Room to Read event with First Lady Bun Rany of Cambodia in support of the Let Girls Learn initiative, at Hun Sunni Prasat Bakong High School in Siem Reap, Cambodia, March 21, 2015.

Women's empowerment (or female empowerment) may be defined in several ways, including accepting women's viewpoints, making an effort to seek them and raising the status of women through education, awareness, literacy, equal status in society, better livelihood and training. Women's empowerment equips and allows women to make life-determining decisions through the different societal problems. They may have the opportunity to redefine gender roles or other such roles, which allow them more freedom to pursue desired goals.

Women's empowerment has become a significant topic of discussion in development and economics. Economic empowerment allows women to control and benefit from resources, assets, and income. It also aids in the ability to manage risks and improve women's well-being. It can result in approaches to support trivialized genders in a particular political or social context. While often interchangeably used, the more comprehensive concept of gender empowerment concerns people of any gender, stressing the distinction between biological and gender as a role. Women empowerment helps boost women's status through literacy, education, training and awareness creation. Furthermore, women's empowerment refers to women's ability to make strategic life choices that were previously denied to them.

Nations, businesses, communities and groups may benefit from implementing programs and policies that adopt the notion of female empowerment. Women's empowerment enhances the quality and the quantity of human resources available for development. Empowerment is one of the main procedural concerns when addressing human rights and development.

Women's empowerment is key to economic and social outcomes. Benefits from projects that empower women are higher than those that just mainstream gender. More than half of bilateral finance for agriculture and rural development already mainstreams gender, but only 6 percent treats gender as fundamental. If half of small-scale producers benefited from development interventions that focused on empowering women, it would significantly raise the incomes of an additional 58 million people and increase the resilience of an additional 235 million people.

According to the Food and Agriculture Organization (FAO), increasing women's empowerment is essential for women's well-being (Women for Women's problems) and has a positive impact on agricultural production, food security, diets and child nutrition.

Several principles define women's empowerment, such as, for one to be empowered, one must come from a position of disempowerment. They must acquire empowerment rather than have it given to them by an external party. Other studies have found that empowerment definitions entail people having the capability to make important decisions in their lives while also being able to act on them. Empowerment and disempowerment are relative to each other at a previous time; empowerment is a process rather than a product.

Scholars have identified two forms of empowerment: economic empowerment and political empowerment.

== Economic ==
Since the 1980s, the push for neoliberalism prioritizes competitiveness and self-reliance as a measurement for economic success. Individuals and their identifying communities that do not meet society's favored neoliberal standards are looked down upon and prone to lower their self-esteem. Some groups who do not fit the preferable neoliberal image are the lower working class and the unemployed.

Specifically, neoliberalism has negatively impacted women's self-worth through its welfare reform policies. Mary Corcoran et al. theorize that conservative welfare reformers believe welfare dependency is the cause of poverty. This leads welfare reformers to widen the criteria for an individual to qualify as a welfare recipient, limiting the number of people dependent on welfare. These criteria include: work requirements and time limits, rapidly pushing women into the labor market. The active push for women to enter the labor market reinforces the notion that single mothers and unpaid care laborers are unproductive to the American economy. In consequence, women are forced to settle for low-paying unstable jobs while having to manage their maternal and domestic responsibilities. Scholars believe welfare reform's underlying purpose is to disempower women by suppressing women's agency and economic independence. Women can counteract neoliberalism's social implications and welfare reform by creating opportunities for women's empowerment, like job training.

In addition, policymakers are suggested to support job training to aid into entrance in the formal markets. One recommendation is to provide more formal education opportunities for women that would allow for higher bargaining power in the home. They would have more access to higher wages outside the home; and as a result, make it easier for women to get a job in the market.

Women's empowerment and achieving gender equality help society ensure the sustainable development of a country. Many world leaders and scholars have argued that sustainable development is impossible without gender equality and women's empowerment. Sustainable development accepts environmental protection, social and economic development, including women's empowerment. In the context of women and development, empowerment must include more choices for women to make on their own.

Strengthening women's access to property inheritance and land rights is another method used to economically empower women. This would allow them better means of asset accumulation, capital, and bargaining power needed to address gender inequalities. Often, women in developing and underdeveloped countries are legally restricted from their land on the sole basis of gender. Having a right to their land gives women a sort of bargaining power that they would not normally have; they gain more opportunities for economic independence and formal financial institutions.

Race has an integral impact on women's empowerment in areas such as employment. Employment can help create empowerment for women. Many scholars suggest that when we discuss women's empowerment, discussing the different barriers that underprivileged women face, which make it more difficult for them to obtain empowerment in society, is important when examining the impact of race in connection to employment. Significantly examining how opportunities are structured by gender, race, and class can transpire social change. Work opportunities and the work environment can create empowerment for women. Empowerment in the workplace can positively affect job satisfaction and performance, having equality in the workplace can greatly increase the sense of empowerment.

In the case women have the opportunity to settle for stable jobs, women of color encounter a lack of equal accessibility and privileges in work settings. They are faced with more disadvantages in the workplace. Patricia Parker argues that African American women's empowerment is their resistance to control, standing up for themselves and not conforming to societal norms and expectations. In connection to power, feminist perspectives look at empowerment as a form of resistance within systems of unequal power relations. Within the societal setting of race, gender, and class politics, African American women's empowerment in the work environment "can be seen as resistance to attempts to fix meanings of appropriate identity and behavior, where such meanings are interpreted as controlling, exploitative, and otherwise oppressive to African American women." When talking about women's empowerment, many scholars suggest examining the social injustices on women in everyday organizational life that are influenced by race, class, and gender.

Another methodology for women's economic empowerment also includes microcredit. Microfinance institutions aim to empower women in their community by giving them access to loans that have low-interest rates without the requirement of collateral. More specifically, they(micro-finance institutions) aim to give microcredit to women who want to be entrepreneurs. The success and efficiency of microcredit and micro-loans are controversial and constantly debated. Some critics claim that microcredit alone does not guarantee women have control over the way the loan is used. Microfinance institutions do not address cultural barriers that allow men to still control household finances; as a result, microcredit may simply be transferred to the husband. Microcredit does not relieve women of household obligations, and even if women have credit, they do not have the time to be as active in the market as men.

== Political empowerment ==
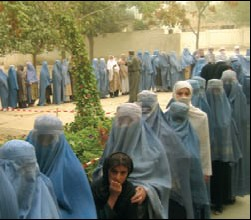
Afghan women voting for the presidential election in 2004

Political empowerment supports creating policies that best support gender equality and agency for women in both the public and private spheres. Methods that have been suggested are to create affirmative action policies that have a quota for the number of women in policy making and parliament positions. As of 2017, the global average of women who hold lower and single house parliament positions is 23.6 percent. Further recommendations have been made to increase women's rights to vote, voice opinions, and the ability to run for office with a fair chance of being elected. Because women are typically associated with child care and domestic responsibilities in the home, they have less time dedicated to entering the labor market and running their businesses. Policies that increase their bargaining power in the household would include policies that account for cases of divorce, policies for better welfare for women, and policies that give women control over resources (such as property rights). However, participation is not limited to the realm of politics. It can include participation in the household, in schools, and the ability to choose for oneself. Some theorists believe that women bargaining power and agency in the household must be achieved before they can move on to broader political participation.

Women will be less likely to be selected to lead and be involved in politics to make decisions. Women have been unable to become leaders in their communities due to financial, social and legal constraints. Organizational and cultural limitations also affect women in the fields where men are dominant. Those industries include science, engineering, finance and much more.

António Guterres, the secretary-general of the United Nations mentions that women can gain knowledge, wisdom, and insights only if they are included equally in all aspects of society. Equal representation of women contributes to peace, reduces conflict, and support long-term sustainable development. United Nations Development Programme (UNDP) raises the concern gender equality in party policies and platforms, and commits to take actions for supporting the presence and influence of women in political parties. Erin Vilardi, the founder of VoteRunLead points out that it is an opportunity to create real change but to recognize social inequalities in women's access to political office despite the number of women who are standing up to volunteer on campaigns and run for office themselves.

According to United Nations Development Programme (UNDP), to increase the participation of women in politics:

- Incorporating statement on gender equality into policy
- Having a quota for women's involvement and election
- Establishing goals for female representation
- Increase the number of female candidates and train them
- Increase women's presence in the campaign through greater media exposure

In line with the commitments of the UN, the World Intellectual Property Organization also recognizes that women's empowerment are crucial for sustainable economic, social, and cultural development. WIPO's commitment to protect and value women's innovation and creativity is embodied in its Intellectual Property and Gender Action Plan (IPGAP), which raises awareness about the economic benefits of strengthening the role of women in innovative and creative activities, helps equip governments and stakeholders with data and policymaking tools to improve national ecosystems in support of women and girls, and delivers concrete impact-driven activities that encourage women's use of intellectual property in their entrepreneurial activities. The IPGAP is an action framework to achieved economic equality and empowerment for women and girlswomen's empowerment worldwide. In April 2023, WIPO Director General Daren Tang announced the organization's commitment to closing the gender gap and empowering women and girls around the world by encouraging them to utilize their intellectual property rights to support economic growth: "Our data shows that women are using the global intellectual property system less than men. And that's a loss for all of us. WIPO is working to close this gender gap in intellectual property". This announcement was made during the World Intellectual Property Day 2023 celebration.

=== Digital things enhance political empowerment ===
Digital skills can facilitate women's engagement with local government and increase their decision-making power in their communities. The Women-gov project in Brazil and India, for instance, has helped women improve their understanding of and communication with local government via ICTs. In Brazil, the project trained female community leaders to access and utilize online data on government health services to better respond to public health concerns in their communities. In India, the project worked with women's collectives to establish women-run, internet-connected community information centres to facilitate applications for government assistance (including welfare and entitlements), which in turn improved linkages between the collectives, local authorities and public institutions.

Women with digital skills are better able to make their voices heard on local issues and influence the outcome of decisions that affect themselves and their communities. Digital skills can also empower women to participate in political movements. For instance, the anonymity of ICTs may allow some women to avoid limitations on freedom of speech in repressive societies, while collective mobilization through online networks can enable women to campaign on gender-based issues. Studies show an Iraqi women's group used a multimedia campaign, including an online component, to successfully lobby the Kurdish regional government to outlaw the practice of female genital mutilation. Images taken on mobile phones and distributed via social media have called attention to domestic violence in China and influenced media treatment of court cases on forced abortion.

According to FAO, there are seven success factors to empowering rural women through ICTs:

1. Adapt content so that it is meaningful for them.
2. Create a safe environment for them to share and learn.
3. Be gender-sensitive.
4. Provide them with access and tools for sharing.
5. Build partnerships.
6. Provide the right blend of technologies.
7. Ensure sustainability.

The regulatory role of governments (at local, national, regional, and international levels) is crucial in addressing infrastructural barriers, harmonizing and making the regulatory environment inclusive and gender-responsive, and in protecting all stakeholders from fraud and crime.

== Cultural empowerment ==
As a progressive society, standing for women's rights and empowerment, we must stop viewing culture only as a barrier and an obstacle to women's rights. Culture is an integral and huge part of diversity and a medium that seeks to ensure women's equal opportunities. It recognises their freedom to take pride in their values, whether they are orthodox or modern in nature. This is not to say that centuries of abuse clothed in the spirit of culture should be allowed to continue, let alone be celebrated. Undoubtedly, traditions cloaked in the idea of empowerment should be objected to in light of feminism. For example, some research indicates that women only have an equal chance to have their written work published in peer-reviewed journals if the sex of the author is absolutely unknown to the reviewers. This is a result of historical habitual culture which has led to lack of representation of women in literary and therefore, strongly demonstrated why all cultural legacies cannot and should not be celebrated or encouraged.

There is a need for equal cultural rights for women to be acknowledged and implemented which would in turn help to reconstruct gender in ways that would rise above women's inferiority and subordination. Furthermore, this would significantly improve the conditions for the full and equal enjoyment of their human rights on the whole as argued by the UN expert in the field of cultural rights, Farida Shaheed.

Shaheed continues to add that the perspective and contributions of women must transcend from the margins of cultural life to the centre of the process that creates and shapes cultures around the globe today. "Women must be recognized as, and supported to be, equal spokespersons vested with the authority to determine which of the community's traditions are to be respected, protected and transmitted to future generations."

Malala Yousafzai is an example of how language and literacy can be used to resist colonial and imperialist perspectives. Western media idolized her as an education hero, a subject of violence caused by terrorism and the Taliban and a victim of hostility towards women. In her book, she repositions herself as a powerful voice who considers and evaluates her cultural traditions and presents alternative understanding of literacy.

== Feminist approaches ==
Feminism is defined by the movement's goal of creating women's empowerment. Two methods feminists use to facilitate a sense of women empowerment are consciousness-raising and building relationships with the women participants and their external oppressors.

=== Raising consciousness ===
To create women empowerment, feminists randomly use consciousness raising. When raising consciousness, women not only become knowledgeable about their personal struggles but how it is related to political and economical issues. Raising consciousness allows marginalized individuals to see where they are placed in the larger social structure and pinpoint the root of their oppression. Awareness of their problems will initiate self-mobilization which precisely creates empowerment.

However, scholars Shane Brady and Mary O'Connor have pointed out the term "raising-consciousness" may be misunderstood and offensive to participants. Using the term "raising-consciousness" inflicts the notion that the marginalized community is not aware of their oppression and how to deal with it.

=== Building relationships ===
In addition, feminists, specifically feminist organizers, focus on building relationships as a medium for creating women empowerment. Scholars claim that building relationships results in empowerment because the increasing presence of power gaps in society are due to the lack of relationships that are needed to bridge them. When it comes to forming and maintaining relationships, there needs to be a balance of both collaboration and conflict between the two parties. Conflict commonly arises in situations where community members attempt to build relationships with external power figures like government representatives.

Fostering a space for collaboration as well as deliberation of conflicting ideas is important because sorting out disagreements allows for the formation of trust between the parties. In addition, conflict individually benefits the women participants because it fosters problem-solving skills and opens them to a new pool of knowledge and perspectives on society. Scholars observe that building relationships has a depoliticizing tendency as the activity does not directly challenge the oppressive structures affecting women. A specific observation of this depoliticizing tendency is story telling. When building relationships, feminists encourage women participants to share their personal experiences involving gender oppression, rather than deliberate about strategies to approach the oppressive system.

An organization, "I Live Here Project", commits itself to making sure basic human rights are being met in communities around the world. Its goals are to "speak with" rather than "speak for" because "us" vs "them" builds a unified voice. They don't want to impose western feminist ideals, but instead give these women tools.

Imposing western feminist ideals can fail to account for cultural differences and perspectives. The goal is to use these perspectives to expand people's knowledge and tell unheard and accurate stories.

== Measurements and assessment ==
Women empowerment can be measured through the Gender Empowerment Measure (GEM), which calculates women's participation in a given nation, both politically and economically. GEM is calculated by tracking "the share of seats in parliament held by women; of female legislators, senior officials and managers; and of female profession and technical workers; and the gender disparity in earned income, reflecting economic independence". It ranks countries given this information.

Some critiques of GEM is that it is not concerned with factors regarding society, such as gender, religion, cultural context, legal context, and violations of women's rights. Gender empowerment measure attempts to make a consistent standardized approach to measure women's empowerment; in doing so, it has been critiqued that the GEM doesn't account for variation in historical factors, female autonomy, gender segregation, and women's right to vote.

Sara Hlupekile Longwe, a consultant on gender and development based in Lusaka, Zambia, developed The Longwe's Women Empowerment Framework (WEF) in 1995. Adopted by the United Nations, the WEF is a tool kit to achieve women's empowerment, plan and monitor the development of women-related programs and projects worldwide. It is beneficial to use the framework to evaluate and strengthen women's empowerment in policies and plans. The framework can be used to help planners question what women's empowerment and equality means in practice. There are five dimensions of WEF that emphasizes the commitment to women's empowerment and gender equality: welfare, access, conscience, participation, and control.

Other measures that calculate women's participation and relative equality include the Gender Parity Index (GPI) or the Gender-related Development Index (GDI). The GDI is a way in which the United Nations Development Program

(UNDP) measures the inequality between genders within a country. Some critique of this measurement is that, because GDI calculations rely solely on the achievement distribution between males and females of a population, GDI does not measure gender inequality; instead it measures absolute levels on income, education, and health.

A more qualitative form of assessing women's empowerment is to identify constraints to action. This allows for the identification of power relations between genders. Because this is a participatory process, it facilitates conversation on gender discrimination. Comparing constraints on women at a later time also allows for any changes or expansion to be better identified. The evaluation of the development of women's agency allows for an evaluation of actions taken. These assessments must also be based on the action taken by women, and not external groups. External groups can help facilitate women's empowerment, but cannot bestow it on them.

== Barriers ==
Many of the barriers to women's empowerment and equity are the result of cultural norms. While many women are aware of the issues posed by gender inequality, others have become accustomed to it. Many men in power are hesitant to disrupt societal norms that are unfair to women.

Research shows that the increasing access to the Internet can also result in an increased exploitation of women. Releasing personal information on websites has put some women's personal safety at risk. In 2010, Working to Halt Online Abuse stated that 73% of women were victimized through such sites. Types of victimization include cyber stalking, harassment, online pornography, flaming, and especially sexual harassment in the workplace. It occurs most frequently in business, trade, banking and finance, sales and marketing, hospitality, civil service, lecturing, teaching, and education. According to the International Labour Organisation (ILO), sexual harassment is a clear form of gender discrimination based on sex, a manifestation of unequal power relations between men and women. The UN Convention on the Elimination of All Forms of Discrimination Against Women (CEDAW) is urging for increased measures of protection for women against sexual harassment and violence in the workplace. 54% (272) had experienced some form of workplace sexual harassment. 79% of the victims are women; 21% were men.

Studies show that women face more barriers in the workplace than men. Gender-related barriers involve sexual harassment, unfair hiring practices, career progression, and unequal pay where women are paid less than men are for performing the same job. When taking the median earnings of men and women who worked full-time, year-round, government data from 2014 showed that women made $0.79 for every dollar a man earned. The average earnings for working mothers came out to even less—$0.71 for every dollar a father made, according to 2014 study conducted by the National Partnership for Women and Children. While much of the public discussion of the wage gap has focused around women getting equal pay for the same work as their male peers, many women struggle with what is called the "pregnancy penalty". or motherhood penalty. This can affect both pregnant and non-pregnant women given institutionalized views of pregnancy that question a woman's commitment. Women are put in a position where they need to make the decision of whether to maintain in the workforce or have children, which has led to the debate over maternity leave in the United States and many other countries in the world.

In March 2016, tech career website Dice released a study of more than 16,000 tech professionals that found that when equivalent education, experience and position are compared, there is no pay gap and there has not been one for the last six years.

The pursuit of gender equality remains a global challenge. With long-standing gender gaps continuing across countries in all sectors of social and economic life. The Pursuit of Gender Equality: An Uphill Battle was released at the Women's Forum in Paris to highlight the issue (according to a global OECD report). Understanding gender inequalities and removing the particular barriers are the only ways to establish a sustainable management.

There are three significant gender imbalance that pose challenges in managing a sustainable environment:

=== The effects of land rights ===
Land is important to cultural identity and ensures resources for daily survival such as food, housing and income. Despite playing a significant role in using land for food, income and household resources, women account for 13.8% of land globally. They also face numerous legal and social obstacles in all facets of their land rights (such as to sell, manage or control). This led to the reason why women find it difficult to participate in activities due to unsure land rights. According to the study by the Intergovernmental Panel on Climate Change (IPCC), women's access to land promotes investments and managements.

According to a 2023 FAO study, half the countries reporting on Sustainable Development Goal Indicator 5.a.2 have weak legal protections for women's land rights. The percentage of men who have ownership or secure tenure rights over agricultural land is twice that of women in more than 40 percent of the countries that have reported on women's landownership (Sustainable Development Goal Indicator 5.a.1), and a larger percentage of men than women have such rights in 40 of 46 countries reporting. Even so, the share of women among landowners increased in 10 of 18 countries over the last decade, with marked improvements in several countries in sub-Saharan Africa and southern Asia.

=== The effects of leadership and decision-making ===
Women's responsibilities at home make it difficult to take part and engage in decision-making. As this indicates that women's needs, priorities and skills are being ignored when managing resources and making decision. This affects empowerment in community and the power to create changes.

=== The effects of violence against women ===
Human Rights Watch claims that a lot of women all across the world are faced to toxic environment at work where they encounter a variety of unwanted sexual acts. This effects women in a long-term, from physical and mental health to public engagement. A barrier to women's growth value and a factor in the discrimination of jobs based on gender is the fear of enduring violence at work.

== Role of education ==
People engage in public debate and make demands on government for health care, social security and other entitlements. In particular, education empowers women to make choices that improve their children's health, their well-being, and chances of acquiring survival skills. Education informs others of preventing and containing a disease. Such education empowers women to make choices that can improve their welfare, including marrying beyond childhood and having fewer children. Education can increase women's awareness of their rights, boost their self-esteem, and provide them the opportunity to assert their rights.

Education is not universally available and gender inequalities persist. A major concern in many countries is not only the limited numbers of girls going to school, but also the number of educational pathways for those that step into the classroom. There are efforts to address the lower participation and learning achievement of girls in science, technology, engineering and mathematics (STEM) education.

In some parts of the world, girls and women are attacked for attending school, and societal efforts to stop this may be lacking.

Education can play many factors in literacy which is why educators and actitivists should take into consideration societal gender myths and narratives. Literacy can lead to possibility and power, but it can also lead to marginalization and disempowering people. Students usually associate the master narrative that "the more literate one is, the more successful he or she will be." This narrative embodies issues of language acquisition and literacy and may affirm culturally scripted ideas about literacy.

== Internet use ==
The Internet is often a source of empowerment for women through its creation, dispersion, and utilization of hashtags on social media. Growing Internet access in the late 20th century provided women with various tools to empower themselves. Women began to use social networking sites such as Facebook and Twitter for online activism. Through online activism, they are able to empower themselves by organizing campaigns and voicing their opinions for equality rights.

Blogging emerged as one tool for educational female empowerment. According to a study done by the University of California, Los Angeles, medical patients who read and write about their disease are often in a much happier mood and more knowledgeable than those who do not. By reading others' experiences, patients can better educate themselves and apply strategies that their fellow bloggers suggest.

With the development of e-learning technology, education became more accessible and affordable to women, enabling them to learn new skills to advance in their careers.

Examples of online activism having an impact include a 2013 online campaign which led to Facebook taking down various pages that spread hatred about women. The campaign was started by 100 female advocates. In 2017, when the #AintNoCinderella hashtag emerged, it went viral after Varnika Kundu (a 29-year-old woman in India) was driving home past midnight on August 4 when she was followed and harassed by two men in a SUV. Kundu was blamed for being out late at night, especially by the BJP government Vice-president Ranveer Bhatti. This led to women across India and other parts of the world to share pictures of themselves out late at night with the hashtag "#AintNoCinderella" to show that women do not have a particular curfew they must follow.

== Ongoing projects ==
The UN came out with a set of goals called the Sustainable Development Goals (SDGs) to help make the world a better place. Of the 17th, the fourth goal works to allow access to education for all people. A large effort has been made to include women in schools to better their education. The fifth goal focuses on empowering women and girls to achieve gender equality through equal access to various types of opportunities (health care, education, work, etc.).

=== U.S. involvement ===
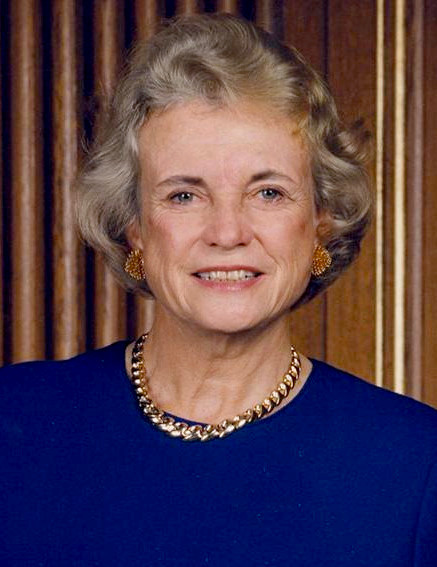
Sandra Day O'Connor, the first woman to serve as a U.S. Supreme Court justice.

Domestically, the U.S. empowered women through passing of laws such as allowing women to vote in 1920, banning discrimination based on gender in 1964, banning discrimination against pregnant women in 1978, etc. The inclusion of women in politics allowed for more gender equality. The first female speaker of House, the First Lady to run for president, first women to serve on the Supreme Court, and the first female Vice President were monumental events that provided insight into the developing social acceptance of women in power.

The U.S. provides foreign aid to third world countries in various forms, one of which is by providing education programs. There are bills in Congress that work to ensure education to girls. One is the Protecting Girls' Access to Education Act. These bills are enacted with the belief that proper education will pull girls out of poverty and reduce exploitation of them.

Another action taken on by the U.S. is the PEPFAR program, initiated by the Bush administration in 2003. The U.S. spent more than $1.4 billion in funding sub-Saharan Africa during the duration of the program. This program was taken into effect in response to the global HIV/AIDS crisis, and it promoted abstinence among young girls and women. There was a partnership with DREAMS, and its main purpose with PEPFAR was to allow both girls and women to develop into Determined, Resilient, Empowered, AIDS-free, Mentored, and Safe women. There are criticisms that this program did not do much to reduce HIV-risk behavior, and critics such as John Dietrich expressed concern that the context of aid enforced Western beliefs of choosing abstinence before marriage.

== See also ==
- Agency (sociology)
- Double burden
- Feminism
- Wahre und Falsche "Frauen-Emanzipation", an early women's rights essay
- Gender digital divide
- Girl power
- Respect
- Women empowerment in Nigeria
- Women's rights
- Women in the workforce

== Sources ==
This article incorporates text from a free content work (license statement/permission). Text taken from Cracking the code: girls' and women's education in science, technology, engineering and mathematics (STEM), 11, UNESCO.

This article incorporates text from a free content work. Licensed under CC-BY-SA IGO 3.5 (license statement/permission). Text taken from Mobile phones and literacy: Empowerment in Women's Hands; A Cross-Case Analysis of Nine Experiences, 33, UNESCO, UNESCO. UNESCO.

This article incorporates text from a free content work. Licensed under CC BY-SA 3.0 IGO. Text taken from I'd blush if I could: closing gender divides in digital skills through education, UNESCO, EQUALS Skills Coalition, UNESCO. UNESCO.

This article incorporates text from a free content work. Licensed under CC BY-SA 3.0 (license statement/permission). Text taken from Gender-responsive digitalization: A critical component of the COVID-19 response in Africa, FAO, FAO.

This article incorporates text from a free content work. Licensed under CC BY-SA 3.0 (license statement/permission). Text taken from The status of women in agrifood systems – Overview, FAO, FAO.
