= Hans Georg von Schnering =

German chemist (1931–2010)

Hans Georg von Schnering (born 6 July 1931 in Ranis, died 22 July 2010 in Aidlingen) was a German chemist and professor of inorganic chemistry at the University of Münster, honorary professor at the University of Stuttgart and director at the Max Planck Institute for Solid State Research.

== Life ==
Born in 1931 as the son of a doctor, Schnering initially trained as a baker before embarking on studying chemistry at the University of Münster in 1951. He completed his diploma thesis with Wilhelm Klemm in 1958 and his doctorate with Rudolf Hoppe two years later (title of the thesis: “Über Oxo- und Thiozincate und -cadmate”). As a doctoral candidate, he also stayed in Göttingen to learn from the crystallographer Josef Zemann. Schnering habilitated with the title "Beiträge zur Chemie binärer und ternärer Halogeno- und Oxoverbindungen der Metalle" (Contributions to the chemistry of binary and ternary halogen and oxo compounds of metals) at the University of Münster in 1964.

In 1966, he became a full professor of special inorganic chemistry at the University of Münster. In 1975, he was appointed director of the Max Planck Institute for Solid State Research in Stuttgart. Schnering died in 2010 in Aidlingen.

== Research ==
Von Schnering's areas of work were generally structural and solid-state chemistry. Special contributions have been made in the field of structural chemistry of compounds with metal-metal bonds; he laid the foundation for transition metal cluster chemistry, starting with Mo_{6} clusters found in reduced molybdenum halides. He also explored polyphosphides and -arsenides, which constitute subclasses of Zintl phases: he discovered the “Ufosane” P_{11}^{3-}, “aromatic” P_{6}^{4-}, P_{15}^{−} and P_{14}S as cutouts from “Hittorf’scher Phosphor”, or As_{8}^{8-}, an analogue of S_{8}. The chemistry of complex fluorides, hydroxides, and hydrates were also investigated by him. He also developed the Periodic Nodal Surfaces (PNS) to understand and classify solids and also to derive structure-property relationships in crystals. Furthermore, he worked on the development of the Electron Localization Function (ELF) that is nowadays an established tool to understand and visualize the bonding situation in solids.

== Selected publications ==
5 of his most important research articles follow:

- Schäfer, Harald; von Schnering, Hans Georg; Tillack, J.; Kuhnen, F.; Wöhrle, H.; Baumann, H. (1967-09-01). "Neue Untersuchungen über die Chloride des Molybdäns". Zeitschrift für Anorganische und Allgemeine Chemie. 353 (5–6): 281–310. doi:10.1002/zaac.19673530510. ISSN 0044-2313.
- von Schnering, Hans Georg (1981). "Homoatomic Bonding of Main Group Elements". Angewandte Chemie International Edition in English. 20 (1): 33–51. doi:10.1002/anie.198100331. ISSN 1521-3773.
- von Schnering, Hans Georg; Hoenle, Wolfgang (1988-01-01). "Chemistry and structural chemistry of phosphides and polyphosphides. 48. Bridging chasms with polyphosphides". Chemical Reviews. 88 (1): 243–273. doi:10.1021/cr00083a012. ISSN 0009-2665.
- von Schnering, Hans Georg; Nesper, Reinhard (1987). "How Nature Adapts Chemical Structures to Curved Surfaces". Angewandte Chemie International Edition in English. 26 (11): 1059–1080. doi:10.1002/anie.198710593. ISSN 1521-3773.
- Savin, A.; Becke, A. D.; Flad, J.; Nesper, R.; Preuss, H.; von Schnering, H. G. (1991). "A New Look at Electron Localization". Angewandte Chemie International Edition in English. 30 (4): 409–412. doi:10.1002/anie.199104091. ISSN 1521-3773.

== Awards and memberships ==
Science awards

- Alfred Stock Memorial Prize (1981)

Memberships

- Honorary doctorate sci. hc of the University of Geneva (1981)
- Honorary doctorate rer. nat. hc of the Technische Hochschule Karlsruhe
- Honorary doctorate rer. nat. hc of the University of Würzburg
- Full member of the Heidelberg Academy of Sciences and Humanities (1983)
- Member of the Academy of Sciences Leopoldina (1987)
