= Augustin Rösler =

German theologian (1851–1922)

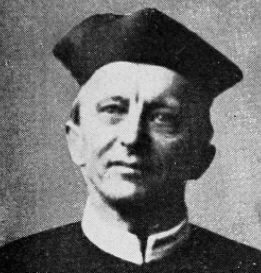
- Born: 6 March 1851; Góra, Province of Silesia
- Died: 2 April 1922 (aged 71); Wrocław, Weimar Republic
- Occupations: Theologian, sociologist

Augustin Rösler, C.Ss.R. (6 March 1851 – 2 April 1922) was a Prussian theologian and sociologist, and a Redemptorist priest, who wrote both on the history of Christianity and contemporary issues. His best known work is Die Frauenfrage vom Standpunkte der Natur, der Geschichte und der Offenbarung (transl. The Woman Question, Considered from the Standpoint of Nature, History, and Revelation), a treatise on the woman question published in 1893 (with a significantly expanded second edition in 1907).

== Personal life ==
Rösler was born in Góra on 6 March 1851.

He died in Wrocław on 2 April 1922.

== Writing ==
Augustin Rösler was the first German Catholic to discuss the woman question from a Catholic viewpoint.

Among his works is a monograph on the writing of Prudentius. In 1893, his Die Frauenfrage vom Standpunkte der Natur, der Geschichte und der Offenbarung, translated as (The Woman Question, Considered from the Standpoint of Nature, History, and Revelation) was widely reviewed. The work was a reply to August Bebel's book Die Frau und der Sozialismus. Whereas Bebel demands that women and men be treated as equals, Rösler emphasized that there is "fundamentally equal morality of the sexes," while at the same time stressing that a woman's freedom lies in her ability to fulfill her role as a mother.

In 1899, Franz Hitze invited Rösler to discuss the woman question at a conference titled Praktisch-Sozialer Kursus in Strasbourg. Rösler decided to write Wahre und Falsche "Frauen-Emanzipation," which translates to True and False Emancipation of Women, which contained the same content as the speech, but with a more detailed discussion of the topics of women at medical university courses and women's suffrage.

In Wahre und Falsche "Frauen-Emanzipation", Rösler explains his ideas of what rights women should or should not be given. The book consists of an introduction, followed by three main chapters that each focus on distinct aspects of a woman's life, and a conclusion. While explaining the problems of the Frauenfrage, also known as the woman question, Rösler bases his arguments on quotes from the Bible, metaphors or direct quotes from women or men of his time. Rösler was seen as revolutionary, because he was one of the first Catholics to criticize that women and men are not treated in a balanced way. More specifically, Rösler, on the one hand, demands that women deserve more rights than they have in certain fields, but on the other hand he argues that their rights should only be enough to help with her task as a mother and wife.

== Reception ==
Rösler's call for more rights for women, although limited, were seen as too liberal by many bishops of the time. The author's efforts to speak to other men, with the aim to free up some space for women in order to allow a more liberal development, was seen as revolutionary. Nevertheless, his traditional view on gender differences and the idea of fixating women to the task of being a loving and gentle mother and wife was criticized by many leading women of the Catholic women's movement, including Hedwig Dransfeld and Elisabeth Gnauck-Kühne. Gnauck-Kühne was a friend and correspondent of Rösler's.

== Works ==
- Rösler, Augustin (1886). Der katholische dichter Aurelius Prudentius Clemens (in German). Freiburg im Breisgau: Herder. OCLC 1121236263.
- Rösler, Augustin (1893). Die Frauenfrage vom Standpunkte der Natur, der Geschichte und der Offenbarung (in German). Vienna: Commissionsverlag und Druck von Josef Roller. OCLC 1159733005.
- Rösler, Augustin (1907, 2nd expanded edition). Die Frauenfrage vom Standpunkte der Natur, der Geschichte und der Offenbarung (in German). Freiburg im Breisgau: Herdersche Verlagshandlung, 1907.
- Rösler, Augustin (1899). Wahre und falsche Frauen-Emanzipation (in German). Stuttgart: J. Roth. OCLC 458210311. Gerritsen Collection number 2421. (Reprinted by Alphonsus-Buchhandlung in Münster in 1904). In 2023, a new edition was published in modern script, edited by Florian Schirmer.
