= Paschal Robinson =

Irish diplomat, journalist and medievalist

Paschal Robinson O.F.M.
- Apostolic Nuncio to Ireland
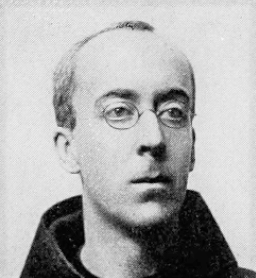
- Church: Catholic Church
- In office: 27 November 1929 – 27 August 1948
- Predecessor: Giovanni Battista Rinuccini
- Successor: Ettore Felici
- Other post: Titular Archbishop of Tyana (1927-1948)

Orders
- Ordination: 21 December 1901 by Pietro Respighi
- Consecration: 24 June 1927 by Willem Marinus van Rossum

Personal details
- Born: David Robinson; 26 April 1870 Dublin, County Dublin, United Kingdom of Great Britain and Ireland
- Died: 27 August 1948 (aged 78) Dublin, County Dublin, Ireland
- Buried: Glasnevin Cemetery
- Occupation: Diplomat, journalist
- Education: College of the Holy Cross; St. Bonaventure's College

Paschal Robinson, O.F.M., (born David Robinson; 26 April 1870 – 27 August 1948) was an Irish ecclesiastical diplomat, journalist, and medievalist. He served as the titular archbishop of Tyana and the first apostolic nuncio to Ireland since the 17th-century Archbishop Rinuccini. Influential in his position, he served as nuncio from January 1930 until his death in 1948.

== Early life ==
"Hitler Didn't Like This Photo" The Milwaukee Journal proclaimed on 15 March 1935. (The photograph was manipulated for clarity by the paper at the time of publication.) The photograph was the source of international discussion as the cause of von Dehn-Schmidt's dismissal from diplomatic service to Nazi Germany.

Born David Robinson in Ireland on 26 April 1870 and raised in the United States, Robinson was the son of a journalist and began his career as a teenager in that same field. Although he briefly considered a career in law, he had served as both London correspondent for The New York Sun and as associate editor of the North American Review before he decided to pursue the Catholic priesthood as a Franciscan.

== Career ==
Robinson studied at the Jesuit College of the Holy Cross (1895) and the Franciscan St. Bonaventure University (1896), becoming a Franciscan in August 1896, and being sent by the Franciscans to study in Rome under his new name, Paschal. He became a priest at St. Anthony's International College in Rome on 21 December 1901. In 1902, he received the Degree of Doctor of Sacred Theology and began to teach. He worked in and studied at various universities around the world and undertook a research project in Jerusalem. He also published; his first book was The Real St. Francis, released in 1903. There followed in the next seven years: Some Pages of Franciscan History (1905), The Writings of St. Francis (1906) and The Life of St. Clare (1910). He was associate editor of the Archivum Franciscanum Historicum and contributed to the Catholic Encyclopedia. By 1914, the year he was inducted into the Royal Historical Society, he was known as "one of the foremost living historians of the Middle Ages", a specialty he cultivated while at Oxford University.

In 1913, he was appointed Professor of Medieval History at The Catholic University of America in Washington D.C., a position he held from 1913 to 1919, when the Holy See took him into a diplomatic service in Rome. He served as apostolic visitor for the Holy See several times, first in 1920 to the Custodian of the Holy Land in Jerusalem, and again in 1925 to the Latin Patriarchate in Jerusalem and the Eastern Catholic Churches in Palestine, Transjordan, and Cyprus. He served as the titular archbishop of Tyana from May 1927 before, in December 1929, the pope appointed him the first apostolic nuncio to Ireland since the 17th-century Archbishop Giovanni Battista Rinuccini.

In 1930, he began his service as nuncio, arriving in January to a three-day celebration. In 1934, a photographer captured the German Envoy to Ireland, Georg von Dehn-Schmidt, kissing Robinson's episcopal ring. Von Dehn-Schmidt was immediately recalled and removed from diplomatic service by Adolf Hitler for unbecoming conduct, and the photograph – and word of its repercussions – spread internationally.

Robinson exerted tremendous influence in Ireland during his term and is credited in The Irish Times as having helped secure good relations between Ireland the Holy See. He remained in office until his death on 27 August 1948, at the Apostolic Nunciature in Dublin. In keeping with his wishes, he was buried in the section reserved for the Friars Minor in Glasnevin Cemetery.

== Works ==
- The Real Saint Francis of Assisi, Catholic Truth Society, 1904.
- The Writings of Saint Francis of Assisi, The Dolphin Press, 1906.
- A Short Introduction to Franciscan Literature, Tennant and Ward, 1907.
- The Golden Sayings of Blessed Brother Giles of Assisi, The Dolphin Press, 1907.
