= Góra =

Town in Lower Silesian Voivodeship, Poland

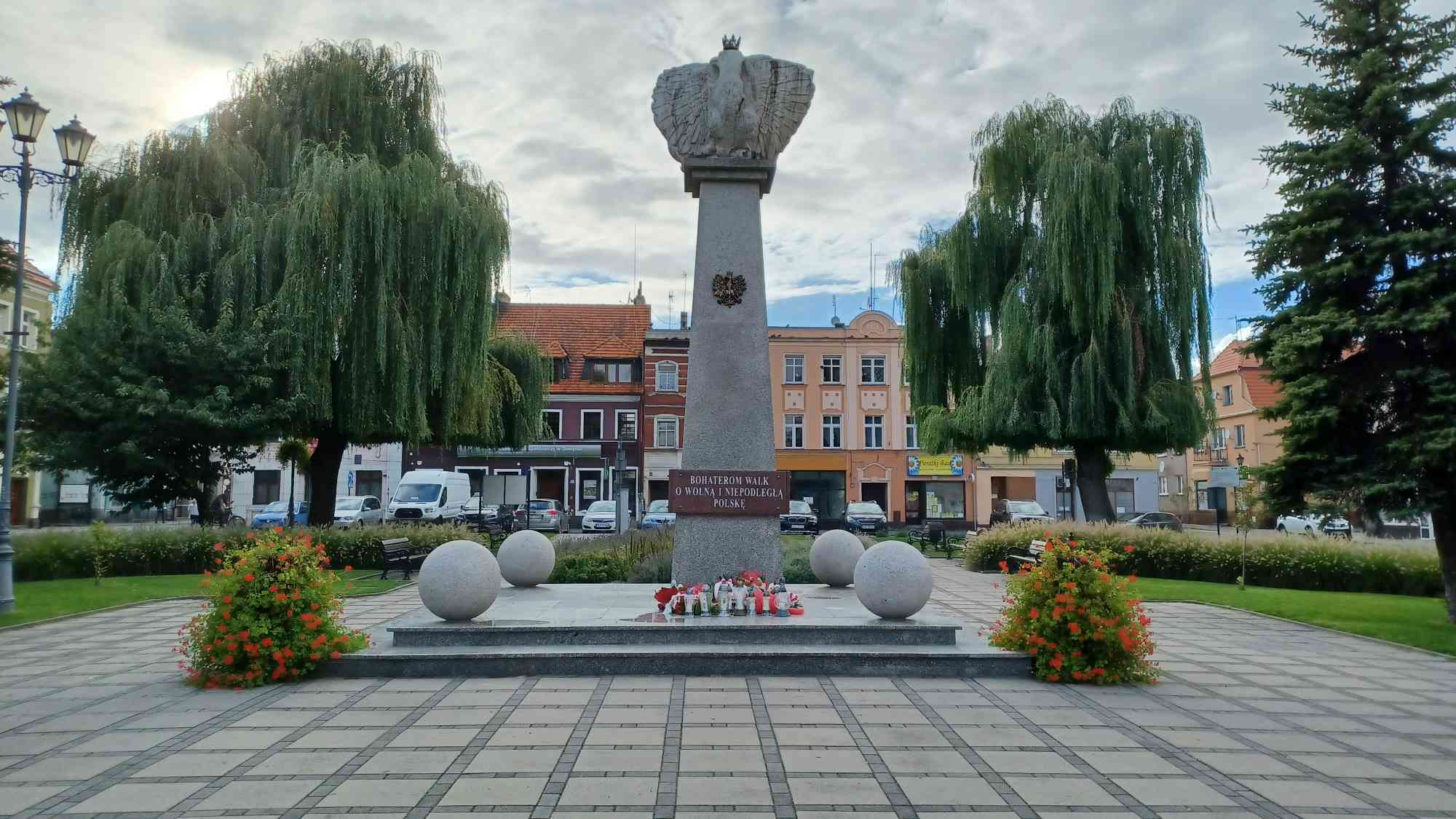
- Rynek (Market Square) with monument to the heroes of the struggle for independent Poland

- Flag Coat of arms

- Location within Poland
- Coordinates: 51°40′N 16°33′E
- Country: Poland
- Lower Silesian: Lower Silesian
- County: Góra
- Gmina: Góra
- First mentioned: 1155

Government
  - Mayor: Irena Krzyszkiewicz

Area
  - Total: 13.65 km^{2} (5.27 sq mi)

Population (2019-06-30)
  - Total: 11,797
  - Density: 864.2/km^{2} (2,238/sq mi)
- Time zone: UTC+1 (CET)
  - Summer (DST): UTC+2 (CEST)
- Postal code: 56-200
- Vehicle registration: DGR
- Website: http://www.gora.com.pl

Góra ([ˈɡura]; German: Guhrau) is a town in Lower Silesian Voivodeship, in western Poland. It is the administrative seat of both Góra County and of the smaller district (gmina) called Gmina Góra. The town is located within the historic Lower Silesia region. As of 2019, it had a population of 11,797.

== History ==
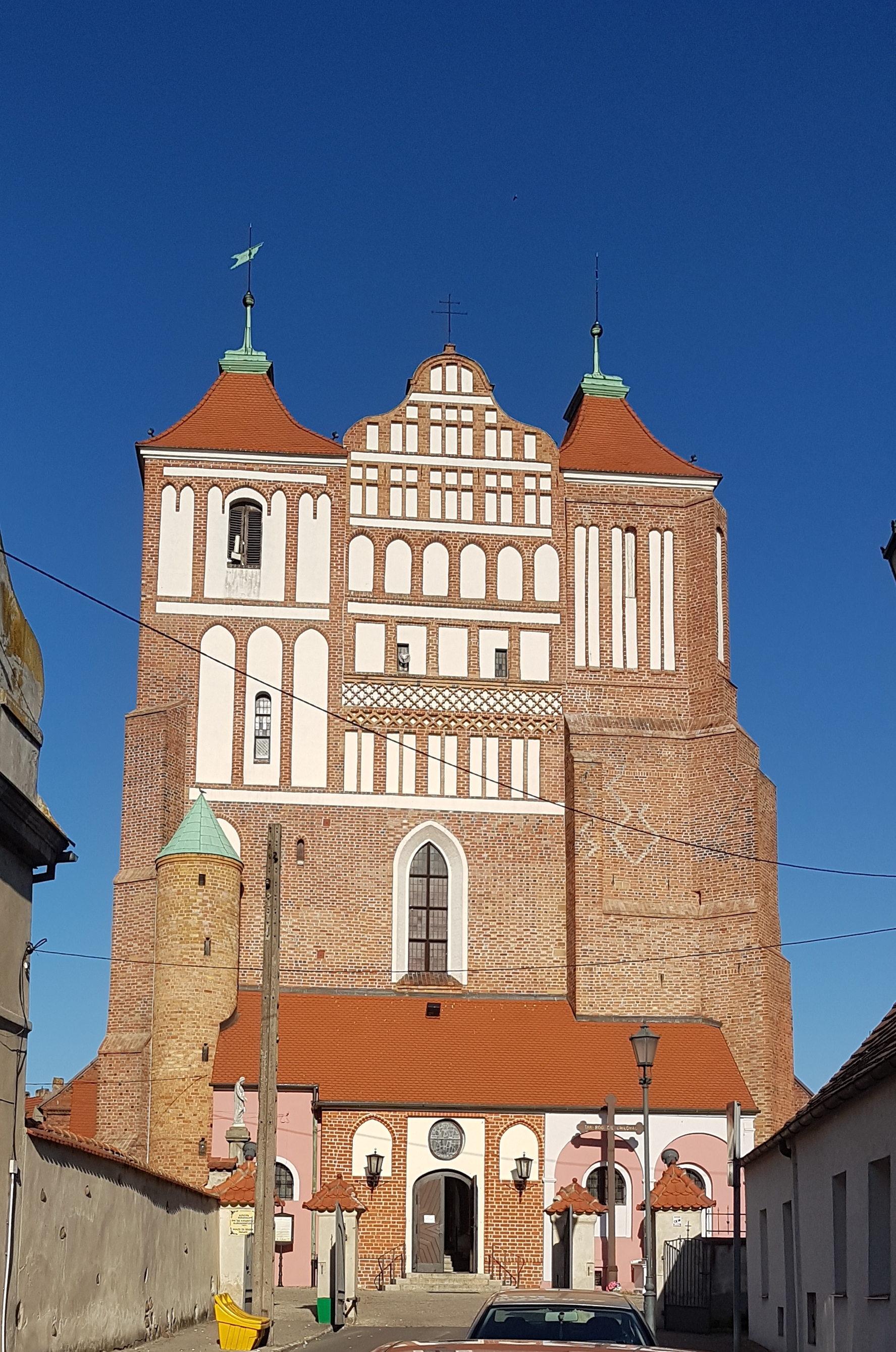
Gothic Church of St. Catherine

The area became part of the emerging Polish state in the 10th century. After Poland fragmented into smaller provincial duchies, the area initially belonged to Greater Poland before becoming part of Silesia. The settlement was first mentioned as Gora in an 1155 deed by Pope Adrian IV conveying the property to the Diocese of Wrocław. The name of the town means "hill" or "mountain" in Polish. In 1256 the bishop of Wrocław Tomasz I gave the village to the Polish knight Gosław. In 1288 it became part of the Duchy of Głogów and was granted Magdeburg town rights by the Piast duke Henry III. In 1300, Henry III sold the local mint to the city council of Góra. Henry III, as well as the succeeding dukes Henry IV the Faithful and Konrad I granted new privileges to the town in 1306 and 1310. Particularly, in 1310, 33 neighboring villages were assigned to the town to create an administrative district called Weichbild. From the 14th century onwards, the town developed into a centre of cloth manufacturing, and specific privileges were granted to the clothiers of Góra in 1304. The Germanized name Guhrau is first documented in 1336. In 1343, an annual fair was established. Also from that year comes the first mention of the existence of a parish school in Góra. The town remained under the rule of the Polish houses of Piast and Jagiellon as part of the duchies of Głogów, Ścinawa and Cieszyn until the 16th century.

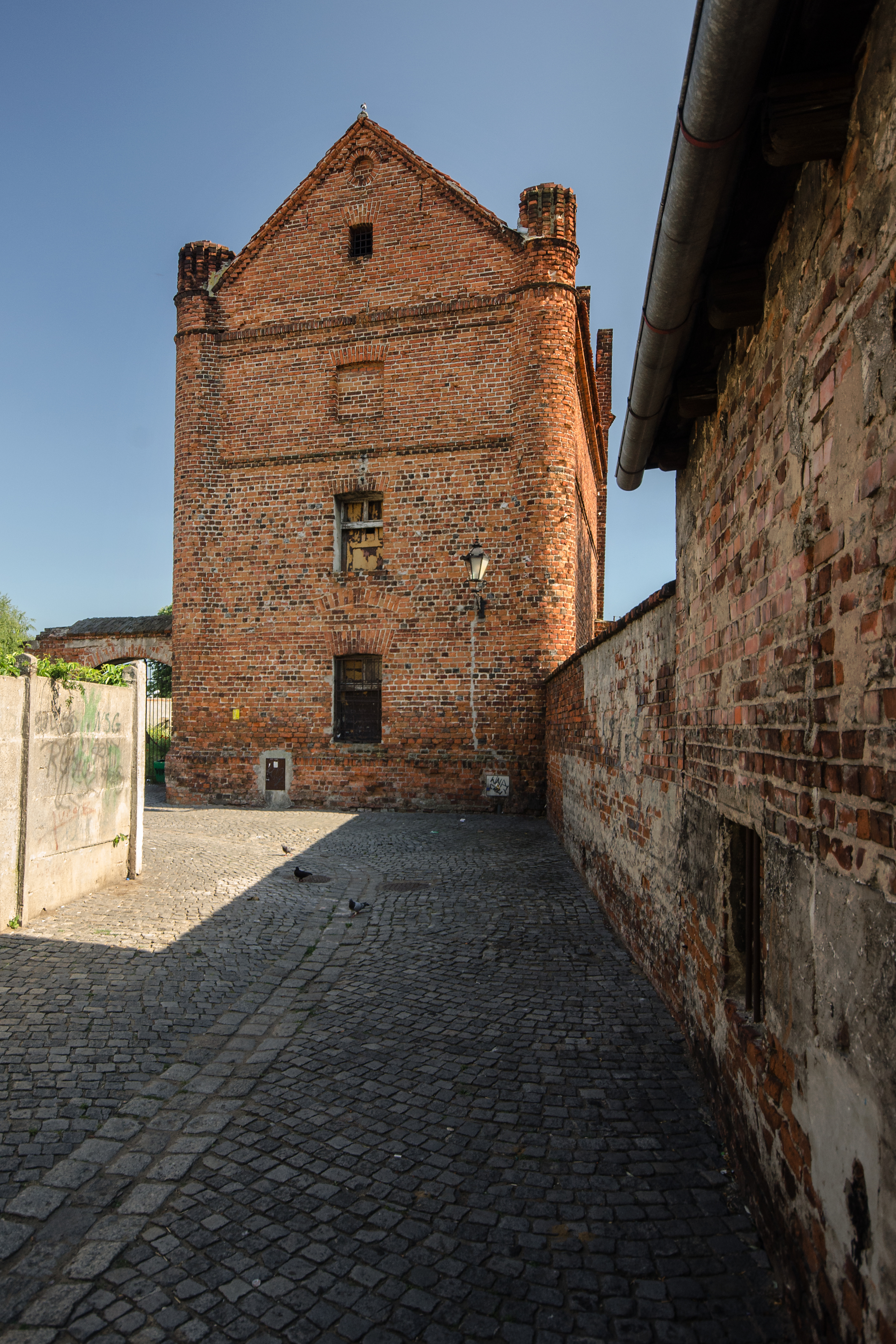
Medieval castle tower

The town Guhrau was annexed by Prussia upon the First Silesian War in 1742 and from 1816 was the administrative seat of Landkreis Guhrau within the Province of Silesia, which from 1871 to 1945 was also part of Germany. In World War II it was occupied by the Red Army during the 1945 Vistula–Oder Offensive. According to the Potsdam Agreement, the town became again part of Poland, although with a Soviet-installed communist regime, which stayed in power until the 1980s, while the remaining German population was expelled. The historic name Góra was restored and the town was repopulated by Poles, expelled from former eastern Poland annexed by the Soviet Union. Again a county seat from 1946, from 1975 to 1998 Góra belonged to Leszno Voivodeship. In 1999 Góra's town limits were expanded by including the settlement of Sędziwojowice as its eastern district.

== Notable people ==
- Wilhelm Adolph (1729–1781), German composer
- Benno Erdmann (1851–1921), German philosopher
- Augustin Rösler (1851–1922), German theologian
- Georg von Dehn-Schmidt (1876-1937), German diplomat
- Wilhelm Klemm (1896–1985), German scientist
- Werner Naumann (1909–1982), German Nazi Secretary of State
- Paweł Tuchlin (1946–1987), Polish serial killer known as “Scorpion”
- Izabella Sierakowska (1946–2021), Polish politician
- Radosław Kałużny (born 1974), Polish football player

== Twin towns – sister cities ==
See twin towns of Gmina Góra.
