= Wilhelm Adolph =

German composer (1729–1781)

- Born: Wilhelm Balthasar Adolph; 1729; Góra (Guhrau), Archduchy of Austria
- Died: 1781 (aged 51–52); Góra (Guhrau), Kingdom of Prussia
- Occupation: Composer

Wilhelm Balthasar Adolph (1729–1781) was a German composer of liturgical music in galant style, cantor and rector (schoolmaster) of catholic parish schools in Świebodzin and Góra.

== Biography ==
Born a son of Andreas Joseph Adolph (Adolff), municipal treasury bookkeeper and salt merchant, later lay judge and associate judge in Góra (Guhrau), and Anna Catharina, daughter of Sebastian Gräbner, city surgeon and town councillor in Góra as well as treasurer of the town's parish church. In 1748 he became cantor (and probably at the same time rector) of the Roman Catholic Church of Saint Michael the Archangel in Świebodzin (Germ. Schwiebus). Soon afterwards he married Anna Rosina Lange (d. after 1781), daughter of Anton Frantz Lange, customs collector in Zielona Góra (Germ. Grünberg) and Cistercian nuns’ of Trzebnica (Germ. Trebnitz) estates’ administrator. They had five children. The earliest manuscript of his work (copy of Litaniae de BMV) dates back to this period of his life, from 1757. In 1766 the composer moved with his family to his own family town, Góra. Appointed conrector and cantor of the school by the Roman Catholic Church of St Catherine of Alexandria in Góra. Soon he became rector (noted as one in 1768 already and praised in documents as industrious). He was actively involved in the cultural life of the town as evident from wages recorded in parish accounts concerning musical settings of several religious services. He died in 1781 leaving a two-year vacancy on his post.

He authored four works for choir and small instrumental ensemble all surviving in single manuscript copies:

1. Litaniae de Beata Virgine Maria sub titulo Mater Divin[a]e Gratiae (before 1757)
2. Missa ex C (possible autograph copy, before 1766)
3. Missa [in D]
4. Vesperae in F (possible autograph copy)

He is a composer of galant style. His pieces were written for three or four-part choir (with solo parts) and instrumental ensemble based on church trio (Germ. Kirchentrio) – two violins and basso continuo, sometimes enlarged with viola or a pair of brass instruments (horns, clarini). His works follow cantata form with a prominent role of concerto technique and solo parts.
