= Wilhelm Klemm =

Wilhelm Karl Klemm
- Born: 5 January 1896; Guhrau, Lower Silesia, German Empire (now Góra, Poland)
- Died: 24 October 1985 (aged 89); Gdańsk, Poland
- Education: Breslau University; Technische Hochschule Hannover
- Known for: Magnetochemistry, Ytterbium, Zintl-Klemm concept
- Spouse(s): Dr. Lisabeth Klemm "Li" (nee Herrmann, 9 October 1895, Eberswalde - 15 October 1948, Kiel), 1924-1948; Lina Arndt, 1949-1985.
- Awards: Liebig Medal (1951); Centenary Prize (1958)
- Scientific career
- Fields: Inorganic and physical chemistry
- Workplaces: Westfälische Wilhelms-Universität Münster, Christian-Albrechts-Universität zu Kiel, Technische Hochschule Danzig, Technische Hochschule Hannover
- Doctoral advisor: Heinrich Biltz (1923), Wilhelm Biltz (1927)
- Doctoral students: Rudolf Hoppe

Wilhelm Karl Klemm (5 January 1896 – 24 October 1985) was an inorganic and physical chemist. Klemm did extensive work on intermetallic compounds, rare earth metals, transition elements and compounds involving oxygen and fluorine. He and Heinrich Bommer were the first to isolate elemental erbium (1934) and ytterbium (1936). Klemm refined Eduard Zintl's ideas about the structure of intermetallic compounds and their connections to develop the Zintl-Klemm concept.

Klemm co-authored one of the ten most-cited papers in the history of the journal Zeitschrift für anorganische und allgemeine Chemie. His textbooks on inorganic chemistry became standard works for chemists. His Magnetochemie (c1936) is considered foundational to magnetochemistry. Anorganische Chemie (Inorganic Chemistry) by Klemm and Rudolf Hoppe has been described as a legendary work by two titans of solid state chemistry.

Klemm was the second President of the Gesellschaft Deutscher Chemiker (GDCh), serving from 1952 to 1953. He was President of the International Union of Pure and Applied Chemistry (IUPAC) from 1965 to 1967. Klemm co-edited the journal Zeitschrift für anorganische und allgemeine Chemie from 1939 to 1965. Since 1985, the GDCh has awarded the Wilhelm Klemm Prize in his honor.

== Education ==
Klemm was born on 5 January 1896 in Guhrau, Lower Silesia to Wilhelm and Ottilie (John) Klemm. His father was a master carpenter and furniture manufacturer. Klemm attended the Realgymnasium in Grünberg before serving in the German army from 1914 to 1919. He was an army liaison in Turkey, where he learned Turkish and Arabic.

From 1919 to 1923 Klemm studied chemistry at University of Breslau. In 1923, Klemm received a doctor of philosophy degree. Heinrich Biltz supervised Klemm's dissertation on the chemistry of uric acid, entitled Aus der Chemie der Harnsäure (1923).

In December 1924 Klemm married Lisabeth Herrmann, who had studied chemistry at Danzig (Gdańsk) and at Breslau University with Heinrich Biltz. She received her degree in 1921, completing a doctoral thesis magna cum laude on the methylation of uric acid and its methyl derivatives. Her father was a forestry scientist. The Klemms formed a community of which Lisbeth Klemm was the social center, and Wilhelm was the intellectual center.

Heinrich Biltz recommended Klemm to his brother Wilhelm Biltz, who had begun teaching at the Technische Hochschule Hannover in 1921. Klemm habilitated there in the field of inorganic chemistry in 1927.

He was an enthusiastic, inspiring, hard worker, untiring, with unbelievable diligence and determination. – Rudolf Hoppe

== Career ==
=== Technische Universität Hannover ===
From 1927 to 1929 Klemm worked as a Privatdozent at the Technische Hochschule Hannover. In 1929 he was promoted to the position of associate professor.

=== Düsseldorf ===
Klemm was reportedly a Professor for inorganic chemistry in Düsseldorf at some time between 1929 and 1933.

=== Technische Hochschule Danzig ===
As of 1 April 1933, Klemm became a full professor and head of the Department of Inorganic Chemistry at the Technische Hochschule Danzig. Klemm replaced Hans Joachim von Wartenberg, who had taught at the Technische Hochschule Danzig from 1913 to 1932 and served in several senior positions including head of the Department of Inorganic Chemistry. Von Wartenberg left in August 1932 to become director of the Institute of Inorganic Chemistry at the University of Göttingen.

The Technische Hochschule Danzig was at that time located in the Free City of Danzig (1920-1939). The population of the city was predominantly German and faculty and staff tended to align with National Socialism even before 1933. The attitudes of scientists at the university have been described in terms of "shades of gray".

Klemm had some involvement with the National Socialists but his motives are not known. Klemm was not a signatory of the Bekenntnis der Professoren an den deutschen Universitäten (1933). He did sign the later Aufstellung zu den Unterzeichnern des Appells „An die Gebildeten der Welt“ (11. November 1933), a list of academics who professed support for Adolf Hitler and National Socialism. Klemm became a member of the NSDAP (Nazi Party) in 1938, rather later than contemporaries like Adolf Butenandt.

Following the Invasion of Poland which began 1 September 1939, the Free City of Danzig was annexed by Germany, and anti-Jewish measures escalated. In a letter to the editorial staff of Chemische Berichte in June 1942 Klemm argued that contributions from chemist Georg-Maria Schwab and other "non-Aryan" authors should not appear in German chemical journals.

Klemm served as head of the Inorganic Chemistry department of the Technische Hochschule Danzig from 1933 to 1945, and was its last vice-rector. He was responsible for the evacuation of equipment, books, files, and people in 1944–1945, in advance of Soviet troops. Approximately 500 books and pieces of equipment and 300 staff and family members sailed on the ship Deutschland on 27 January 1945 bound for Kiel.

Much of the university including the chemistry building was destroyed in subsequent months. Following the war Gdańsk became part of Poland. On 24 March 1945, the university was re-established as a Polish institution.

=== Christian-Albrechts-Universität zu Kiel ===
During the period of denazification following the war, Nazi party members and others who were more than nominal participants in Nazi activities were barred from public posts. Those applying for academic positions had to certify their acceptability.

Klemm was the lead author for the preparation and publication of the six inorganic chemistry volumes of the FIAT review of German science, 1939-1946 (1948-1949). FIAT volumes were compiled by leading German scientists in cooperation with the Military Government for Germany, involving Field Information Agencies Technical from the British, French, and U.S. zones, to report on the scientific work done in Germany during the war years.

From 23 May 1947 to 1951, Klemm led the Inorganic Chemical Institute at University of Kiel (Christian-Albrechts-Universität zu Kiel). The Institute of Inorganic Chemistry at the University of Kiel has a collection of correspondence and other papers dating from 1947 through the 1960s, relating to Wilhelm Klemm and his successor, Robert Juza.

Klemm's first wife, Lisabeth Klemm (née Herrmann, born 9 October 1895, Eberswalde) died of cancer on 15 October 1948 in Kiel. In 1949, Klemm married Lina Arndt, a dentist who had been a friend of his first wife.

=== Westfälische Wilhelms-Universität Münster ===
By 1951, the Allied Powers were lifting reemployment restrictions against Nazi party members, and it became easier for academics to find or change positions. Klemm accepted a position as professor and department head at the Westfälische Wilhelms-Universität Münster where he remained from 1951 until he retired as professor emeritus in 1964. The university was in need of substantial rebuilding after the war. Klemm headed the Institute of Inorganic and Analytical Chemistry. As rector of the Westfälische Wilhelms-Universität Münster from 1957 to 1958, Klemm founded its Natural Science Center. He also served as vice-rector from 1958 to 1960.

== Scientific contributions ==
Klemm's scientific work focused on the systematic investigation of solids, to understand the properties of substances and how they related to the substances' atomic arrangement. At a very early stage he recognized the importance of physical methods including crystal structure analysis using X-ray diffraction and magnetochemical measurements for the investigation of solids. His paper with Wilhelm Biltz, "Über die Elektrolytische Leitfähigkeit geschmolzenen Scandiumchlorids"(About the electrolytic conductivity of molten scandium chloride, 1923) became one of the ten most-cited papers in the history of the journal Zeitschrift für anorganische und allgemeine Chemie.

Klemm has been described as the founder of modern magnetochemistry for introducing new methods in the 1920s and describing them in detail in his 1936 book, Magnetochemie. It is considered a "pioneering textbook" and the foundation of much subsequent work in the field.

Klemm's areas of focus included the intermetallic compounds, rare earth metals, transition elements and compounds involving oxygen and fluorine. His work on the properties of rare elements such as gallium, germanium, indium, rhenium and related compounds was considered authoritative. He was particularly interested in the synthesis of compounds involving unusual degrees of oxidation, and the comparison of compounds with similar structure in order to better understand their properties.

Klemm studied molar volumes and coefficients of expansion of both fused and solid halides. He also examined indium, gallium, germanium, and rhenium, and rare earth elements, determining their heats of formation and studying their reactivity with ammonia.

In 1936, Wilhelm Klemm and Anna Neuber published research on the magnetic properties of triphenylchromium compounds. Their magnetic susceptibility (approx. 1.73 Bohr magnetons) was found to be inconsistent with the structure determination proposed by Franz Hein for penta-, tetra- and triphenylchromium compounds.

In 1934, Wilhelm Klemm and Heinrich Bommer were the first to achieve pure erbium, by heating erbium chloride with potassium. In 1936, Wilhelm Klemm and Heinrich Bommer were the first to isolate elemental ytterbium by reducing ytterbium (III) chloride with potassium at 250 °C. They also determined the crystal structure and magnetic properties of the metal. Klemm's work on transition metal oxides, fluorides and lanthanides was interrupted in 1939 by World War II.

The research school of Wilhem Klemm (1896-1985) in Danzig specialized in the making of series of oxide and fluorine crystals by slightly changing the chemical composition from one compound to the following in the series. They played around with chemical structures like J. S. Bach made musical variations on a theme in The Art of Fugue - Rudolf Hoppe

Klemm's research led to the identification of systematic relationships among the elements of the periodic system. It also led to a new method for classifying rare earths based on the stability of both completely filled and "half-filled" electrons which could be applied to both ions and metals.

Klemm identified unusual oxidation states in oxo- and fluoro- complexes and refined the ideas of Eduard Zintl on the structure of intermetallic compounds to develop the Zintl-Klemm concept.

One of Klemm's students and coworkers was Rudolf Hoppe. Hoppe worked with Klemm on fluorides, and in 1962 produced the first noble gas compounds.

== Textbooks ==
Over the course of his career, Klemm wrote and co-wrote a number of textbooks on inorganic chemistry which became standard textbooks in the field, repeatedly reprinted and translated. These include:

- Klemm, Wilhelm, Anorganische chemie (c1935). Berlin, Leipzig, W. de Gruyter & co.
- Klemm, Wilhelm, Magnetochemie (c1936) Leipzig, Akademische Verlagsgesellschaft m.b.H. Considered a foundational text in magnetochemistry.
- Biltz, Heinrich, Klemm, Wilhelm and Fischer, Werner. Experimentelle Einführung in die anorganische Chemie (1937), Berlin, Leipzig, Walter de Gruyter & Co. An introduction to inorganic chemistry using experimental methods. Beginning with the 21st edition in 1937, Heinrich Biltz was joined by co-authors Wilhelm Klemm and Werner Fischer. Their new version of the textbook became so well known that it was referred to as "BKF". At least 73 editions were published.
- Klemm, Wilhelm, and Hoppe, Rudolf. Anorganische Chemie (c1979). Berlin; Boston : De Gruyter, c1979. Anorganische Chemie by Klemm and Rudolf Hoppe has been described as a legendary work by two titans of solid state chemistry.

== Organizational contributions ==
Klemm was a member of the Academy of Sciences Leopoldina (Deutsche Akademie der Naturforscher Leopoldina) in Halle, Germany; the Bavarian Academy of Sciences and Humanities (Bayerische Akademie der Wissenschaften) in Munich, Germany; the Göttingen Academy of Sciences (Akademie der Wissenschaften zu Göttingen) in Göttingen, Germany; and the Rhine-Westphalian Academy of Sciences in Düsseldorf, Germany.

Klemm was co-editor of Zeitschrift für anorganische und allgemeine Chemie (the journal for inorganic and general chemistry) from 1939 to 1965.

From 1945 onwards, his central tasks were to reestablish teaching and research in Kiel (1947-1951) and in Münster (1951-) and to help reconstruct chemical institutions at the national and international levels.

Wilhelm Klemm was an influential science organizer. He became the second president of the Gesellschaft Deutscher Chemiker (1952-1953), working to foster communication between chemists in different zones of post-war Germany. In the 1950s and 1960s, he worked to build communication and cohesion between scientists in the GDR and the Federal Republic. As president of the GDCh he participated in the founding of the Chemical Society of the GDR, formally created on 11 May 1953.

Wilhelm Klemm campaigned for international exchange in the sciences. From 1965 to 1967 he was President of the International Union of Pure and Applied Chemistry (IUPAC). He was the first German scientist to fill such a high international position after World War II.

In 1966 he became the secretary-treasurer of the recently formed Committee on Data for Science and Technology (CODATA) of the International Council of Scientific Unions (ICSU), whose purpose was to encourage the use of international standards of scientific nomenclature, symbols, constants, and data sets. He served on the committee from 1968 to 1975, also holding the position of vice-president.

== Philanthropy ==
On 8 July 1977 Wilhelm and Lina Klemm signed a will describing their intention to use the revenue from the eventual sale of their home at Theresiengrund 22 for scholarships for students to travel and present their research internationally.

Lina Klemm died on 4 April 1985. Wilhelm Klemm died on 24 October 1985 while visiting Gdańsk for the first time since the war, to receive commemorative medal no. 467 from the Gdańsk University of Technology. His body was returned to Münster, where he is buried in the Münster Central Cemetery, ID 186397208.

The first scholarships of the Wilhelm-Klemm-Stiftung were awarded in 1987.

== Awards and honors ==
- 1951, Liebig Medal (Liebig-Denkmünze), Gesellschaft Deutscher Chemiker (Society of German Chemists)
- 1953, Moissan-Médaille, École nationale supérieure de chimie de Paris
- 1958, Centenary Prize, Royal Society of Chemistry
- 1963, Carl-Duisberg-Plakette, Gesellschaft Deutscher Chemiker, "In recognition of his successful cooperation in German and international organizations, through which he has made a decisive contribution to the reputation of German chemistry abroad".
- 1965, Lavoisier Medal, Société Chimique de France
- 1966, Großes Verdienstkreuz/Commander's Cross of the Order of Merit of the Federal Republic of Germany
- 1980, Festschrift, The Journal of the Less-Common Metals published an issue in honor of his 85th birthday, which occurred on 5 January 1981.
- 1981, title of Honourable Senator, University of Münster, in recognition of contributions to the rebuilding of the university.
- honorary doctorates from the Polytechnic in Darmstadt, University of Bordeaux, University of Dijon, University of Lille
- Wilhelm-Klemm-Straße in Münster is named in Klemm's honor. It is part of the university and is the site of the Physics building.
- 1985, first award of the Wilhelm Klemm Prize, given by the GDCh in his honor.
- 1995, first award of the Maria Skłodowska-Curie and Wilhelm Klemm Lectureship Award, a collaborative initiative of the Polish and German Chemical Societies to give invited joint lectures.

== Additional sources ==
- Bibliography: "VerSffentlichungen - W. Klemm". Journal of the Less-Common Metals. 76: x–xx. 1980.
- Goubeau, Josef. (1961) "Wilhelm Klemm." In Zeitschrift für Elektrochemie. Berichte der Bunsengesellschaft für Physikalische Chemie. 65, p. 105.
- King RB 2004, 'The metallurgist's periodic table and the Zintl-Klemm concept', in DH Rouvray DH & RB King (eds), The periodic table: into the 21st century, Institute of Physics Publishing, Philadelphia, ISBN 978-0-86380-292-8, pp. 189–206.
- Miller GJ, Schmidt MW, Wang F & You T-S 2011, 'Quantitative Advances in the Zintl-Klemm Formalism,' in TF Fässler (ed), Zintl Phases: Principles and Recent Developments, Springer-Verlag, Berlin, pp. 1 56, ISBN 978-3-642-21149-2
- Klemm W 1950, 'Einige probleme aus der physik und der chemie der halbmetalle und der metametalle', Angewandte Chemie, vol. 62, no. 6, pp. 133–42
