= Kenneth Spencer Research Library =

Public Library at the University of Kansas

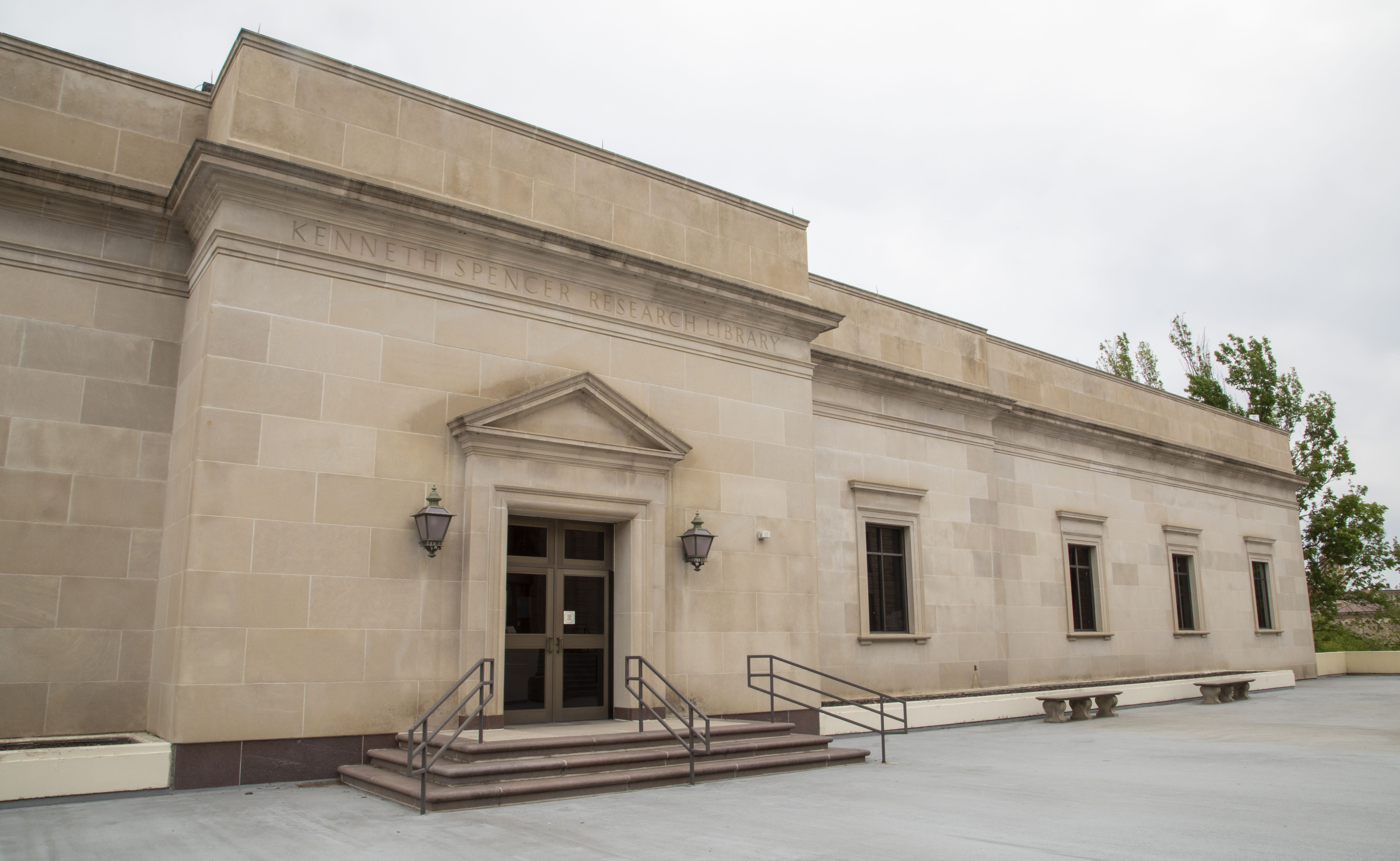
- 38.959034°N 95.247573°W
- Location: Lawrence, KS, United States
- Type: Academic library
- Established: 1968 (58 years ago)
- Branch of: University of Kansas Libraries

Collection
- Items collected: Books, journals, newspapers, magazines, maps, prints, and manuscripts

Access and use
- Population served: University of Kansas faculty, staff, and students; worldwide

Other information
- Director: Beth Whittaker
- Website: spencer.lib.ku.edu

The Kenneth Spencer Research Library is a library at the University of Kansas (KU) in Lawrence. Completed and dedicated in 1968, the library houses special collections materials including rare books, maps, archives, and photographs. The library is open to members of the public and is not limited to students and faculty members at KU.

== History ==
In 1949, Kenneth and Helen Spencer established a foundation in Kansas City for charitable giving in the region. Over the course of thirty years, the Foundation donated millions of dollars to universities, museums, and other cultural institutions in the Kansas City area and across the Midwest. Helen became president and director of the foundation following Kenneth's death in 1960 (she held these positions until the dissolution of the foundation in 1979).

Shortly after Kenneth Spencer's death in 1960, Helen was approached about donating her husband's personal papers and business records to the University of Kansas. She agreed, and by October 1964, attention turned to how and where the materials would be housed as a special memorial library. KU's Watson Library was deemed unsuitable, as the facility's lack of space already hindered librarians' efforts to process and make available special collections materials.

"Upon reflecting on this," Helen later recalled, "and knowing that a university gains prominence through its Graduate College, I was inspired to give this graduate research library." Helen was also inspired to establish the library so as to help combat the exodus of scholars from the Lawrence area, writing, "Kenneth and I had so often observed and regretted the loss of talented native Kansans to other larger eastern and western graduate schools because most of them found employment in those areas and never returned to the Middle West."

In January 1966, Helen donated funds to the University of Kansas for the construction of a library in honor of her late husband Kenneth. Helen's gift was, at the time, the largest single gift ever given to KU or to any institution in Kansas. When the gift was announced, Chancellor W. Clarke Wescoe declared that the library "will stand as a living memorial not only to an outstanding man and his equally distinguished wife but to the pursuit of learning that holds so much promise for the future and to the spirit of philanthropy which holds out for the University of Kansas the promise of future greatness."

Construction of the library began in January 1967. The library was dedicated on November 8, 1968, and it officially opened a month later. More than 150,000 books and 250,000 manuscripts were moved from Watson Library to Spencer, allowing KU to bring together previously scattered special collections as well as grow the collections and establish new services.

== Building ==
The Kenneth Spencer Research Library encompasses 100,000 square feet and is four-stories tall. The building was designed by the Tanner & Linscott architect Robert F. Jenks and built by B.A. Green Construction Co., which was based out of Lawrence. According to Alexandra Mason, a librarian who worked at the library, the structure was created "specifically to meet the needs of rare books, manuscripts, archives, and their users".

In mid-to-late 2017, the library renovated its North Gallery.

== Collections ==
The Kenneth Spencer Research Library is home to collections in many subject areas:

- University Archives: The University Archives, which were established in 1969 to serve as the official collection of the university, focus on preserving all documents pertaining to the history of KU. The collection comprises over 25,000 boxes of "papers, correspondence, reports, publications, scrapbooks, and student records along with more than one million photographs and thousands of reels of movie film, video, and audio recordings."
- Kansas Collection: The Kansas Collection dates back to 1891, when the university's first librarian, Carrie Watson, purchased 100 volumes of Kansas history from the Baldwin City minister J. W. D. Anderson. Today, the collection focuses mostly on the history of Kansas and the region from the territorial period of the 1850s to the present. The emphasis of the collection is documenting Kansans’ everyday lives and experiences, which are revealed through personal and family letters, diaries, scrapbooks, writings, newspaper clippings, and photographs. Other records of businesses, churches, schools, and organizations provide evidence of community history and social life.
- African American Experience Collection: Since the 1980s, the Kenneth Spencer Research Library strives to document the history and contributions of African Americans in Kansas and the Midwest region. Staff members partner with African American communities around the state to ensure that their history is preserved and available for study. Significant collections of personal and family papers, as well as records of organizations, churches and businesses, attesting to this rich heritage have been acquired and made available for research.
- Wilcox Collection: Established in 1965 by Laird Wilcox, the Wilcox Collection of Contemporary Political Movements is one of the biggest collections of extremist left- and right-wing political literature in the United States. According to the University itself, the collection includes thousands of "pamphlets, books, newsletters, audio recordings, and political ephemera such as bumper stickers, posters, flyers, organizational membership mailings, [and] book catalogs, relating to some 10,000 organizations at the fringes of the political spectrum."
- Special Collections: Spencer's Special Collections consist of rare books and manuscripts from around the world. Significant collections include holdings in Irish, Latin American, ornithological, New American poetry, science fiction, and 18th century materials, as well as medieval manuscripts and fragments.
- The Gerritsen Collection includes over 4,700 books, pamphlets and periodicals collected by Dutch physician and feminist Aletta Jacobs and was purchased by the university in 1954. It is a valuable reference for women's studies containing works in fifteen languages, spanning the period from the 16th to the 20th centuries. Though it includes a large collection of material related to women's suffrage, as well as anti-suffrage, other areas of focus are women's education, employment, legal status, prostitution, as well as biographical and literary works by and about women.

=== Exhibitions ===
The library's exhibit spaces include the North Gallery, which, among other things, showcases two stories of glass-enclosed book stacks and a permanent exhibit featuring a snapshot of Spencer's distinctive collections. Spencer also hosts rotating exhibits throughout the year.

== Footnotes ==
=== Bibliography ===
- Crockett, Ken (2014). Kenneth & Helen Spencer of Kansas: Champions of Culture & Commerce in the Sunflower State. Mount Pleasant, SC: The History Press. ISBN 9781626193895.
- Helyar, James, ed. (1994). A Silver Anniversary: The First 25 Years of the Kenneth Spencer Research Library. Lawrence, KS: University of Kansas.
- Mason, Alexandra (1994). "Introduction". In Helyar, James (ed.). A Silver Anniversary: The First 25 Years of the Kenneth Spencer Research Library. Lawrence, KS: University of Kansas. pp. 9–10.
