= Georg von Dehn-Schmidt =

German diplomat (1876–1937)

- Born: 9 February 1876; Guhrau, Silesia, German Empire
- Died: 14 July 1937 (aged 61); Munich, Bavaria, Nazi Germany
- Occupation: Diplomat
- Years active: 1908-1936

Georg von Dehn-Schmidt (9 February 1876-14 July 1937) was a German diplomat. He served the German Empire, Weimar Republic and Nazi Germany. He served as Germany's envoy for the Irish Free State and ambassador to Romania. He was fired from the German diplomatic service in 1936 after being photographed kissing the ring of the Papal Nuncio.

== Career ==
von Dehn-Schmidt was born in Guhrau, Province of Silesia on 9 February 1876. He joined the Auswärtiges Amt in 1908, working in the Netherlands. During the First World War, he was conscripted as a lieutenant in the Imperial German Army and seconded to assist Governor-General Moritz von Bissing in German occupied Belgium before returning to Berlin in 1917 to work in the intelligence department of the German Foreign Service.

In 1924, Von Dehn-Schmidt was appointed as Germany's first Consul-General to the Irish Free State. Prior to 1929, he carried out his duties based in Liverpool, United Kingdom. In 1928, he blocked a request from the Irish Department of Defence for 5,000 German army helmets claiming it would breach trading regulations but the helmets were later purchased from the British company Vickers in order to bypass von Dehn-Schmidt. In 1934, he applied for membership to the Nazi Party but this was vetoed by the Irish branch of the Nazi Party/Foreign Organization headed by Adolf Mahr.

In 1934, he was appointed as Germany's ambassador to Romania. Shortly before leaving Ireland, he made a number of courtesy farewell visits to other diplomatic delegations in Phoenix Park, Dublin. When he met the Papal Nuncio Paschal Robinson, he bowed and kissed Robinson's episcopal ring. This was photographed by a press photographer. Mahr obtained a copy of the photo and forwarded it onto Julius Streicher for him to publish in Der Stürmer, knowing that Adolf Hitler would read about it. Hitler then recalled von Dehn-Schmidt from his posting in Bucharest and fired him from the diplomatic service claiming that he had acted in a manner unbecoming a German representative. Mahr would subsequently deny any involvement in von Dehn-Schmidt's dismissal.

von Dehn Schmidt died on 14 July 1937 in Munich, Bavaria.
