= Rudolf Hoppe =

German chemist (1922–2014)

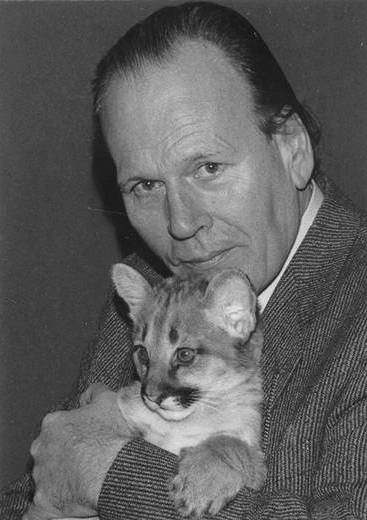
- Rudolf Hoppe (1990)
- Born: 29 October 1922; Wittenberge, Germany
- Died: 24 November 2014 (aged 92); Giessen, Hesse, Germany
- Education: University of Kiel
- Known for: Pioneering work on noble gas compounds such as Xenon difluoride
- Scientific career
- Fields: Chemist
- Workplaces: University of Münster; University of Giessen
- Doctoral advisor: Wilhelm Klemm
- Doctoral students: Hans Georg von Schnering

Rudolf Hoppe (29 October 1922 – 24 November 2014), a German chemist, discovered the first covalent noble gas compounds.

== Academic career ==
Hoppe studied chemistry at the Christian-Albrechts-University of Kiel and was awarded his doctorate at the Westfälische Wilhelms-University of Münster in 1954 under the supervision of Wilhelm Klemm. He also got his habilitation degree in Münster and gained a professorship for inorganic chemistry in 1958. In 1965, Hoppe accepted an offer for the chair of inorganic and analytic chemistry at the Justus Liebig University Giessen, which he kept until his retirement in 1991.

== Scientific research ==
=== In Münster ===
Hoppe became famous through his synthesis of the stable noble gas compound XeF_{2} (xenon difluoride), reported in November 1962. His work followed the previous synthesis of by xenon hexafluoroplatinate by Neil Bartlett, in an experiment run on March 23, 1962 and reported in June of that year. Until then, everyone had assumed that compounds of such kind would not exist, the reason being, first, unsuccessful experiments attempting to synthesize such noble gas compounds and, second, the concept of the "closed octet of electrons", according to which noble gases would not participate in chemical reactions.

Through the properties of the interhalogen compounds it had become obvious that noble gas fluorides were the only accessible ones. Since 1949/50, a research group in Münster had carried out in-depth discussions on the possibility of the formation and the properties of xenon fluorides. This research group was convinced, already in 1951, that XeF_{4} and XeF_{2} should be thermodynamically stable against the decomposition into the elements.

For a long time it was planned to occasionally perform synthetic experiments targeted at the xenon fluorides. Technical and conceptional difficulties, however, interfered in Münster. On the one hand, xenon was not accessible in sufficient purity; on the other hand, the researchers believed that only pressure syntheses would be successful, for which steel bottles with compressed F_{2} were needed. Since 1961, those F_{2}-pressure cylinders had been promised by American friends but the transfer could not take place until 1963 because the valves of non-standard U.S. pressure cylinders were not allowed in Germany and vice versa.

Nevertheless, Hoppe’s research group was able to generate XeF_{2} in the form of transparent crystals in early 1962. To do so, they let electric sparks impact on xenon-fluorine mixtures. Neil Bartlett tried a similar experiment for the first time in the USA on August 2, 1962. After a few days, he gained xenon tetrafluoride, XeF_{4}.

=== In Gießen ===
In Gießen, Hoppe continued his extensive research in the field of solid state chemistry with a focus on the synthesis and characterization of oxo- and fluorometalates of the alkali metals. During his research he published over 650 articles in international and national peer-review journals. In addition, he had been the scientific editor for the German Journal of Inorganic and General Chemistry (Zeitschrift für Anorganische und Allgemeine Chemie).

== Teachings ==
As a professor, Prof. Hoppe taught many young students the fundamentals of chemistry and other more specific topics. In addition, 114 doctoral candidates earned their Ph.D. with Hoppe as their supervisor.

== Other activities ==
Hoppe was a great pet lover and was known to be a supporter of zoological gardens. He died at the age of 92 on 24 November 2014.

== Honors ==
- Honorary doctorate of the Christian Albrechts University of Kiel (1983) as well as of the University of Ljubljana (1990)
- Award of the Göttingen Academy of Sciences and Humanities (1963)
- Alfred Stock Award of the German Chemical Society (1974)
- Henri Moissan Medal of the Société chimique de France (1986)
- Jozef Stefan Medal of the Jozef Stefan Institute in Ljubljana (1988)
- Otto Hahn Award for Chemistry and Physics (1989) as the first representative of inorganic chemistry
- Lavoisier Medal (along with Derek Barton) of the Société chimique de France (1995)

Furthermore, Hoppe has been a member of several scientific societies and academies as well as of the German National Academy of Sciences Leopoldina in Halle and of the Bavarian Academy of Sciences and Austrian Academy of Sciences.
