= Zeitschrift für anorganische und allgemeine Chemie =

- Discipline: Chemistry
- Language: English
- Edited by: Thomas F. Fässler, Guodong Qian, Christian Limberg, David Scheschkewitz

Publication details
- Former name: Zeitschrift für Anorganische Chemie
- History: 1892-present
- Publisher: Wiley-VCH
- Frequency: 24/year
- Impact factor: 1.4 (2022)

Standard abbreviations
- ISO 4: Z. Anorg. Allg. Chem.

Indexing
- CODEN: ZAACAB
- ISSN: 0044-2313 (print); 1521-3749 (web)
- LCCN: 20004586
- OCLC no.: 1770423

Links
- Journal homepage; Online access; Online archive

The Zeitschrift für anorganische und allgemeine Chemie (Journal of Inorganic and General Chemistry) is a semimonthly peer-reviewed scientific journal covering inorganic chemistry, published by Wiley-VCH. The editors-in-chief are Thomas F. Fässler, Christian Limberg, Guodong Qian, and David Scheschkewitz. Originally the journal was published in German, but nowadays it is completely in English.

== Abstracting and indexing ==
The journal is abstracted and indexed in:

- Cambridge Structural Database
- Chemical Abstracts Service
- ChemInform
- Current Contents/Physical, Chemical & Earth Sciences
- Inspec
- Science Citation Index Expanded
- Scopus

According to the Journal Citation Reports, the journal has a 2022 impact factor of 1.4.

== History ==
In 1892, Gerhard Krüss (LMU Munich), established the journal under the name Zeitschrift für Anorganische Chemie. Krüss died three years later, and was succeeded by Richard Lorenz and Walther Nernst. In 1907, the journal obtained its current name.
