= Wilhelm Biltz =

German chemist (1877–1943)

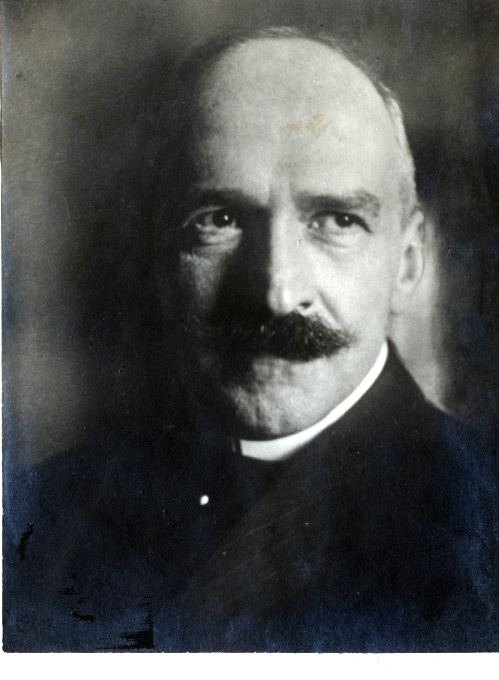
- Wilhelm Biltz
- Born: 8 March 1877; Berlin, German Empire
- Died: 13 November 1943 (aged 66); Heidelberg, Germany
- Education: University of Greifswald
- Known for: Colloid-Chemistry; Thermal analysis of non-metallic systems
- Scientific career
- Workplaces: University of Göttingen, Clausthal University of Technology, Leibniz University Hannover,
- Doctoral advisor: Friedrich Wilhelm Semmler,

Wilhelm Biltz (8 March 1877 – 13 November 1943) was a German chemist and scientific editor.

In addition to his scholarly work, Biltz is noted for commanding the principal German tank involved in the first ever tank-on-tank battle in history at the Second Battle of Villers-Bretonneux.

== Life and career ==
Wilhelm Biltz was the son of Karl Friedrich Biltz who was a literary scholar and theatre critic. His older brother, Heinrich Biltz, was also a noted chemist.

=== Education ===
After his university entrance diploma at the Royal Grammar School (Königliches Wilhelm-Gymnasium) in Berlin in 1895 and influenced by his elder brother Heinrich, Wilhelm Biltz began studying chemistry in the Humboldt University of Berlin, the University of Heidelberg and continued his studies in 1898 with professor Friedrich Wilhelm Semmler in the University of Greifswald where he was awarded his doctorate in natural science with research on the chemistry of Terpenes.

=== Academic career ===
From 1900 Wilhelm Biltz worked as an assistant and from 1903 as an associate professor with Otto Wallach at the University of Göttingen. There he concentrated his work firstly on the determination of vapour density in solutions of inorganic compounds and later he was engaged in researches into the chemistry of colloids. He gained further scientific and practical experiences in the university research institute of Clemens Winkler in analytical and inorganic chemistry and later in Metallurgy in Göttingen with Gustav Tamman. During these years he also investigated the influence of temperature on the properties of non-metallic systems as for example Polysulfides of Rubidium and Caesium by the use of thermal analysis.

At the age of 28, on March 15, 1905, he succeeded on being promoted to professor at the Clausthal University of Technology where he lectured until 1921.

=== World War I ===
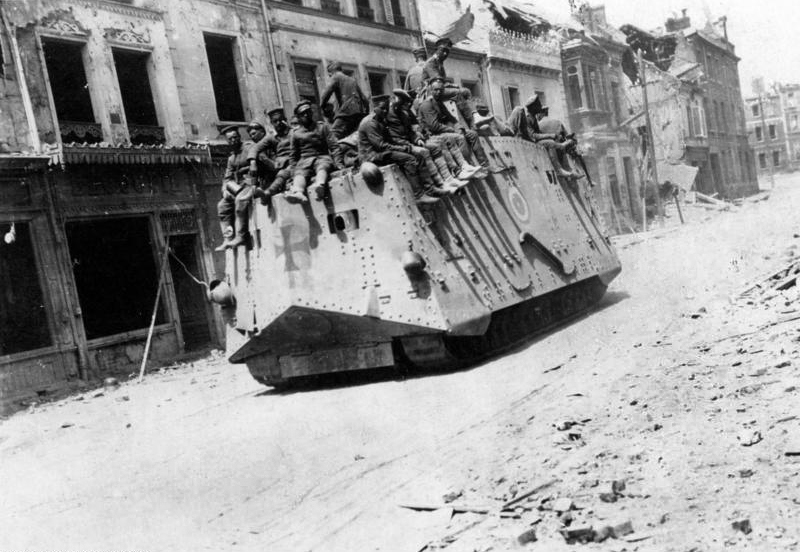
An A7V tank at Roye, Somme, 21 March 1918

His work was interrupted when he participated in World War I. He held the rank of Second lieutenant throughout the war and was honoured with the Iron Cross first class.

His military service is notable for his command of the German A7V tank that took part in history's first tank-versus-tank battle, during the Second Battle of Villers-Bretonneux in April 1918. During the battle his tank encountered a group of three British Mark IV tanks – two "female tanks", armed only with machine guns and a single "male tank", armed with 6-pound guns.

Both the British female tanks were damaged and retreated, as their machine guns had no effect on Blitz's A7V. In a running battle that followed, both tanks manoeuvred to avoid the other's fire while lining up on their opponent. Biltz's tank lost the duel – it was hit three times by the British tank and heeled over on its side. The crew abandoned their A7V but five were killed by continued fire from the Mark IV, which went on to engage two more A7V tanks that had appeared on the scene.

Despite attempts by Biltz to recover the tank, damage to the engine forced demolition crews to blow it up on the night of 23–24 April.

=== Post war ===
After the war, Biltz continued his academic career. He was appointed as professor and director of the inorganic-chemical institute of the Technical University of Hannover on 22 March 1921. Here he had his most successful years and he supported young chemistry talent such as Wilhelm Klemm and Werner Fischer.

During his activities as a long-time member of the Göttingen Academy of Sciences, as member of the German Academy of Sciences Leopoldina of Halle and as constant member of the board of the German Bunsen Society he applied his energies for the further development of sciences and research.

In 1933 Blitz signed the Loyalty Oath of German Professors to Adolf Hitler and the National Socialist State.

In addition to the above memberships he acquired renown as an author of textbooks and some of them he wrote together with his brother Heinrich Biltz. Furthermore, he was an academic author of the ‘journal for inorganic and general chemistry’ for many years until his early retirement due to impaired health.

He never married and remained childless.

== Publications and books (options) ==
- Wilhelm Biltz and Heinrich Biltz;: ’’Übungsbeispiele aus der unorganischen Experimentalchemie’’. 1. Aufl. 1907; 3.und 4. Aufl. 1920, Engelmann, Leipzig
- Wilhelm Biltz: ’’Ausführung qualitativer Analysen’’. 4. Aufl. 1930, Akademische Verlagsgesellschaft, Leipzig
- Wilhelm Biltz: ’’Raumchemie der festen Stoffe’’. L. Voss, Leipzig, 1934. Bd. X, 338 S.
- Wilhelm Biltz works in Wiley Interscience:
- Willhelm Biltz works in Library of Congress:
- Wilhelm Biltz works in the catalogue of the German National Library:

== Certificate of honours ==
- 22. Juni 1927 honorary doctor of the University of Stuttgart
- 3. October 1929 honorary professor of the University of Göttingen
- 7. Mai 1932 honorary doctor of the Czech Technical University in Prague
- 1934 honorary citizen of Heidelberg

== Additional sources ==
- Archive documents Hans-Thorald Michaelis (Nephew)
- Hans-Thorald Michaelis: ’’Die Gebrüder Heinrich und Wilhelm Biltz und ihre Vorfahren’’ (’’The brothers Heinrich and Wilhelm Biltz and their ancestors’’); Mitteldeutsche Familienkunde Band VI, Jg. 21, Heft 3, S. 231-303, 1980
- Nachruf R. Juza, in: ’’Zeitschrift für Elektrochemie und angewandte physikalische Chemie’’, Band 50, Nr. 1, S. 1-2, 1944
- Nachruf G. F. Hüttig, in: ’’Kolloid-Zeitschrift’’, Sonderdruck, Band 106, Heft 3, Theodor-Steinkopf-Verlag, Dresden und Leipzig, 1944
