= Gerritsen Collection =

Women's archival materials and feminist records collection

The Gerritsen Collection (also known as the Gerritsen Collection of Aletta H. Jacobs or the Gerritsen Collection of Women's History) is a diverse collection of women's archival materials and feminist records covering fifteen languages and over 4,700 volumes. Acquired by the John Crerar Library of Chicago in 1903, it was subsequently sold to the University of Kansas in 1954. In the 21st century, the holdings were digitized and are now widely available through subscription to libraries worldwide.

== History ==
In 1903, Aletta Jacobs, one of the first women physicians in the Netherlands and an active international suffragist, sold her collection of feminist books, magazines, and pamphlets to the John Crerar Library of Chicago. At the time she sold the records, she was ending her medical practice to devote herself to the suffrage cause. The collection bears her husband, Carel Victor Gerritsen's surname, in spite of the fact that Jacobs and Gerritsen had a premarital agreement that she would retain her own surname. She had compiled around 2,000 volumes of materials mostly focused on Dutch, French and German works, with a few early works about women in English. The works spanned the period from the 16th to the 20th century, with the majority of the materials focused on the nineteenth century.

For over three decades the materials were left to languish, unavailable to scholars and still boxed. With the creation of the National Archives and Records Administration in 1934, preservation efforts increased throughout the United States and a push was started to collect unpublished source materials. The Crerar Library began adding English titles to the collection, doubling its size, and in 1954, sold it to the University of Kansas, in Lawrence. Housed in the Kenneth Spencer Research Library, curators continued adding titles to the collection through 1975. In the 1970s several publishing houses, such as Arno Press, Garland Publishers, and Source Book Press, reprinted some of the feminist works in the collection which were written in English.

Microfilming of the collection began in 1974, as a way to both preserve the records and share them with other archives and libraries. It took over three years to complete filming. In the 21st century, ProQuest digitized the Gerritsen Collection, in two segments. One includes the nearly 4,000 books called the Monograph Language Series and the other section comprises around 700 periodicals and pamphlets and is referred to as the Periodical Series. The digitized product is available to subscribers.

== Collections ==
One of the earliest volumes in the collection is Lodovico Dolce's Dialogo della institution delle donne (Dialogue of Women's Institutions, 1547) and translations dating to 1566 and 1726 of Agrippa von Nettesheim's arguments in favor of "the nobility and excellence of the female sex". A large portion of the collection covers the 19th century suffrage and women's rights movements, containing material on most of the pioneers of the German movement; scholarly articles analyzing socio-economic and political rights of women, as well as topics which affected women such as the family and prostitution; and popular articles on women's rights. There were also works by and about activists like Helen Blackburn (UK), Emily Davies (UK), Charlotte Perkins Gilman (US), Ellen Key (Sweden), and Mary Wollstonecraft (UK), among many others. Periodicals dating from 1832, besides German and English titles, focus on both suffrage and anti-suffrage works from Arab countries, Australia, Austria, Canada, Czechoslovakia, Denmark, France, Greece, Hungary, The Netherlands, New Zealand, Norway, and Switzerland.

There are volumes in the collection dating to the 17th century, which focus on women's legal status. Some evaluate particular legal problems, while others evaluate historical periods, or country-specific legal systems. A significant portion of the legal documents evaluate prostitution in countries like Algeria, Cuba, France, Germany, Great Britain, Italy, Japan, Mexico, the Netherlands, South Africa, and the United States. About 20% of the volumes dealing with legal status were written by women. Other parts of the collection focus on women's education and employment. These include historical surveys, research papers, and reports, and material both by and about women. The documents are largely about women in Germany, Great Britain, France, Italy, the Netherlands and the United States. Many of the works on employment focus on job training, how-to guides for employment, unionization, as well as women's employment in a variety of occupations.

In addition to works on anthropological and sociological examinations of marital and sexual relationships, dating to the 18th century, there were books on women's roles in religion, and a large section of both autobiographical and biographical works about women, mostly in Dutch, English, French, and German, though the entire collection includes works in fifteen languages.
