= Heinrich Biltz =

German chemist (1865–1943)

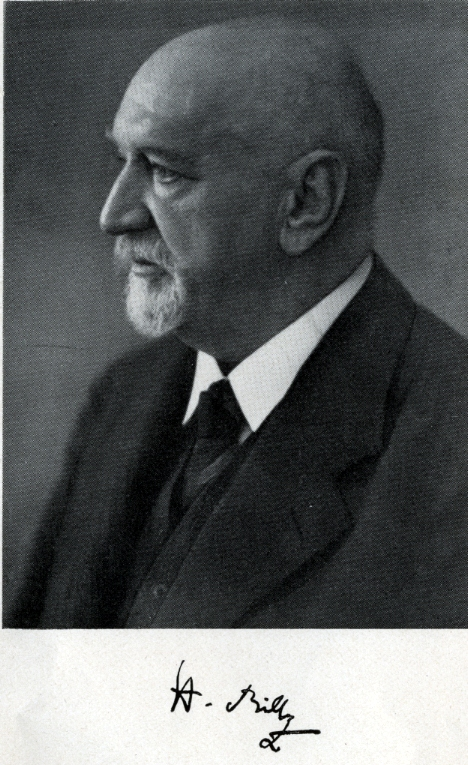
- Heinrich Biltz
- Born: 26 May 1865; Berlin, Prussia (now Germany)
- Died: 29 October 1943 (aged 78); Breslau, Germany (now Poland)
- Education: University of Göttingen
- Known for: Synthesis of Phenytoin; reactions of Acetylene and Autoxidation; Oxidative degradation of Uric Acid
- Scientific career
- Workplaces: University of Greifswald, University of Kiel, University of Breslau,
- Doctoral advisor: Victor Meyer,

Heinrich Biltz (26 May 1865 – 29 October 1943) was a German chemist and professor.

== Life and career ==
Heinrich Biltz was the son of Karl Friedrich Biltz who was a literary scholar and theatre critic His brother Wilhelm Biltz was also a noted chemist.

After his university entrance diploma at the Royal Grammar School (Königliches Wilhelm-Gymnasium) in Berlin in 1885 Heinrich began studying chemistry in the Humboldt University of Berlin with August Wilhelm von Hofmann. later studying at the University of Göttingen with Victor Meyer. In 1888 he was awarded his doctorate in natural science with the continuation of research commenced by Victor Meyer on the molecular weight of substances at high temperatures. During this time he also determined the vapour density from Tin (II) chloride and Sulphur.

From 8 July 1891 to 1897, Heinrich was a professor of chemistry at the University of Greifswald. In 1897 he became a professor of the Department of Inorganic Chemistry at the University of Kiel where he continued his research on the determination of vapour density. In 1908 he succeeded in the synthesis of Phenytoin, which was used 30 years later as an effective drug for the control of seizure disorders.

From autumn 1911 until his retirement in 1933, Heinrich lectured at the newly formed Albert Ladenburg Institute of the University of Breslau (Wroclaw) with his main emphasis on chemical reactions of organic substances, especially the reactions of Acetylene and Autoxidation. He concentrated his further research activities on the chemistry of Uric Acid. He achieved and proved the complete oxidative degradation of Uric Acid with several oxidising agents.

Heinrich's work was interrupted when he participated in World War I as a reserve officer. After the war he increased his research activities considerably, often in close co-operation with his younger brother Wilhelm Biltz who was also professor of chemistry and with other highly renowned chemists.

The German Chemical Industry established in 1925 the Heinrich Biltz Foundation which was destined to support highly skilled students. In honour of the merits of Heinrich Biltz, Walter Hückel issued an obituary in the journal Chemische Berichte and annexed a complete bibliography of his work.

He married Freya de la Motte Fouqué, a daughter of a physician in Kiel, but they had no children.

== Publications and books (options) ==
- Biltz, Heinrich: ‚"Experimentelle Einführung in die Unorganische Chemie". Veit & Comp, Leipzig, later Walter de Gruyter. - Berlin [u. a.] 1. Aufl. 1898, 20. Auflage 1938, later continued by Wilhelm Klemm u. Werner Fischer
- Biltz, Heinrich: "Qualitative Analyse unorganischer Substanzen", 1. Auflage 1900, 13 und 14. Auflage 1936; Veit & Comp, Leipzig, later Walter de Gruyter
- Biltz, Heinrich; Biltz, Wilhelm: "Übungsbeispiele aus der unorganischen Experimentalchemie", 1. Auflage 1907; 3.und 4. Auflage 1920; Engelmann, Leipzig
- Heinrich Biltz works in Wiley Interscience:
- Biltz, Heinrich works in Library of Congress:
- Publications of and about Heinrich Biltz in the catalogue of the German National Library:
