= TER Nord-Pas-de-Calais =

French regional rail network

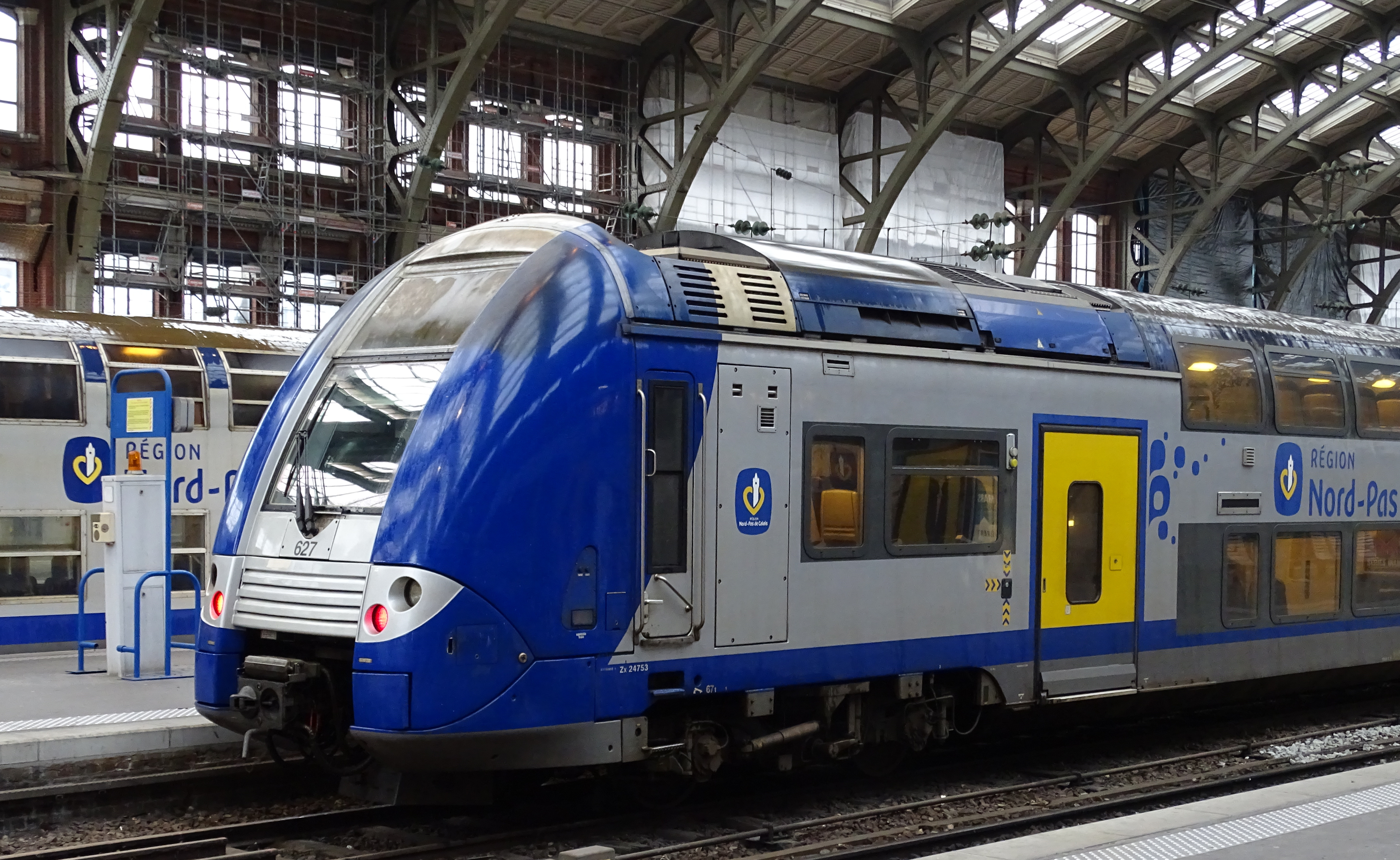

Overview
- Website: http://www.sncf.com/en/trains/ter

Technical
- Track gauge: 1,435 mm (4 ft 8 1/2 in) standard gauge
System map
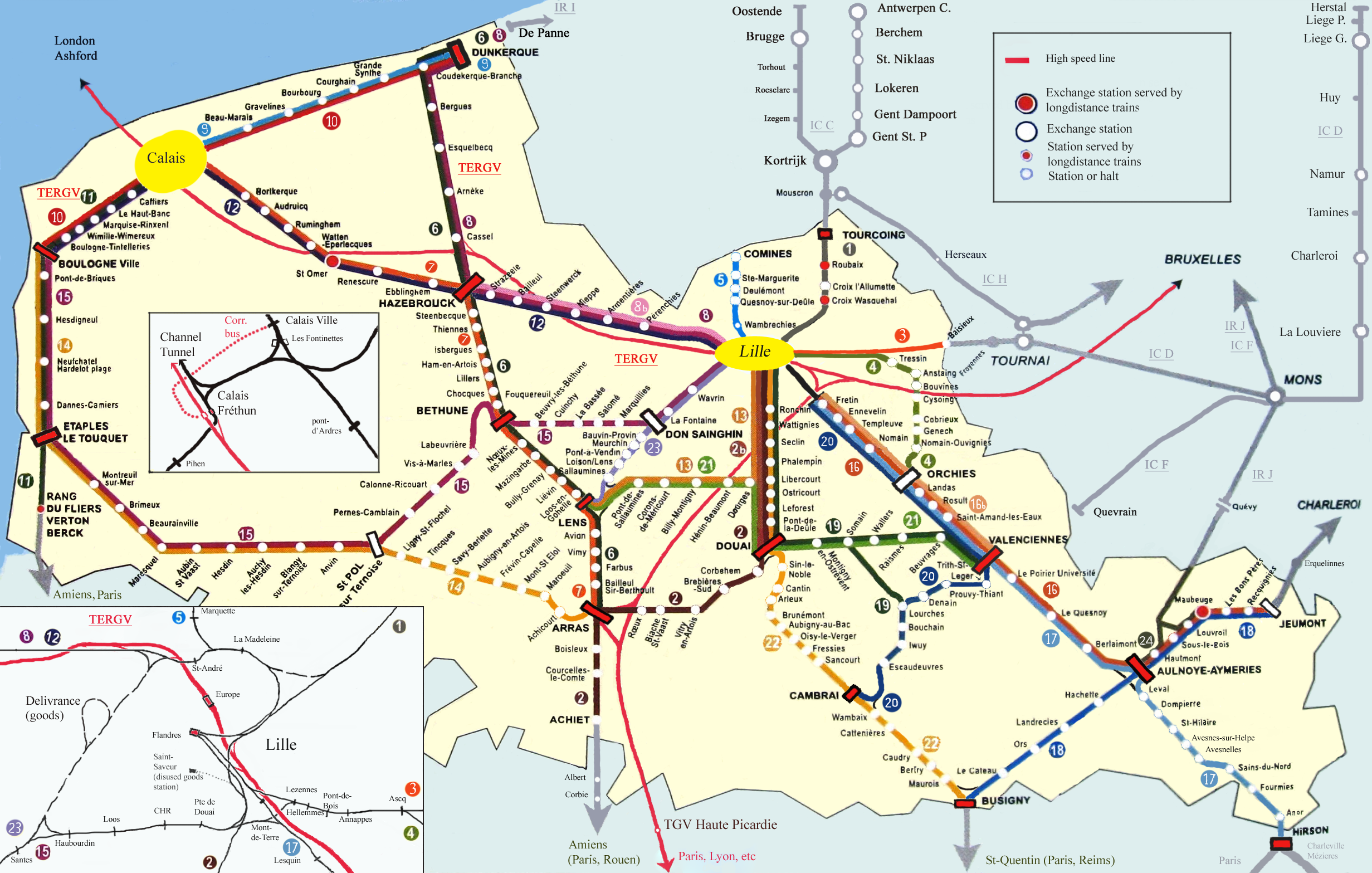

TER Nord-Pas-de-Calais was the regional rail network serving Nord-Pas-de-Calais région, France. In 2017 it was merged into the new TER Hauts-de-France.

== Network ==
Line	Route	Frequency	Notes
1	Lille-Flandres ... Roubaix – Tourcoing ... Kortrijk ... Antwerp / Oostende		
2	Amiens ... Arras ... Douai ... Lille-Flandres (see TER Picardie line 1 for details)		
3	Lille-Flandres ... Ascq† ... Tournai ... Charleroi-South ... Liège-Guillemins		
4	Lille-Flandres ... Ascq ... Orchies		
5	Lille-Flandres ... Comines (France)		
6	Dunkerque – Bergues – Hazebrouck ... Béthune ... Lens ... Arras		
7	Calais-Ville – Saint-Omer – Hazebrouck ... Béthune ... Lens ... Arras		
8	Dunkerque ... Hazebrouck ... Armentières ... Lille-Flandres		
9	Calais-Ville ... Dunkerque		
11	Amiens ... Abbeville ... Étaples-Le Touquet ... Boulogne-Ville ... Calais-Ville (see TER Picardie line 24 for details)		
12	Boulogne-Ville ... Calais-Ville ... Hazebrouck ... Armentières ... Lille-Flandres		
13	Lille-Flandres ... Libercourt ... Lens		
14	Boulogne-Ville ... Étaples-Le Touquet ... Saint-Pol-sur-Ternoise ... Arras		
15	Boulogne-Ville ... Étaples-Le Touquet ... Saint-Pol-sur-Ternoise ... Béthune ... Don-Sainghin ... Lille-Flandres		
16	Lille-Flandres ... Orchies ... Valenciennes ... Aulnoye-Aymeries ... Maubeuge ... Jeumont		
17	Lille-Flandres ... Valenciennes ... Aulnoye-Aymeries† ... Avesnes-sur-Helpe ... Hirson ... Charleville-Mézières		
18	Busigny ... Aulnoye-Aymeries		
19	Lille-Flandres ... Somain ... Valenciennes branch line: Somain – Lourches		
20	Lille-Flandres – Valenciennes ... Lourches ... Cambrai		
21	Lens ... Douai ... Valenciennes		
22	Lille-Flandres – Douai ... Cambrai ... Busigny – Saint-Quentin		
23	Lens ... Don-Sainghin ... Lille-Flandres		
24	Jeumont – Erquelinnes ... Thuin ... Charleroi-South		
† Not all trains call at this station

- Lille – Calais – Boulogne-sur-Mer (TER grande vitesse)
- Lille – Dunkerque (TER grande vitesse)
- Lille – Arras (TER grande vitesse)

== Rolling stock ==
=== Multiple units ===
- SNCF Class Z 23500
- SNCF Class Z 24500
- SNCF Class Z 92050
- SNCF Class X 4500
- SNCF Class X 73500
- Autorail grande capacité:
  - SNCF Class B 82500
  - SNCF Class X 76500 also called XGC
- SNCF Class Z 26500

=== Locomotives ===
- SNCF Class BB 16500
- SNCF Class BB 66400
- SNCF Class BB 67400

== Schemes ==
=== TER grande vitesse ===
With the objective of connecting all the towns on the Northwest coast to Lille in less than an hour, the Nord-Pas de Calais région has put in place TERGV. Certain trains, with the agreement of the SNCF, use the LGV Nord from Lille-Europe to reach their destination instead of conventional lines. This enables them to connect Lille to Calais, Boulogne-sur-Mer, Dunkirk and Arras in less than an hour.

=== Electrification Completed ===
The railway is electrified from Calais-Ville via Gravelines to Dunkerque.

=== Future projects ===
The region envisages to:

- double and electrify the line between Calais and Dunkirk
- build two new lines between Arras and Cambrai and between Douai and Orchies
- reopen the line between Béthune and Bruay-la-Buissière
- increase frequency of service between Lille and Lens
- create a new high speed regional service between Fourmies, Maubeuge and Lille, to reduce travel time from an hour and thirty minutes to forty-five minutes.
