= Béthune station =

Railway station in Béthune, France

Coordinates: 50°31′16″N 2°38′25″E

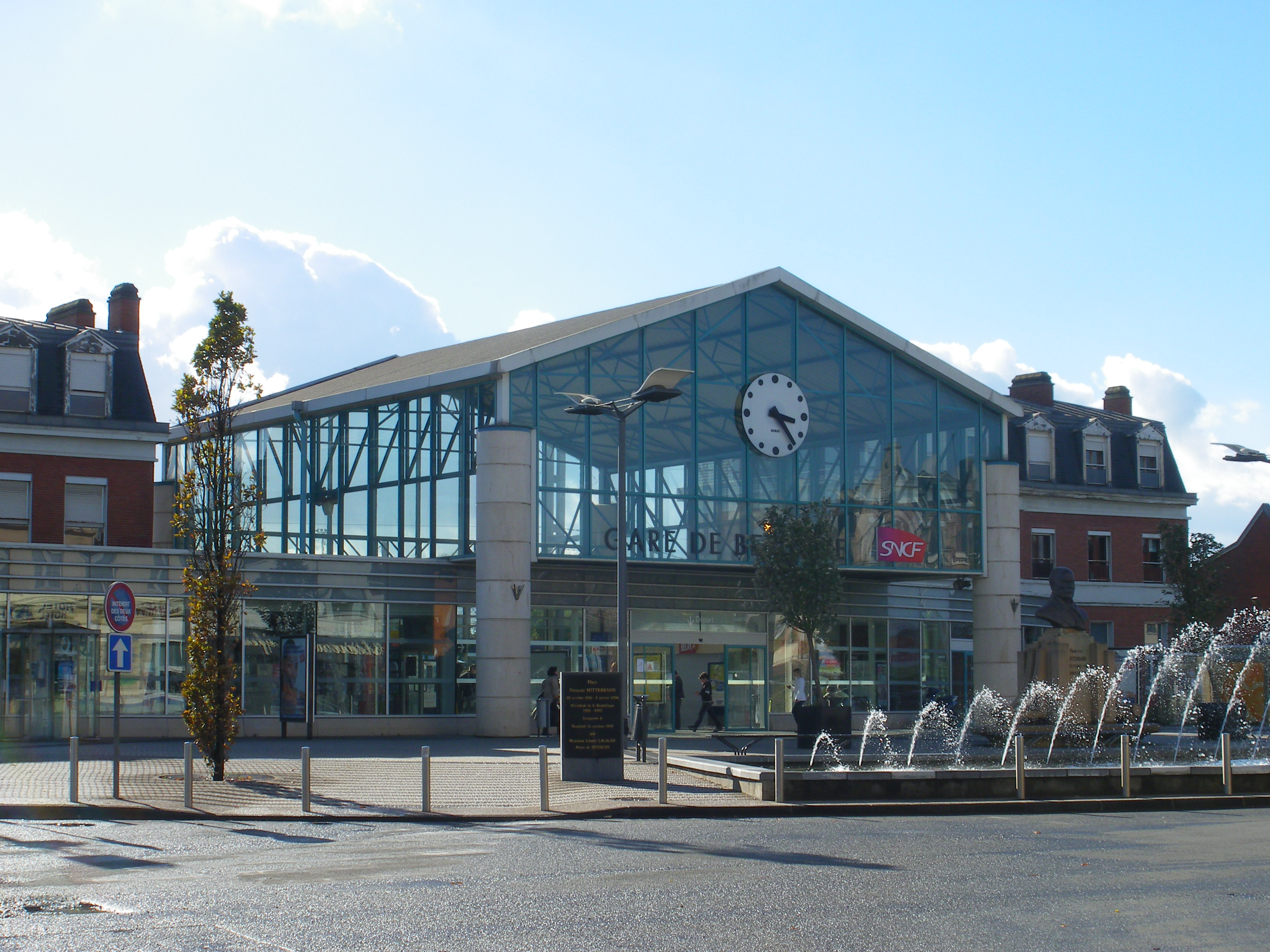
Main entrance

Béthune station is a railway station serving the town Béthune, Pas-de-Calais department, northern France. It is situated on the Arras–Dunkirk railway and the Fives–Abbeville railway. The station is served by high speed trains to Paris and Dunkerque, and by regional trains towards Lille, Arras, Saint-Pol-sur-Ternoise and Calais.

Preceding station	SNCF	Following station
Hazebrouck towards Dunkerque	TGV inOui	Lens towards Paris-Nord
Preceding station	TER Hauts-de-France	Following station
Vis-à-Marles towards Saint-Pol-sur-Ternoise	Krono K50	La Bassée-Violaines towards Lille-Flandres
Lillers towards Dunkerque	Krono K52	Nœux-les-Mines towards Arras
Terminus	Citi C50	Beuvry towards Lille-Flandres
Vis-à-Marles towards Saint-Pol-sur-Ternoise	Proxi P51	Terminus
Fouquereuil towards Hazebrouck	Proxi P52	Nœux-les-Mines towards Arras
Lillers towards Calais	Proxi P54	Nœux-les-Mines towards Arras
