= Lens station =

Railway station in Lens, France

Lens
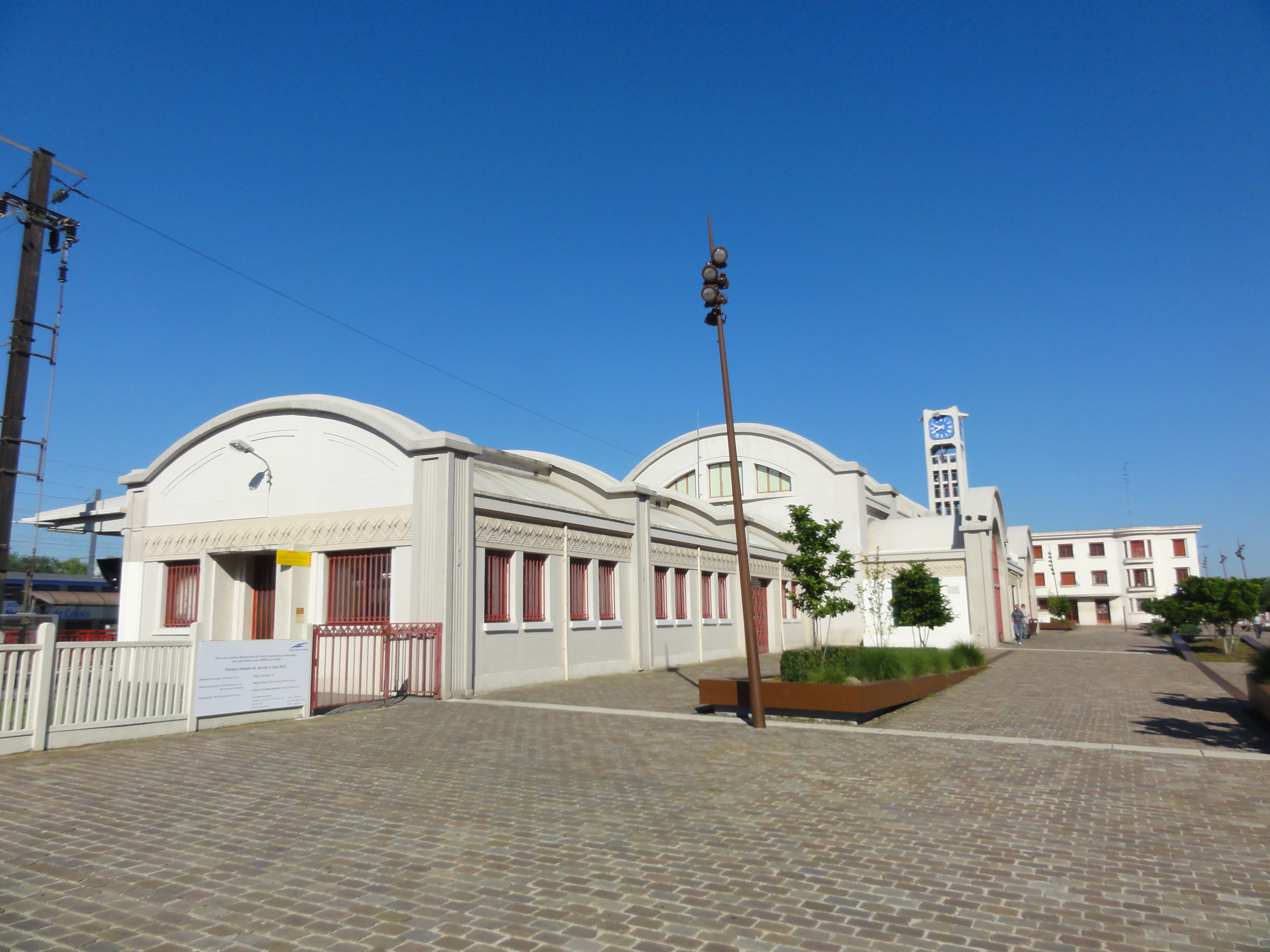
- The station building

General information
- Location: Place du général de Gaulle; 62300 Lens
- Coordinates: 50.426651°N 2.82786°E
- Owner: SNCF
- Operator: SNCF
- Lines: Arras–Dunkirk railway Lens–Don-Sainghin railway

Other information
- Station code: 87345025

History
- Opened: 1927
- Electrified: 25 kV 50 Hz

Passengers
- 2024: 1,769,301
Services
Preceding station	SNCF	Following station
Béthune towards Dunkerque	TGV inOui	Arras towards Paris-Nord
Preceding station	TER Hauts-de-France	Following station
Terminus	Krono K51	Pont-à-Vendin towards Lille-Flandres
Bully-Grenay towards Dunkerque	Krono K52	Avion towards Arras
Corons-de-Méricourt towards Lille-Flandres	Citi C41	Terminus
Terminus	Citi C51	Sallaumines towards Lille-Flandres
Pont-de-Sallaumines towards Douai	Proxi P42	Terminus
Loos-en-Gohelle towards Hazebrouck	Proxi P52	Avion towards Arras
Liévin towards Calais	Proxi P54	Avion towards Arras
Location

Lens station (French: Gare de Lens) is a railway station in Lens, Pas-de-Calais, France. The building was built in 1926–1927 to resemble a steam locomotive with a 23-metre-high (75 ft) tower as the chimney. The architect was Urbain Cassan. In December 1984 it was listed as a French National Heritage Site (Monument historique).

== Services ==
The station is served by high speed trains to Paris and regional trains to Lille, Douai, Arras, Béthune, Calais and Dunkerque.
