= Gare de Lille =

Gare de Lille may refer to one of several railway stations in the French city of Lille:

- Gare de Lille Europe, a city centre station served by TGV and Eurostar trains
- Gare de Lille Flandres, a city centre station served by other trains
