= Arras station =

French railway station

Arras
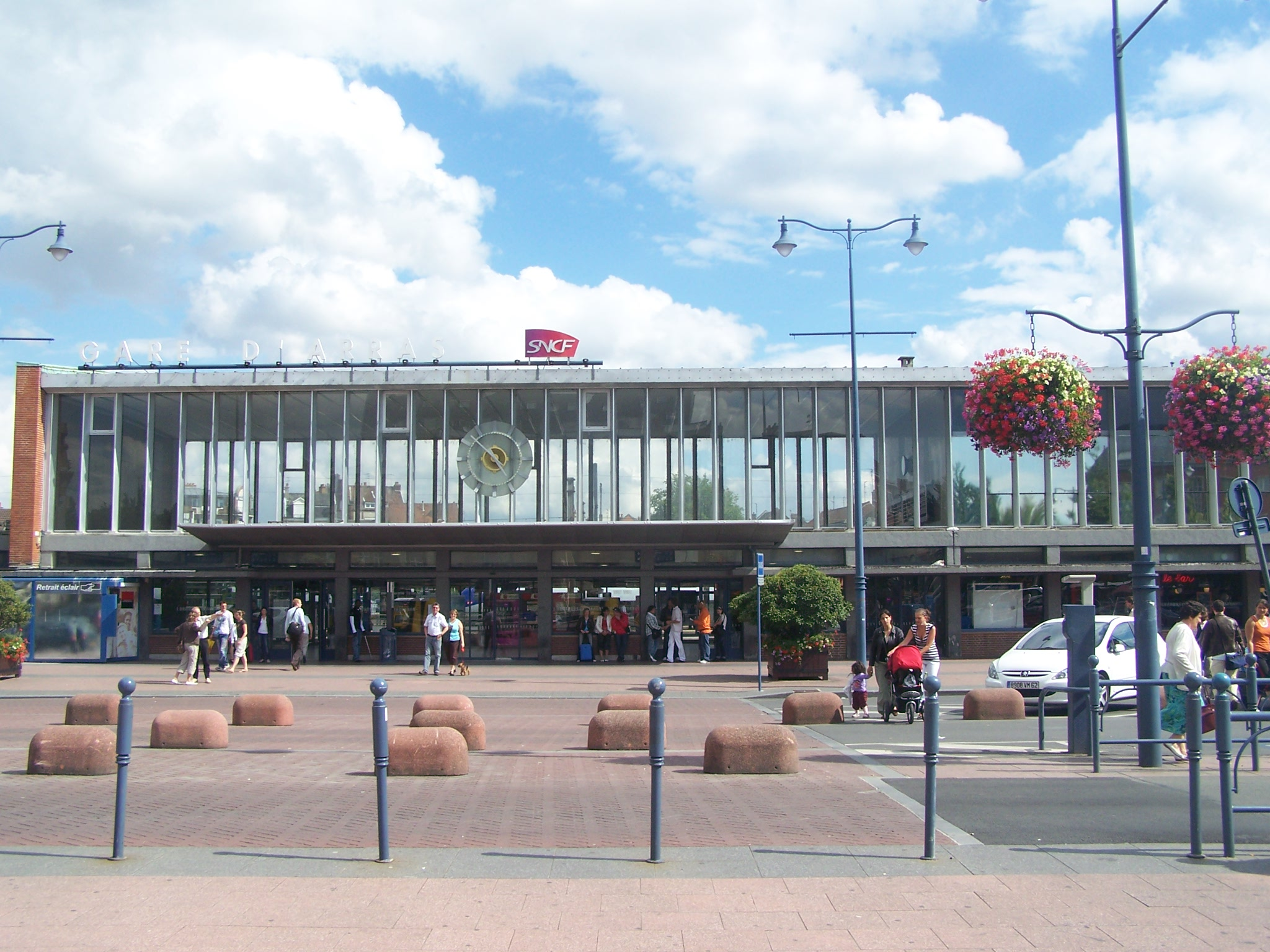

General information
- Location: Place du Maréchal Foch; 62000 Arras; Pas-de-Calais; France
- Coordinates: 50.2869°N 2.781391°E
- Owner: SNCF
- Operator: SNCF
- Lines: Paris-Lille railway Arras-Dunkirk railway (LGV Nord)
- Platforms: 5
- Tracks: 8 (+ 3 for service)

Other information
- Station code: 87342014

History
- Opened: 1 April 1846
- Electrified: 25 kV 50 Hz

Passengers
- 2024: 4,773,655

Services
TGV
TER Hauts-de-France
Location

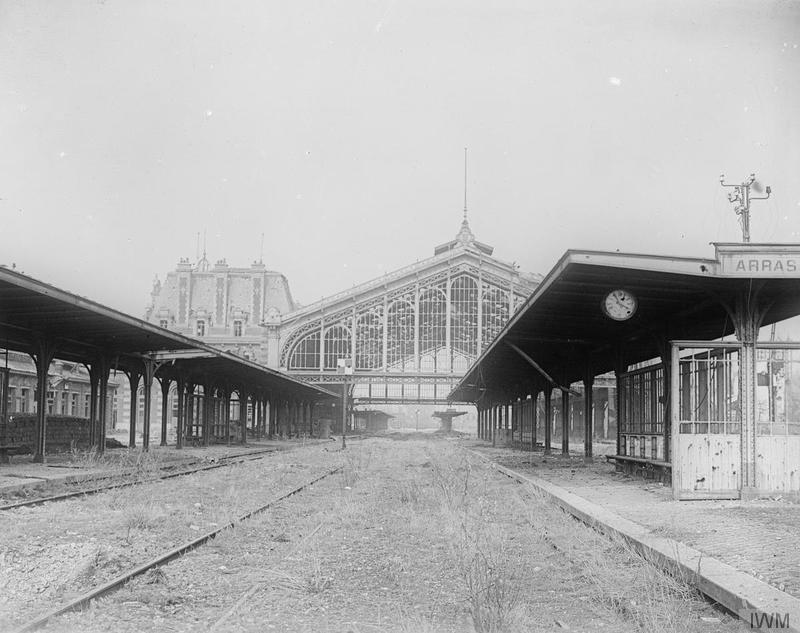
Arras' old railway station during World War I

Arras station (French: Gare d'Arras) is a railway station serving the town Arras, Pas-de-Calais department, northern France. This station, which opened in 1846, is located on the Paris–Lille railway and Arras-Dunkirk railway and accessible from LGV Nord. The train services are operated by SNCF.

== History ==
=== Planning ===
Initial discussions on plans for the Paris-Lille railway line did not plan on making Arras a principal station; and the competing project, a more easterly routing via Saint-Quentin and Cambrai, was initially favoured.

After a report by a municipal committee on 4 February 1834, however, the involvement of prominent figures from Arras helped to turn the situation around. The départmental council's (called a Conseil général at the time) railway committee and the Council's president, Germain Delebecque, supported Arras's bid from 1835 onwards. Maurice Colin, elected mayor of Arras in 1837 and also president of the chamber of commerce, lobbied strongly in favour of a route via Amiens and Arras, basing their arguments lower cost of the line passing through the flatter and shorter western Amiens and Arras route and the greater economic importance of the two towns compared to Saint-Quentin and Cambrai.

Their project eventually also found support in a report prepared by Cartier, an engineer, who, for military strategy reasons, recommended that the route pass as close as possible to the fortifications of Arras, so that the railway could be effectively defended against an enemy coming from the north, thus cutting off their easy access to Paris. As early as 1838, the route through Arras was included in the route from Paris to the Belgian border when the national railway known as the "Legrand star" was first presented. This took shape on the passage of the Trunk Railway Planning Act (loi relative à l'établissement des grandes lignes de chemin de fer en France) of 11 June 1842.

Arras station was opened on 1 April 1846 by the Compagnie des chemins de fer du Nord (Northern Railway Company) when it opened the section from Arras to the Belgian border of its line from Paris to Lille and the Belgian border. This first construction consisted of a temporary wooden building. The first permanent building was designed by Alfred Armand, the company's architect. When it opened in December 1847, the station comprised a modest single-storey building, a locomotive depot and a goods shed.

=== Evolution of station facilities ===
In 1865, following changes to traffic, the platform roofs of Lille's Fives station were dismantled and reassembled in Arras.

In 1880, various work was carried out, including an enlargement of the station and improvement of the water supply system. Most significantly, three electric semaphores for the implementation of the block system between the station and the Blangy junction were installed. In 1883, a building was constructed for traffic control, and a clock was installed on a turret.

In 1898, this second (1880) permanent passenger building by a third, larger building, inspired by the stations in Roubaix and Tourcoing, designed by Sidney Dunnett, the Nord railway's architect.

The 1898 passenger building was damaged in 1915 (during the First World War) and then destroyed in 1942 (during the Second World War) by bombing. A new building, the current one, was constructed in the 1950s.

=== Accidents and incidents ===
On 3 December 1947, sabotage led to the derailment of a mail train south of the station. This caused the deaths of around twenty people and left dozens injured.

The Thalys train on which a terrorist attack took place on 21 August 2015 was diverted to Arras station so that the immediate consequences of the incident could be dealt with.

== Train services ==
The station is served by the following services:

- High speed services (TGV) Valenciennes - Douai - Arras - Paris
- High speed services (TGV) Dunkerque - Hazebrouck - Arras - Paris
- High speed services (TGV) Lille - Arras - Paris
- High speed services (TGV) Lille - Aeroport CDG - Lyon - Avignon - Marseille
- High speed services (TGV) Lille - Aeroport CDG - Le Mans - Rennes / Angers - Nantes
- High speed services (TGV) Lille - Aeroport CDG - St-Pierre-des-Corps - Bordeaux
- Regional services (TER Hauts-de-France) Lille - Douai - Arras - Paris
- Regional services (TER Hauts-de-France) Arras - Lens - Bethune - Hazebrouck
- Local services (TER Hauts-de-France) Saint-Pol-sur-Ternoise - Arras

Preceding station	SNCF	Following station
Douai towards Valenciennes	TGV inOui	Paris-Nord Terminus
Lens towards Dunkerque	TGV inOui	Paris-Nord Terminus
Lille-Flandres towards Tourcoing	TGV inOui	Paris-Nord Terminus
Douai towards Lille-Flandres	TGV inOui	TGV Haute-Picardie towards Nantes, Lyon-Perrache or Marseille
Preceding station	TER Hauts-de-France	Following station
Amiens Terminus	Krono+ GV K90+	Lille-Europe towards Dunkerque
Amiens Terminus	Krono+ GV K92+	Lille-Europe towards Calais-Fréthun
Amiens Terminus	Krono+ GV K94+	Lille-Europe towards Rang-du-Fliers
Longueau towards Paris-Nord	Krono K12	Douai towards Lille-Flandres
Terminus	Krono K43	Douai towards Valenciennes
Douai towards Lille-Flandres	Krono K45	Albert towards Rouen-RD
Avion towards Dunkerque	Krono K52	Terminus
Boisleux towards Amiens	Proxi P22	Terminus
Rœux towards Douai	Proxi P44	Terminus
Bailleul-Sir-Berthoult towards Hazebrouck	Proxi P52	Terminus
Marœuil towards Étaples-Le Touquet	Proxi P53	Terminus
Vimy towards Calais	Proxi P54	Terminus
