= Douai station =

Railway station in France

Douai
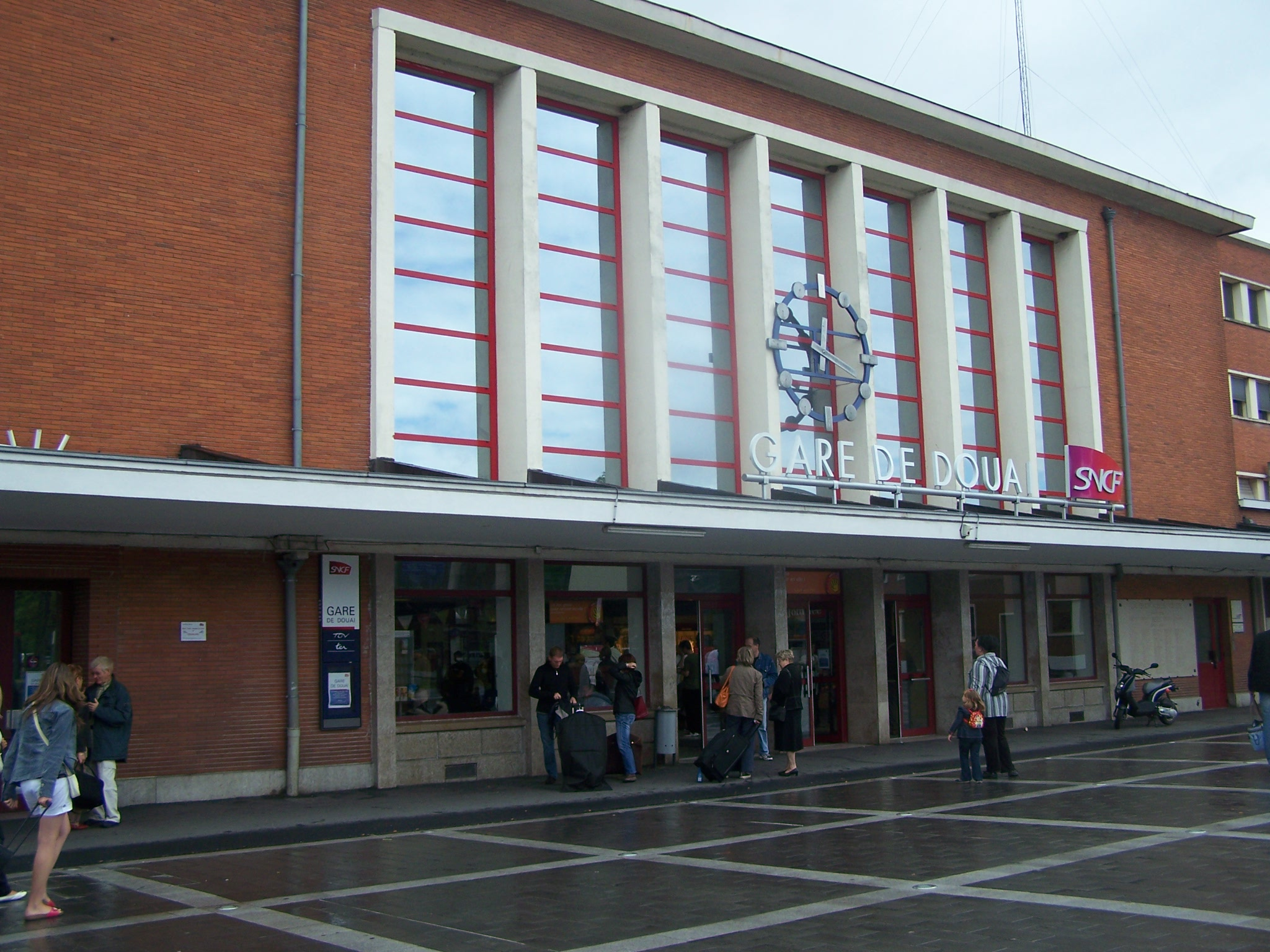
- Douai railway station

General information
- Location: Douai, Nord, Hauts-de-France, France
- Coordinates: 50°22′18″N 3°5′26″E
- Lines: Paris–Lille railway Douai–Valenciennes railway

Other information
- Station code: 87345009

Passengers
- 2024: 3,472,422
Services
Preceding station	SNCF	Following station
Arras towards Paris-Nord	TGV inOui	Lille-Europe towards Boulogne-Ville
Arras towards Paris-Nord	TGV inOui	Valenciennes Terminus
Lille-Flandres Terminus	TGV inOui	Arras towards Nantes, Lyon-Perrache or Marseille
Preceding station	TER Hauts-de-France	Following station
Arras towards Paris-Nord	Krono K12	Lille-Flandres Terminus
Lille-Flandres Terminus	Krono K40	Montigny-en-Ostrevent towards Saint-Quentin
Arras Terminus	Krono K43	Valenciennes Terminus
Lille-Flandres Terminus	Krono K45	Arras towards Rouen-RD
Pont-de-la-Deûle towards Lille-Flandres	Citi C40	Terminus
Terminus	Proxi P40	Sin-le-Noble towards Saint-Quentin
Terminus	Proxi P42	Ostricourt towards Lens
Terminus	Proxi P43	Montigny-en-Ostrevent towards Valenciennes
Terminus	Proxi P44	Corbehem towards Arras
Location

Douai is a railway station serving the town of Douai, Nord, France. The station opened in 1846 and is located on the Paris–Lille railway and Douai–Valenciennes railway. The train services are operated by SNCF.

== Train services ==
The station is served by the following services:

- High speed services (TGV) Valenciennes - Douai - Arras - Paris
- High speed services (TGV) Lille - Aeroport CDG - Lyon - Avignon - Marseille
- High speed services (TGV) Lille - Aeroport CDG - Le Mans - Rennes / Angers - Nantes
- High speed services (TGV) Lille - Aeroport CDG - St-Pierre-des-Corps - Bordeaux
- Regional services (TER Hauts-de-France) Lille - Douai - Arras - Paris
- Regional services (TER Hauts-de-France) Lille - Douai - Cambrai - St-Quentin
- Regional services (TER Hauts-de-France) Lille - Douai - Valenciennes
