= 1865 in rail transport =

This article lists events related to rail transport that occurred in 1865.

== Events ==
=== January events ===
- January 5 – The Festiniog Railway in North Wales officially opens to passengers, the first narrow gauge railway in the British Isles to do so.
- January 10 – The California Pacific Railroad absorbs the Sacramento and San Francisco Rail Road Company and the San Francisco and Marysville Rail Road Company.

=== February events ===
- February – The Confederate States of America authorize military control of railroads for the American Civil War.
- February 4 – The assets of Dayton, Xenia and Belpre Railroad in Ohio are sold in bankruptcy proceedings and split between the Little Miami Railroad and Columbus and Xenia Railroad.
- February 9 – The Colorado and Clear Creek Railroad, predecessor to the Colorado Central Railroad, is chartered.
- February 15 – The Chicago and North Western Railway and Galena and Chicago Union Railroad merge.

=== March events ===
- March – The Central Pacific Railroad hires agents to recruit thousands of Chinese workers from Guangdong Province.
- March 17 – The Jackson and Woodin Manufacturing Company shops in Berwick, Pennsylvania, are destroyed by fire.

=== April events ===
- April – The funeral train for Abraham Lincoln travels from Washington, D.C., to Illinois.

=== May events ===
- May – Opening of Talyllyn Railway in Wales.
- May 5 – The first train robbery in the United States takes place, in North Bend, Ohio (a suburb of Cincinnati), committed by armed guerillas from the American Civil War.
- May 25 – The first steel rails are rolled at a foundry in Chicago from Bessemer steel made in blast furnaces in Wyandotte, Michigan.

=== June events ===
- June 7 – The Rednal rail crash in England, a derailment at a permanent way work site, kills thirteen.
- June 9 – The Staplehurst rail crash in England, a derailment at a permanent way work site, kills ten and injures 49; Charles Dickens is amongst the survivors.
- July 31 – Opening of the narrow gauge (3 ft 6 in (1,067 mm)) main line from Ipswich to Grandchester, Queensland, Australia.

=== August events ===
- August 7 – The Lawrence Railroad and Transportation Company, with tracks in Pennsylvania and Ohio, is reorganized as the Lawrence Railroad Company.

=== September events ===
- September 1 – The English company John Trevor-Barkley begins construction on the Bucharest–Giurgiu line, the first railroad line built in the territory of Romania.
- September 13 – Algernon S. Buford becomes president of the Richmond and Danville Railroad.
- September 14 – The Brockville and Ottawa Railway begins operations between Arnprior and Sand Point, Ontario, a distance of about 6 miles (10 km).

=== October events ===
- October 2 – First section of Sri Lanka Railways, at this time known as Ceylon Government Railways, officially opens from Colombo to Ambepussa (54 km (34 mi)) on 5 ft 6in (1676 mm) gauge.
- October 18 – Almelo railway station in the Netherlands is opened.

=== December events ===
- December 20 – Alkmaar railway station in the Netherlands is opened.

=== Unknown date events ===
- The United Kingdom Institution of Civil Engineers forms the Engineer and Railway Staff Corps.
- The Union Pacific Railway, later to become the Missouri–Kansas–Texas Railroad and not to be confused with the Union Pacific Railroad, begins operations.
- A group of businessmen in San Francisco, led by Timothy Guy Phelps, found the Southern Pacific Railroad to build a rail connection between San Francisco and San Diego.
- Erastus Corning resigns from his executive post for the New York Central Railroad.
- The Canadian Engine and Machinery Company, predecessor of the Canadian Locomotive Company, is founded from the assets of the bankrupt Kingston Locomotive Works.
- Missouri Car and Foundry Company, later to become part of American Car and Foundry, is founded in St. Louis, Missouri.
- Pittsburgh & Steubenville Extension Railroad Tunnel opens for rail service.

== Births ==
=== March births ===
- March 2 – Frederick Methvan Whyte, mechanical engineer for the New York Central Railroad, creator of Whyte notation for the classification of steam locomotives (d. 1941).

=== October births ===
- October 9 – George Hughes, Chief Mechanical Engineer for the Lancashire and Yorkshire Railway 1904–1922, the London and North Western Railway 1922–1923 and the London, Midland and Scottish Railway 1925–1931 (d. 1945).

== Deaths ==
=== Unknown date deaths ===
- William T. James, American inventor of the link motion and spark arrester (b. 1786).
