= Arras–Dunkirk railway =

French railway

Coordinates: 50.6580°N 2.4802°E

Arras-Dunkirk railway
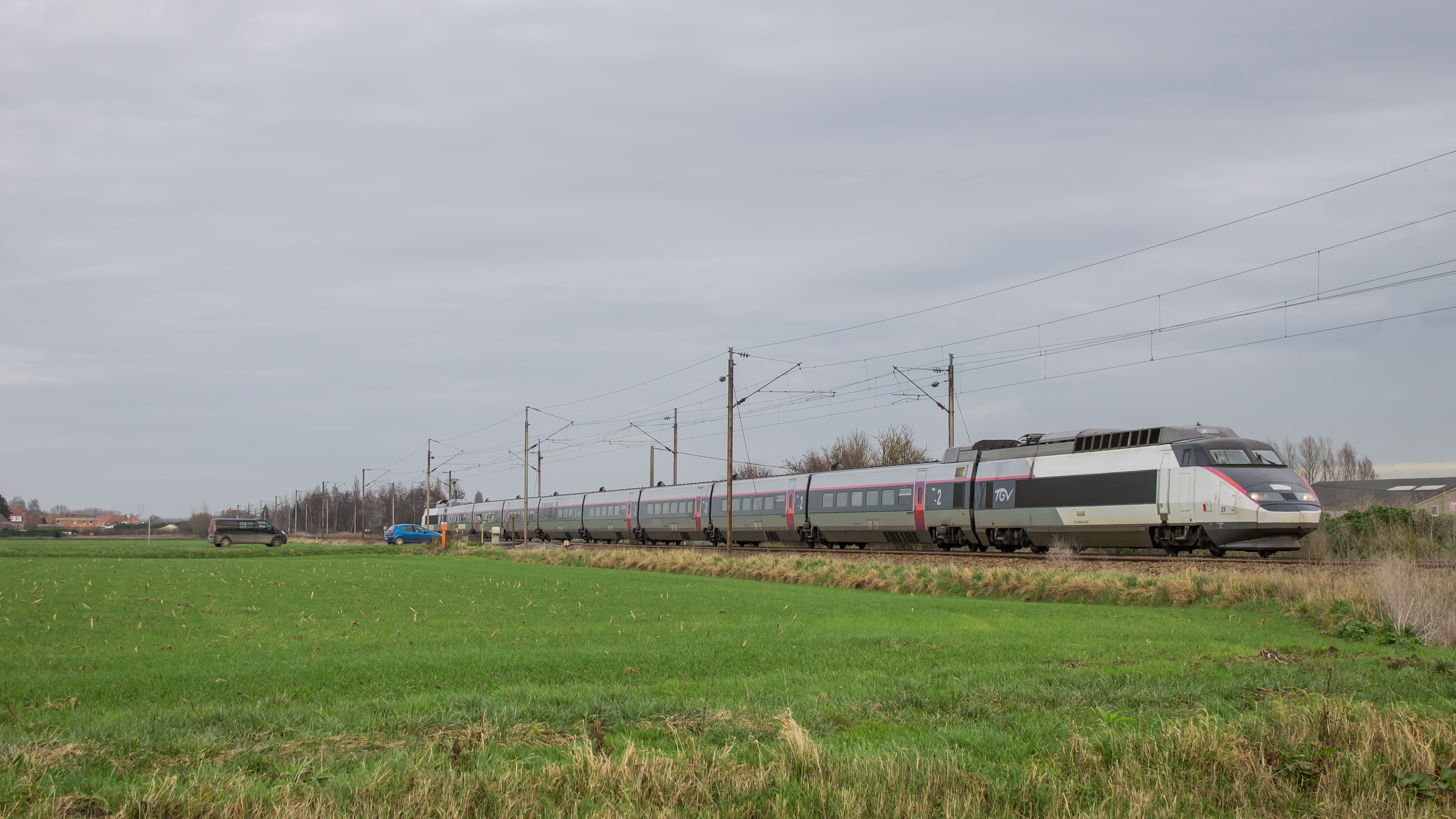
- A TGV Sud-Est train on the Arras-Dunkirk railway line in 2015

Overview
- Status: Operational
- Owner: RFF
- Locale: France Nord-Pas-de-Calais
- Termini: Gare d'Arras; Gare de Dunkerque

Service
- System: SNCF
- Operator(s): SNCF

History
- Opened: 1848-1861

Technical
- Line length: 113 km (70 mi)
- Number of tracks: Double track
- Track gauge: 1,435 mm (4 ft 8 1/2 in) standard gauge
- Electrification: 25 kV 50 Hz
Route map
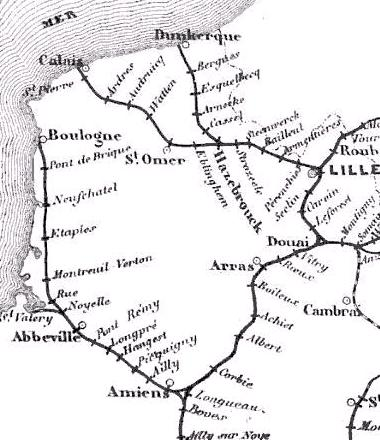

The Arras–Dunkirk railway is a French railway which runs from Arras to Dunkirk. Electrified double track it is 113 kilometres (70 miles) long.

== Services ==
As of 2022 the line is used for TGV services from Dunkirk and Saint-Omer to Paris via Hazebrouck and Arras, and for local TER Hauts-de-France services. A TER-GV service between Dunkirk and Lille-Europe uses the northern section of the line before accessing LGV Nord at Cassel.

== History ==
The line was built in two stages. In 1848 the section from a junction with the Lille-Calais railway at Hazebrouck to Dunkirk was opened. The section from Arras to Hazebrouck was opened in 1861, and this became part of the route for trains between Paris and London via Calais until the Boulogne-Calais railway opened in 1867.
