= Frederick Methvan Whyte =

American mechanical engineer (1865–1941)

- Born: 2 March 1865
- Died: 1941 (aged 75–76); Athens, Hellenic State
- Occupation: Mechanical engineer
- Employer: New York Central

Frederick Methvan Whyte (March 2, 1865 – 1941 Athens) was a mechanical engineer of Dutch background who worked for the New York Central Railroad in the United States. He is most widely known as the person who developed the Whyte notation to describe the different wheel arrangements of steam locomotives in 1900.

In some railroad literature, he is referenced as "F. M. White," using the Anglicized spelling of his name. Further, some references also spell his middle name as "Methven."

== Career ==
Education: Franklin Academy, 1889. Entered railway service May 1, 1889, since when he was consecutively to January 1, 1890, draftsman, Motive Power Department, Lake Shore and Michigan Southern Railway; January 1, 1889, to February 1, 1892, Testing Department and Drawing Room, Baltimore and Ohio Railroad at Baltimore, Maryland; February 1, 1892, to June 1892, special testing work, Mexican Central Railroad, Mexico City; June 1892, to December 1894, general railroad engineering in Chicago, chiefly with Chicago and South Side Rapid Transit Railroad and in railway newspaper work; July 1895, to September 1896, draftsman, Northwestern Elevated Railroad, Chicago; July 1, 1897, consulting engineer, Chicago; July 1, 1897, to August 10, 1899, mechanical engineer, Chicago and North Western Railway and secretary, Western Railway Club; August 15, 1899, to November 1, 1904, mechanical engineer, New York Central and Hudson River Railroad; November 1, 1904, to 1910, general mechanical engineer, same road; Lake Shore and Michigan Southern, Boston and Albany Railroad, Lake Erie and Western Railroad, and Indiana, Illinois and Iowa Railroad; September 15, 1905, to 1910, also general mechanical engineer Rutland Railroad; November 1, 1911, to 1913, vice-president, Hutchins Car Roofing.

Whyte visited Australia in 1921 as one of three members of the Royal Commission on the matter of Uniform Railway Gauge, whose report was presented on 12 October 1921. He was greeted on arrival in Melbourne (then the Federal capital) by Prime Minister William Morris Hughes and travelled widely throughout the country by train. The other Royal Commissioners were R.K. White, a British engineer from India, and John Joseph Garvan (chair), a Sydney businessman. The Commissioners suggested five options for standardisation of Australia's railways. The two concrete results were (1) the construction of the standard gauge railway from Grafton to South Brisbane, opened in 1930 and (2) the extension of Commonwealth Railways' standard-gauge Trans Australia Railway from Port Augusta to Port Pirie in 1937. Both these railways eliminated sections of narrow-gauge (3 ft 6 in or 1,070 mm) railway between Australia's capital cities.
