= Roubaix station =

Railway station in Roubaix, France

Coordinates: 50°41′45″N 3°09′47″E

Roubaix
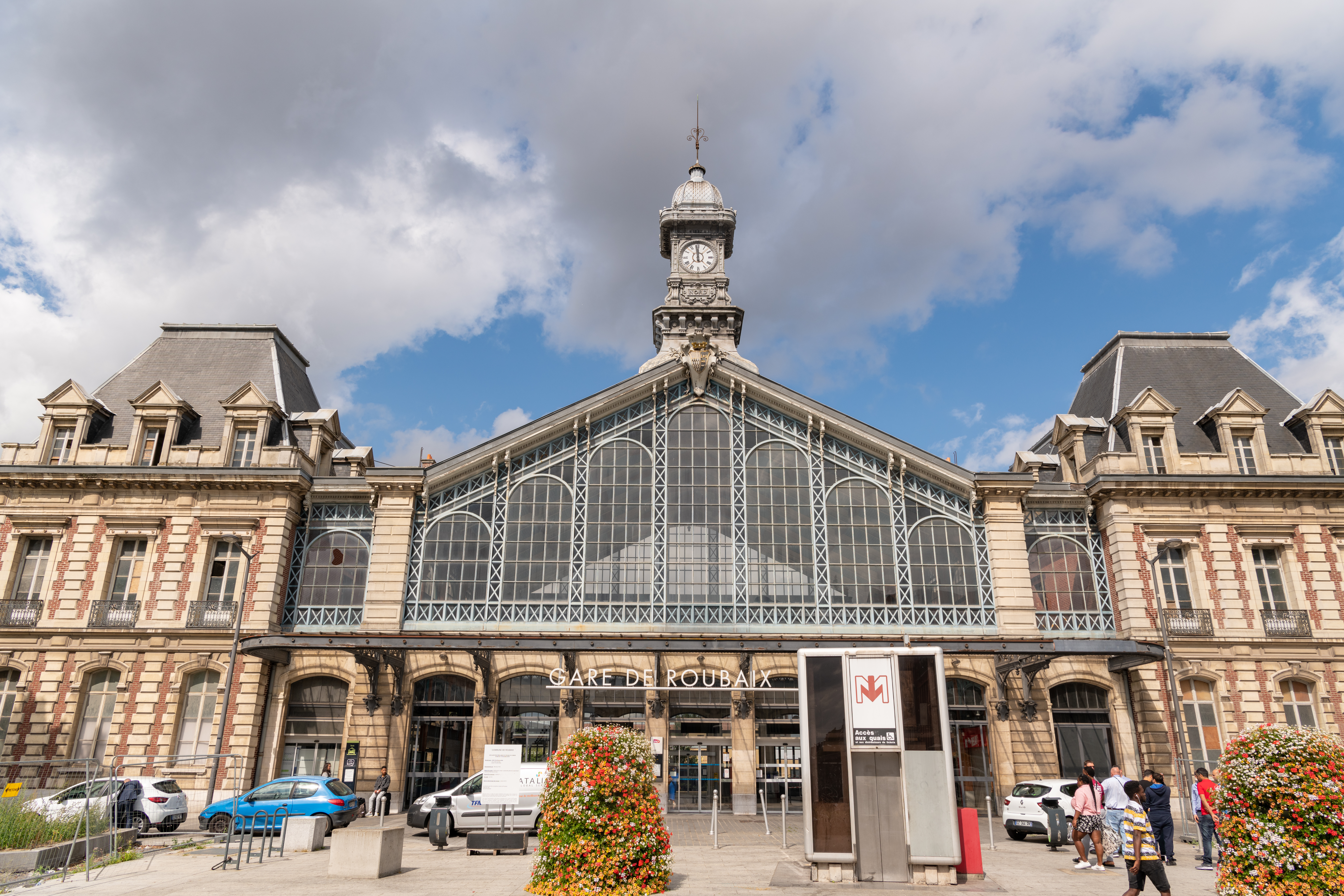
- Passenger building and metro entrance in 2019.

General information
- Location: Place de la Gare; 59100 Roubaix; Nord, France
- Elevation: 42 m (138 ft)
- Owner: SNCF
- Operator: SNCF
- Platforms: 2
- Tracks: 2

Construction
- Architect: Sidney Dunnett (1888 station)

History
- Opened: November 1842

Passengers
- 2019: 221,272
Location

Roubaix station (French: Gare de Roubaix) is a railway station serving the town Roubaix, Nord department, northern France.

== Services ==
The station is served by high speed trains to Paris and regional trains to Lille and Kortrijk (Belgium).

Preceding station	SNCF	Following station
Croix-Wasquehal towards Paris-Nord	TGV	Tourcoing Terminus
Preceding station	TER Hauts-de-France	Following station
Lille-Flandres Terminus	Krono K80	Tourcoing towards Kortrijk
Croix-l'Allumette towards Lille-Flandres	Proxi P80	Tourcoing Terminus
