= Gare du Nord =

Terminal railway station in Paris, France

Paris-Nord
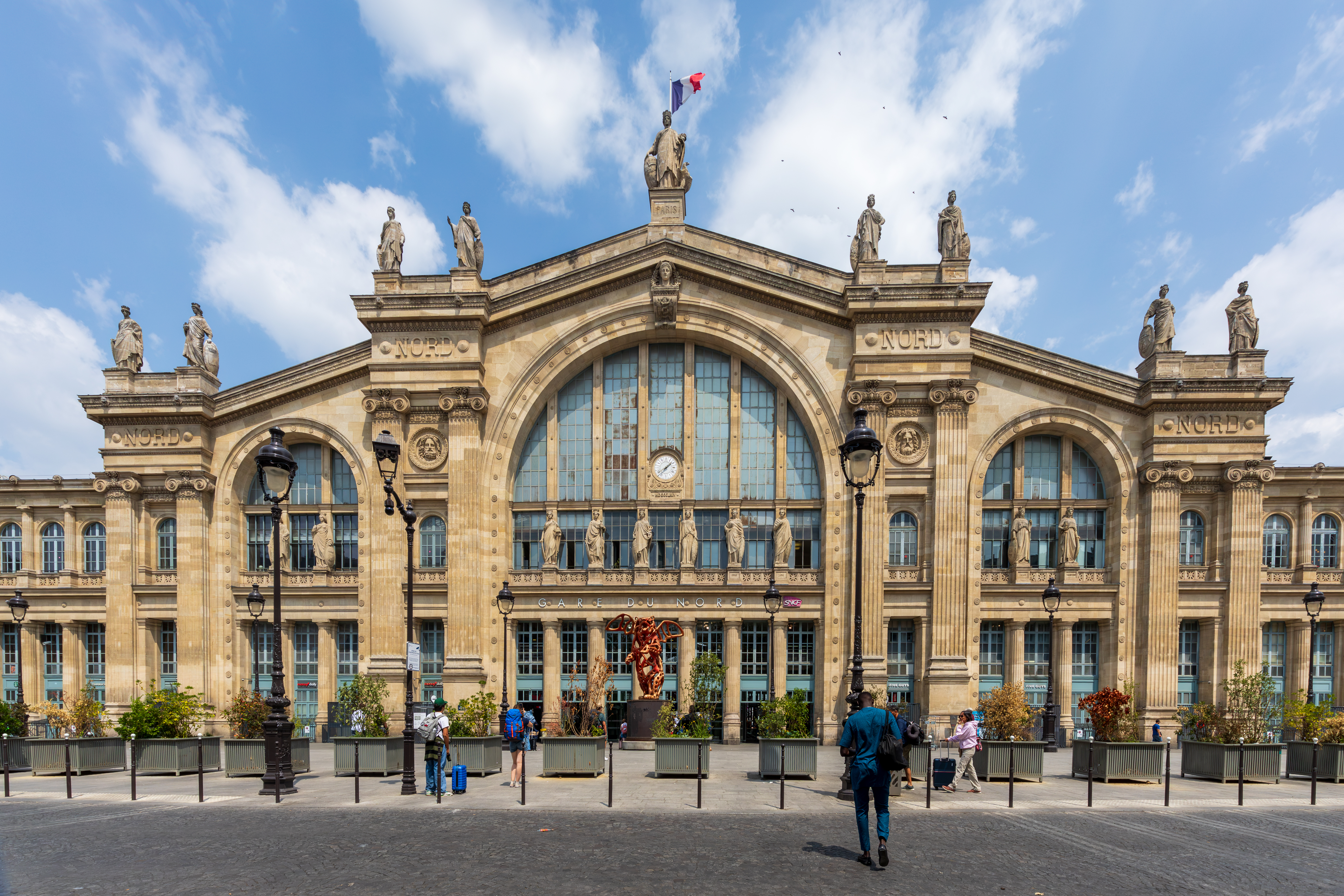
- Main front of the Gare du Nord

General information
- Location: 112 Rue de Maubeuge; Paris; France
- Coordinates: 48°52′52″N 02°21′19″E
- Operator: SNCF Gares & Connexions
- Line: Paris–Lille railway
- Tracks: 32
- Connections: (at Gare du Nord); (at La Chapelle); (at Gare du Nord); at Magenta

Construction
- Structure type: At-grade
- Platform levels: 2
- Accessible: Yes
- Architect: Jacques Ignace Hittorff

Other information
- Station code: 87271007
- IATA code: XPG
- Fare zone: 1

History
- Opened: 20 June 1846
- Rebuilt: 1891, 1930s, 1960s

Passengers
- 2024: 257,024,152
- Rank: Busiest in Europe
Services
Preceding station	Eurostar	Following station
Terminus	Eurostar	Brussels-South towards Amsterdam Centraal
Terminus	Eurostar	Brussels-South towards Dortmund Hbf
Lille-Europe towards London	Eurostar	Terminus
Preceding station	SNCF	Following station
Terminus	TGV	Lille-Flandres towards Lille-Flandres or Tourcoing
Terminus	TGV	Lille-Europe towards Calais-Ville
Terminus	TGV	Lille-Europe towards Boulogne-Ville or Rang-du-Fliers
Terminus	TGV	Arras towards Dunkerque
Terminus	TGV	Arras towards Valenciennes
Preceding station	Transilien	Following station
Terminus	Line H	Saint-Denis towards Pontoise, Persan–Beaumont or Luzarches
Terminus	Line K	Aulnay-sous-Bois towards Crépy-en-Valois
Preceding station	TER Hauts-de-France	Following station
Creil towards Amiens	Krono K10	Terminus
Terminus	Krono K12	Creil towards Lille-Flandres
Compiègne towards Cambrai or Maubeuge	Krono K13	Terminus
Creil towards Saint-Quentin	Krono K14	Terminus
Terminus	Krono K15	Dammartin-Juilly-Saint-Mard towards Laon
Terminus	Krono K16	Longueau towards Calais
Orry-la-Ville-Coye towards Amiens	Citi C10	Terminus
Terminus	Citi C17	Persan-Beaumont towards Beauvais
Preceding station	RER	Following station
La Plaine Stade de France towards Aéroport Charles de Gaulle 2 TGV or Mitry–Claye	RER B	Châtelet towards Robinson or Saint-Rémy-lès-Chevreuse
Stade de France–Saint-Denis towards Creil	RER D	Châtelet towards Corbeil-Essonnes
Stade de France–Saint-Denis towards Goussainville	RER D	Châtelet towards Melun
Connections to other stations
Preceding station	RER	Following station
Haussmann–Saint-Lazare towards Nanterre–La Folie	RER E transfer at Magenta	Rosa Parks towards Chelles–Gournay or Tournan
Preceding station	Paris Metro	Following station
Barbès–Rochechouart towards Porte Dauphine	Line 2 transfer at La Chapelle	Stalingrad towards Nation
Gare de l'Est towards Bagneux–Lucie Aubrac	Line 4 transfer at Gare du Nord	Barbès–Rochechouart towards Porte de Clignancourt
Gare de l'Est towards Place d'Italie	Line 5 transfer at Gare du Nord	Stalingrad towards Bobigny–Pablo Picasso
Location
- Location within Paris Location within Île-de-France (region) Location within France

The Gare du Nord (pronounced [ɡaʁ dy nɔːʁ]; English: North Station), officially Paris-Nord, is one of the seven large mainline railway station termini in Paris, France, and Europe's busiest railway station.

Gare du Nord is the Paris terminal station of the Eurostar network and serves international destinations in Belgium, Germany, the Netherlands, and the United Kingdom as well as northern France and the northern outskirts of Paris. Located in the northern part of Paris together with nearby Gare de l'Est in the 10th arrondissement, the Gare du Nord offers connections with several urban transport lines, including Paris Métro, RER and RATP buses.

The current building was constructed between 1861 and 1864 on a design by architect Jacques Ignace Hittorff, on behalf of the Chemin de Fer du Nord company which was headquartered on an adjacent site. It replaced an earlier and smaller terminal which was operational between 1846 and 1860, some of which was reassembled as Lille-Flandres station.

== History ==
=== First building ===
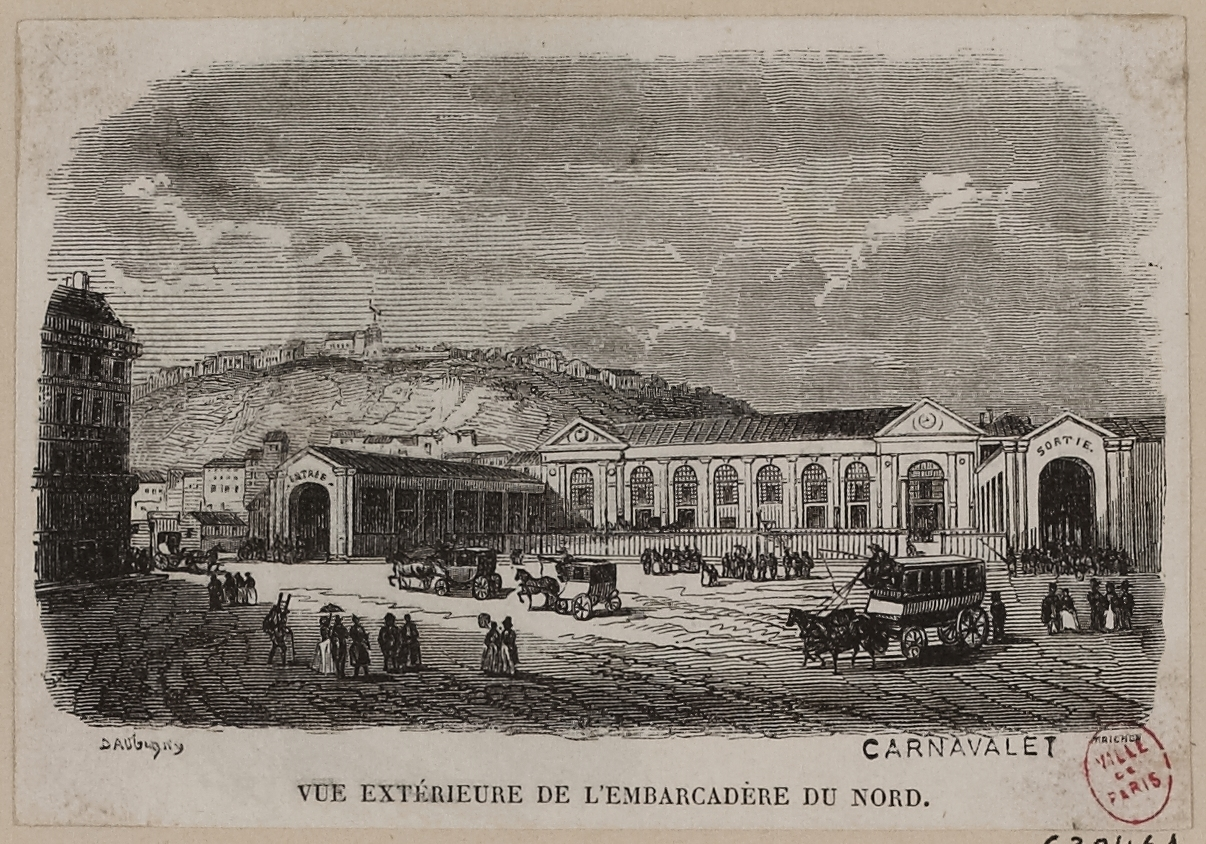
First Gare du Nord terminal

The first Gare du Nord was constructed on behalf of the Chemins de fer du Nord company, which was managed by Léonce Reynaud, professor of architecture at the École Polytechnique. During 1843, the engineer Onfroy de Bréville, having been placed in charge of the first section of the company's proposed line between Paris and Amiens, produced a report that considered two different options for the terminal station. Management opted to construct the less spacious of the two options, despite the occurrence of stations serving capital city becoming overwhelmed already being a known phenomenon in both London and Brussels. For his part, de Bréville promoted the smaller option as being more than adequate to meet demand and reducing its impact on the existing neighbourhood of Clos Saint-Lazare; it was also considerably cheaper than the larger alternative option.

The engineer and architect Francois-Leonce Reynaud was appointed to design the station itself. In terms of its basic configuration, the station accommodated a total of six tracks and two large platforms underneath a single shed. This shed, which was divided into two naves, was supported by a series of cast iron columns and wooden trusses; the structure featured a relatively distinctive drainage system that used the hollow columns as drain pipes directly into the city's sewers. Road traffic was directed to a large courtyard set to the side of the station.

On 14 June 1846, the first Gare du Nord station was inaugurated; that same year, the Paris–Lille railway was also declared to be operational. During the following decade, not only was there a major boom in railway traffic as the French network rapidly expanded, Napoleon III himself heavily advocated for grand investments in infrastructure to be made, with the railways being a prime recipient of the French state's attention. During the late 1850s, it had become clear that the original Gare du Nord would be far too small to accommodate the demands of a major terminal station, thus it was decided to replace it entirely. The decision to redevelop the station was considerably eased by the expense of doing so being shared between the company and the city. Accordingly, the station building was partially demolished in 1860 to provide space for the current station; the original station's façade was removed and transferred to Lille station (now Lille-Flandres).

=== Current building ===
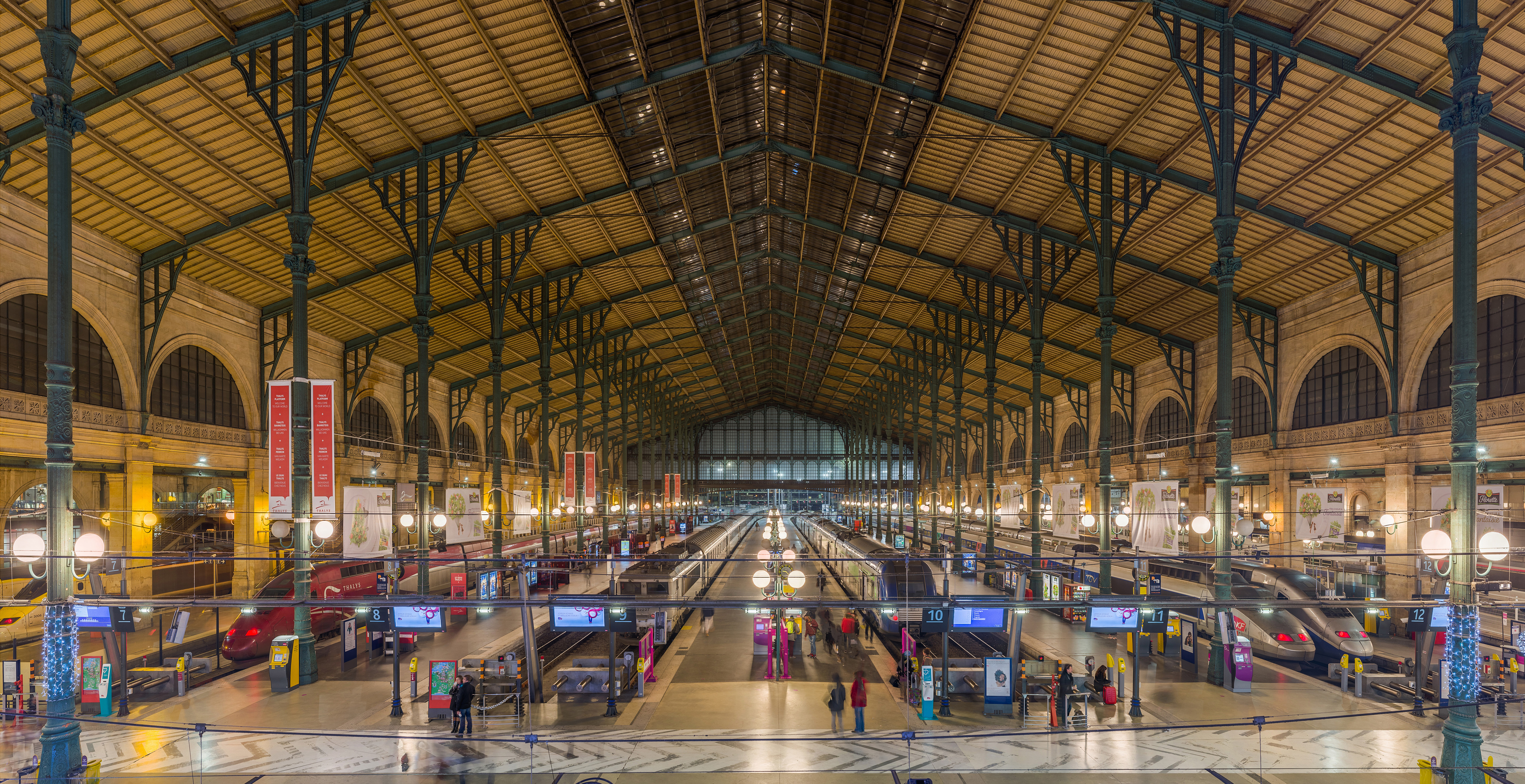
Main hall

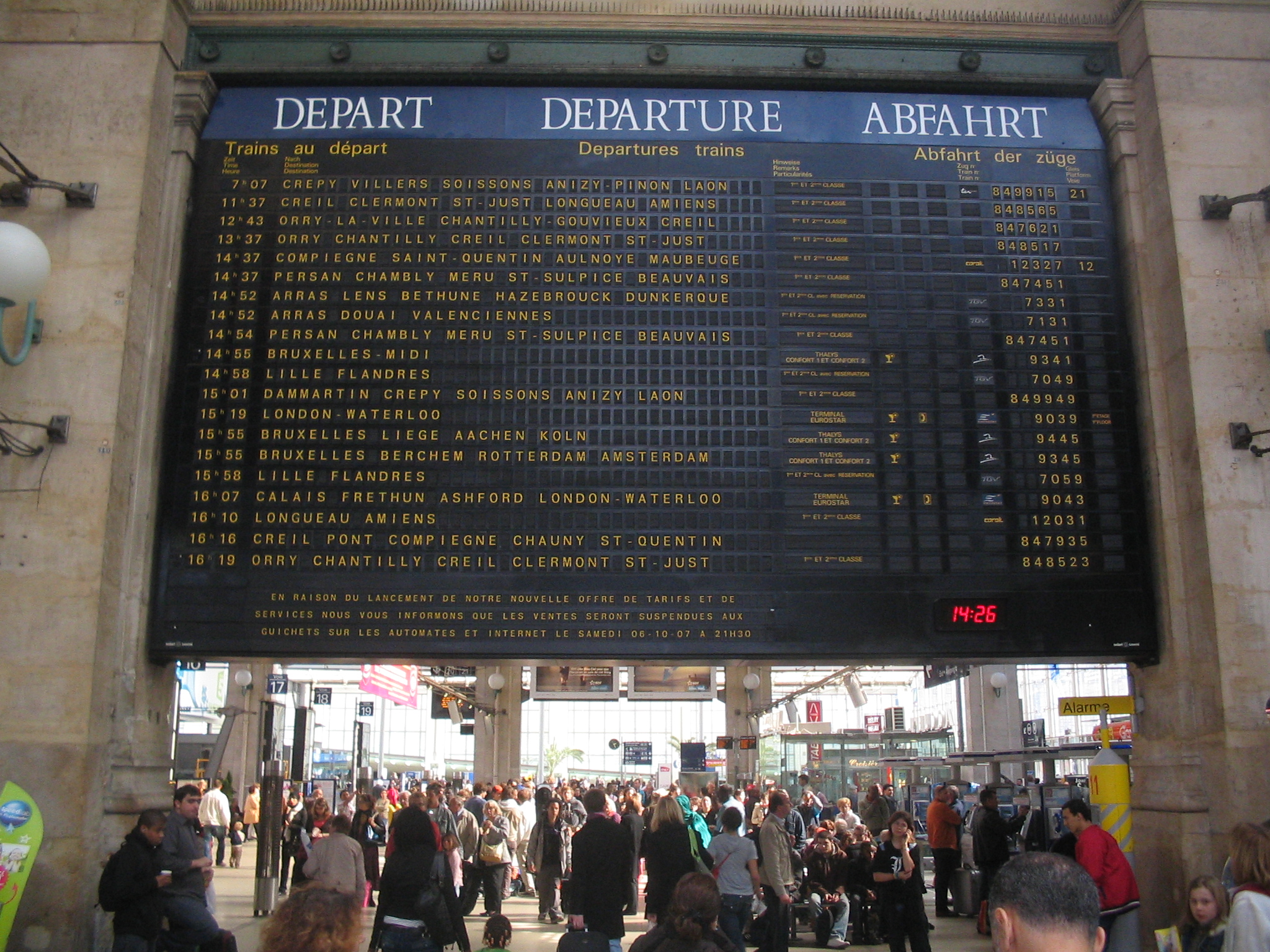
Former departure board showing typical destinations

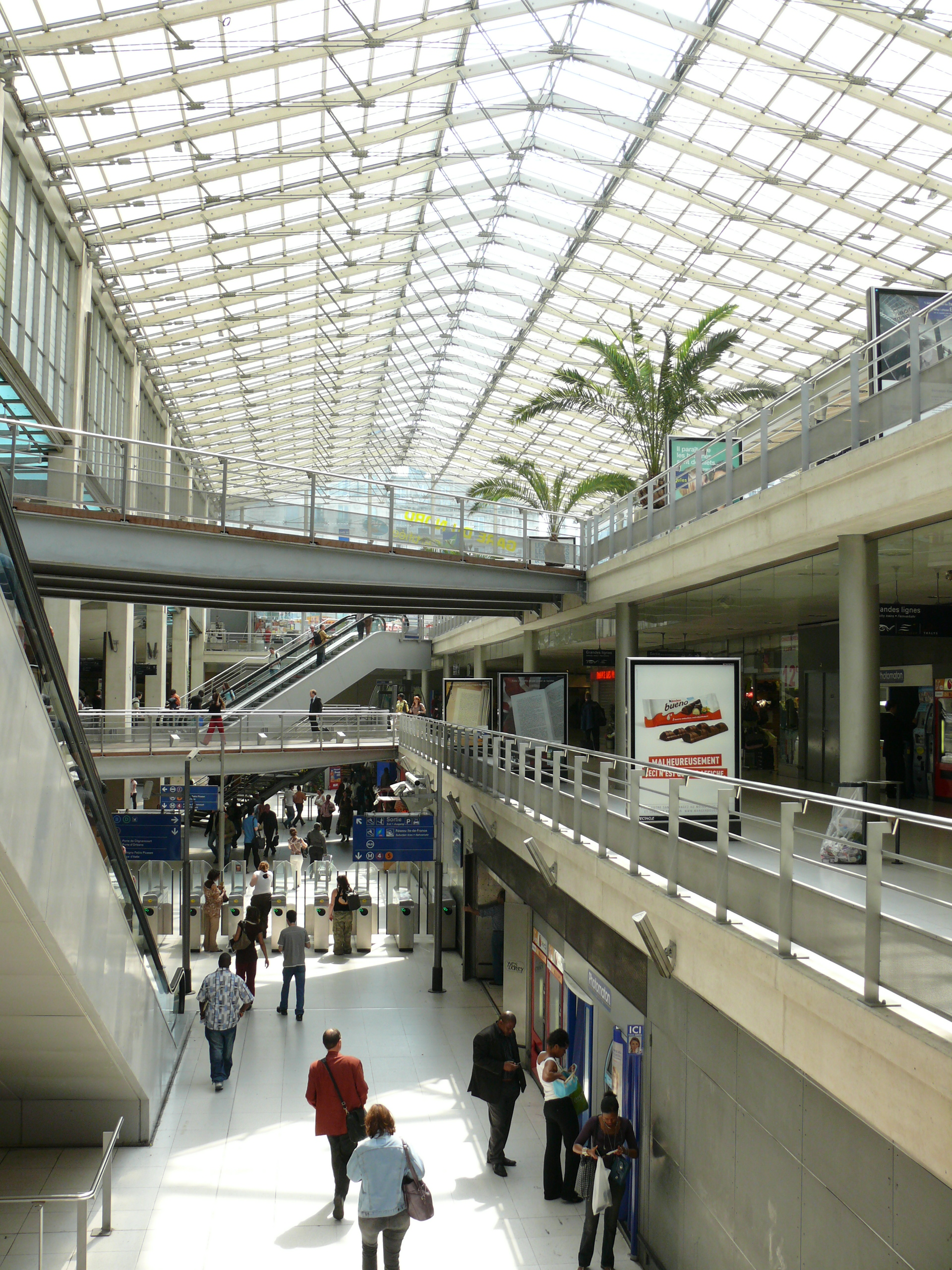
Eastern hall serving metro and RER lines, designed by Jean-Marie Duthilleul, Étienne Tricaud and Daniel Claris, opened in 2001

The chairman of the Chemin de Fer du Nord railway company, James Mayer de Rothschild, chose the French architect Jacques Ignace Hittorff to design the current station. Construction of the new complex was carried out between May 1861 to December 1865; the new station actually opened for service while still under construction during 1864. The façade was designed around a triumphal arch and used many slabs of stone. The building has the usual U-shape of a terminus station. The main support beam is made out of cast iron. The support pillars inside the station were made at Alston & Gourley's ironworks in Glasgow in the United Kingdom, the only country with a foundry large enough for the task.

On the main façade are allegorical sculptures that represent the principal cities served by the company at the time of construction. At the top stands Paris sculpted by Pierre-Jules Cavelier, surrounded by eight international destinations: from west to east (left to right), Frankfurt (by Gabriel Thomas), Amsterdam (by Charles Gumery), Warsaw and Brussels (by François Jouffroy), London and Vienna (by Jean-Louis Jaley), Berlin (by Jean-Joseph Perraud), and Cologne (by Mathurin Moreau). Lower down are the destinations in France, also from west to east: Boulogne and Compiegne by Cavelier, Saint-Quentin and Cambrai by Auguste Ottin, Beauvais and Lille by Charles-François Lebœuf, Amiens and Rouen by Eugène-Louis Lequesne, Arras and Laon by Théodore-Charles Gruyère, Calais and Valenciennes by Philippe Joseph Henri Lemaire, and Douai and Dunkirk by Gustave Crauck.

It was originally planned that a monumental avenue would be constructed leading up to the station's façade, cutting through the old street layout. Between 1838 and 1859, around a dozen separate proposals to redevelop the streets around Gare du Nord were tabled. However, no such redevelopment ever happened despite the extensive rebuilding of Paris headed by the Baron Georges-Eugène Haussmann; the Gare du Nord's absence from Haussmann's work has been referred to as "exhibiting arbitrariness and inconsistency". According to the railway historian Micheline Nilsen, the decision not to proceed with the redevelopment has been typically attributed to Haussmann and his personal displeasure that the city would have to bear such great expense on behalf of the Gare du Nord, and that Haussmann's overall attitude led to a pronounced understatement of the railways. Be that as it may, the station has persistently suffered problems with a lack of space and poor access.

=== Further development ===
Like other Parisian railway stations, the Gare du Nord rapidly proved to be too small to handle persistent increases in railway traffic. Accordingly, the station has been periodically reconfigured. During 1884, engineers were able to install five supplementary tracks. During 1889, the station's interior was completely rebuilt, while an extension was constructed along its eastern side to serve the suburban rail lines. Further rounds of expansion work were carried out between the 1930s and the 1960s.

Beginning in 1906 and 1908, the station was served by the Metro Line 4 (which crosses Paris from north to south) and the terminus of Metro Line 5 (which ran to Étoile through Place d'Italie. In 1942, Line 5 was extended towards the northern suburbs of Pantin and Bobigny, while its south terminus was set to Place d'Italie. Metro Line 2 (station La Chapelle) is linked to the Gare du Nord by a long, arched circular underground passageway.

During 1994, the arrival of high speed Eurostar international services required another reorganisation of the rail tracks:

- Tracks 1 and 2: Service platforms, not open to the public.
- Tracks 3 to 6: Eurostar trains to/from London. Access to these trains is from the upper level after border controls.
- Tracks 7 and 8: Eurostar trains to/from Belgium, Germany and the Netherlands.
- Tracks 9 to 21: TGV and TER Hauts-de-France
- Tracks 30 to 36 (Suburban station extension): Transilien Lines H and K
- Tracks 41 and 44 (underground, level -3): RER D
- Tracks 42 and 43 (underground, level -3): RER B

It is also connected to the Gare du Nord Métro station (Line 4 and Line 5, 2 platforms), La Chapelle Métro station (Line 2, 2 platforms) and Magenta station (RER E, 4 platforms).

After the 'Additional Protocol to the Sangatte Protocol' was signed by France and the United Kingdom on 29 May 2000, juxtaposed controls were set up in the station. Eurostar passengers travelling to the UK clear exit checks from the Schengen Area (carried out by the French Border Police and French Customs) as well as UK entry checks (conducted by the UK Border Force) in the station before boarding their train. PARAFE self-service gates are available in the station which eligible passengers (EU, EEA and Swiss citizens aged 12 or above holding biometric passports) can use to clear French exit immigration checks (instead of a staffed counter). ePassport gates have also been installed in the station, which eligible passengers (UK, EU, EEA, Swiss, Australian, Canadian, Japanese, New Zealand, Singaporean, South Korean and United States citizens as well as other foreign nationals who have applied for the Registered Traveller scheme aged 12 or over holding biometric passports) can use to clear UK entry immigration instead of a staffed counter.

By 2015, the Gare du Nord was reportedly the busiest railway station in Europe, handling in excess of 700,000 passengers during a typical day. Most of these passengers are commuters travelling in from the northern suburbs of Paris and outlying towns; only 3 per cent of the traffic has been attributed to Eurostar's international services.

There is a further construction project to build a connecting underground passageway between Gare du Nord and Gare de l'Est, which is projected to open in 2027. When open the Gare du Nord-Gare de l'Est complex (including Magenta & La Chapelle) will have 77 platforms.

Security for the station is provided by the French National Police, the railways police and private security companies. Due to the position of the station as a gateway to the northern suburbs of Paris, there are some parts of the station where security incidents occur from time to time.

=== Late 2010s refurbishment project ===
The SNCF has long sought to improve the station to better handle traffic, particularly following the expansion of high speed rail services during the 1990s and 2000s accompanied by rising passenger numbers. By 2015, 700,000 passengers were using the Gare du Nord each day; projections produced in 2018 predicted these numbers to rise to 800,000 by 2024 and 900,000 by 2030. During 2015, the architect Jean-Michel Wilmotte was engaged by SNCF with the directive to "open the station towards the city". According to SNCF Project Director Stéphane Cougnon, the programme has a budget in excess of 600 million euros (£526m). The endeavour has the public backing of Paris's mayor, Anne Hidalgo, who has also pledged to address the frequent traffic problems in front of the station by reconfiguring its approaches. Critics of the redevelopment have included several architects and urban planners, who have typically objected to the high level of commercialisation involved.

The changes to the Gare du Nord shall be substantial, expanding its footprint to roughly two and a half times its pre-refurbishment footprint, turning it into the largest railway station in Europe. The expansion shall be facilitated largely by increasing the building's height, as well as by pulling back the outer walls in several places. The work shall build upon the existing philosophy of keeping arriving and departing passengers separated; all mainline departures are to be centralised within a new building alongside the eastern façade. To improve the station's interconnectivity with the rest of the city, the SNCF has reportedly considered the construction of a new eastern façade along the rue du Faubourg Saint-Denis to give direct access to the new departures terminal, as well as a new bus terminal.

Various new onsite amenities shall be provisioned across 50,000 m^{2} (540,000 sq ft) of floorspace, representing a five-fold increase. Amongst the various retailers and commercial operations planned are two restaurants that are to operate on the station's roof, along with a gym, tennis court, putting range, 1,000 m (3,300 ft) fitness trail along the façade, and in excess of 7,000 m^{2} (75,000 sq ft) of green space. To improve accessibility throughout, a total of 55 lifts and 105 escalators shall be installed, more than doubling the pre-redevelopment number. Eco-friendly considerations have also been made, conforming with the demanding BREEAM standards and incorporating features such as 3,200 m^{2} (34,000 sq ft) of solar panels. Despite the ambitious scope, great care shall be taken to preserving its historic architecture and appearance, the station having been regarded as a national heritage site in its own right. The project has reportedly been modelled using several other major stations, including London St Pancras and New York's Grand Central Terminal.

During June 2019, a city commission opted to initially deny a construction permit associated with the project. Nonetheless, work commenced on the refurbishment during late 2019, and is scheduled to be completed during late 2023. The station will remain open during the renovations despite the increased technical challenge posed by doing so, the cost of closure being judged to be too great. Substantial planning has gone into minimising disruption and maximising passenger comfort throughout the programme. Some portions of the station, such as the relatively recent facilities for Eurostar services, shall remain relatively untouched. In addition to work on the station site itself, SNCF shall be making alterations along the entire northern corridor within this period in association with the redevelopment work.

== Train services ==
As of December 2026, the following services call at Paris Nord:

Operator(s)	Routes
European Sleeper	Paris – Brussels – Hamburg – Berlin
Eurostar	Paris – London; Paris – Brussels – Rotterdam – Amsterdam; Paris – Brussels – Cologne – Düsseldorf – Essen – Dortmund
GoVolta	Paris – Gent – Rotterdam – Amsterdam
SNCF Voyageurs Ouigo	Paris – Mons – Brussels
SNCF Voyageurs TGV	Paris – Lille – Tourcoing; Paris – Lille – Calais – Boulogne – Rang-du-Fliers; Paris – Lille – Dunkerque; Paris – Arras – Béthune – Dunkerque; Paris – Arras – Douai – Valenciennes
Transilien	Line H: Paris – Saint-Denis – Montsoult–Maffliers – Luzarches; Line H: Paris – Saint-Denis – Montsoult–Maffliers – Persan–Beaumont; Line H: Paris – Saint-Denis – Ermont–Eaubonne – Persan–Beaumont; Line H: Paris – Saint-Denis – Ermont–Eaubonne – Pontoise; Line K: Paris – Aulnay-sous-Bois – Mitry-Claye – Crépy-en-Valois
TER Hauts-de-France	Paris – Crépy-en-Valois – Soissons – Laon; Paris – Creil – Compiègne – Tergnier – Saint-Quentin; Paris – Persan–Beaumont – Beauvais; Paris – Orry-la-Ville – Creil – Saint-Just-en-Chaussée – Breteuil – Amiens

=== RER ===
Gare du Nord is connected to the Paris RER network.

Line B stops at tracks 42 and 43, while Line D stops at tracks 41 and 44. All four tracks are located on level -3, under the main station. Line B trains serve either Charles de Gaulle Airport or Mitry – Claye north of the city, and Antony (for Orly Airport), Massy-Palaiseau (for Massy TGV) or Saint-Rémy-lès-Chevreuse south of the city. Line D offers a quick connection between Gare du Nord and Gare de Lyon and many areas of south-east Paris. Line D also operates to northern Paris, to Saint-Denis and Creil. Both lines also serve Stade de France in Saint-Denis.

The RER station is directly connected to Magenta station, served by the RER E line. The underground connecting tunnel can be accessed from levels -1 or -2. The RER E offers a link between the Gare du Nord and Saint-Lazare/Gare Saint-Lazare and to eastern Paris, to Bondy, Chelles and Tournan-en-Brie.

=== Paris Métro ===
The Gare du Nord station of the Paris Metro is served by lines 4 and 5 and can be reached through underground connecting tunnels can be accessed from levels -1 or -2. Both stations offer a connection between Gare du Nord and Gare de l'Est.

There is also a connection to La Chapelle station on Line 2 of the Paris Metro. An underground connecting tunnel can be accessed on level -2.

== In popular culture ==
The Gare du Nord has served as a backdrop in numerous French films, such as Les Poupées Russes (2005).

In Nancy Mitford's 1945 The Pursuit of Love, Linda first meets Fabrice in the Gare du Nord when she runs out of resources and is sitting weeping on her suitcase.

In US movies, both the exterior and the interior of the Gare du Nord are seen in the 2002 film The Bourne Identity with Matt Damon and again in the trilogy's finale, The Bourne Ultimatum, released in August 2007. It was also seen in Ocean's Twelve in 2004, and Mr Bean's Holiday in 2007. The ending of the 2012 movie The Raven by James McTeigue takes place at the station.

In Syrian author Zaher Omareen's short story "The Beginner's Guide to Smuggling," the Gare du Nord is the station the protagonist uses in his travels through Paris.

Scenes of Gossip Girl's episode "Double Identity" were shot inside the Gare du Nord.

== See also ==
- List of busiest railway stations in France
- List of Paris railway stations
- List of stations of the Paris RER
- List of stations of the Paris Métro
- List of works by Henri Chapu Sculptor of statue representing Beauvais
