= Tourcoing station =

Railway station in France

Coordinates: 50°43′0″N 3°10′5″E

Tourcoing
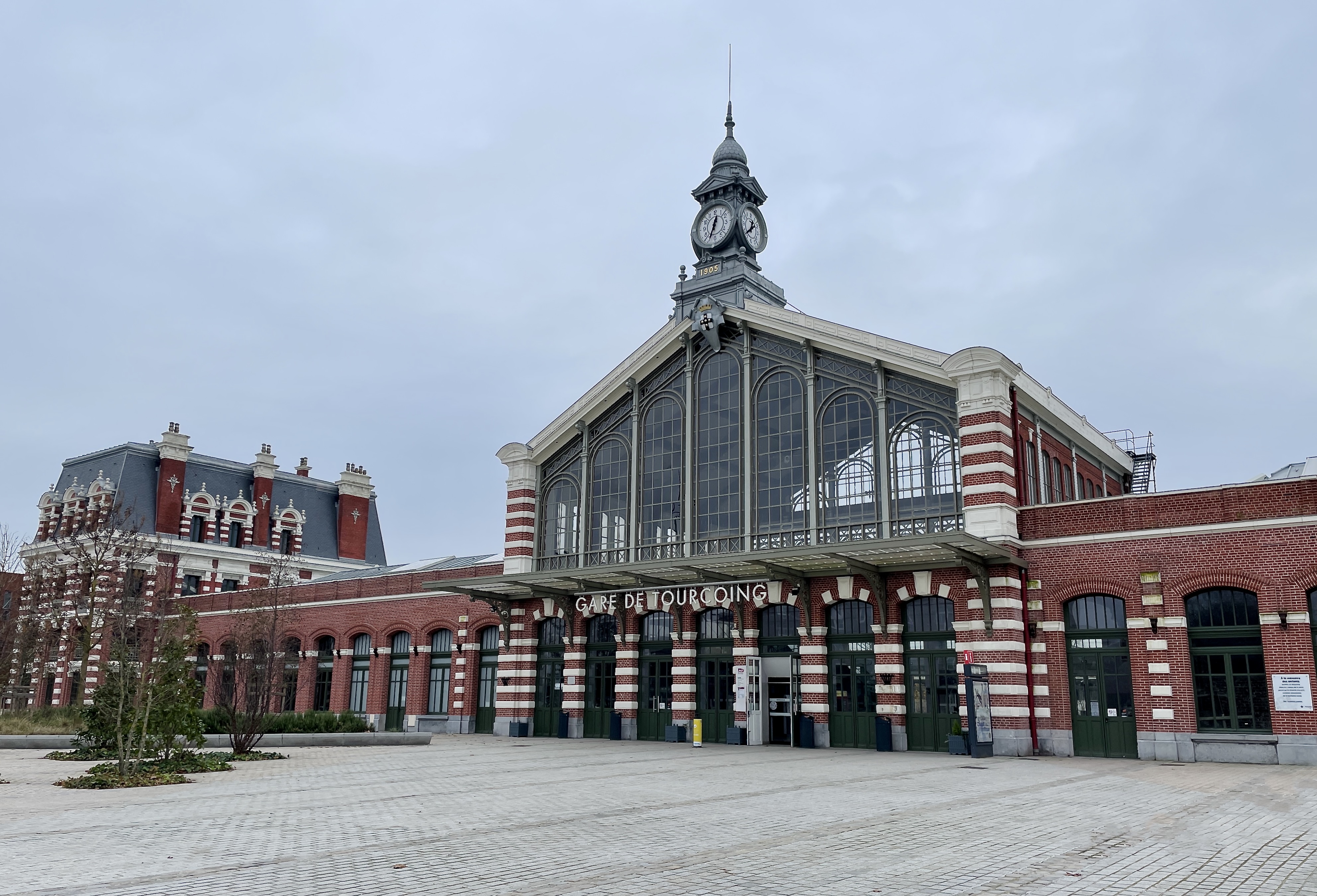

General information
- Location: 11 rue Pierre-Semard; 59200 Tourcoing; France
- Elevation: 41 m (135 ft)
- Owner: SNCF
- Operator: SNCF
- Lines: Fives–Mouscron railway Somain–Halluin railway
- Platforms: 2
- Tracks: 4

Other information
- Station code: 87286542

History
- Opened: 1905 (the station itself)

Passengers
- 2018: 731 606

Services
Preceding station	SNCF	Following station
Roubaix towards Paris-Nord	TGV	Terminus
Preceding station	Ouigo	Following station
Terminus	Grande Vitesse	Aéroport Charles de Gaulle towards Montpellier Sud de France
Terminus	Grande Vitesse	TGV Haute-Picardie towards Bordeaux
Preceding station	TER Hauts-de-France	Following station
Roubaix towards Lille-Flandres	Krono K80	Mouscron towards Kortrijk
Roubaix towards Lille-Flandres	Proxi P80	Terminus
Location

Tourcoing station (French: Gare de Tourcoing) is a railway station serving the town Tourcoing, Nord department, northern France.

== Services ==
The station is served by high speed trains to Paris and regional trains to Roubaix and Lille.

SNCB/NMBS Belgian Railways trains also run from here to: Courtrai/Kortrijk for example on Belgian railway line 75.
