= Valenciennes station =

French railway station

Valenciennes
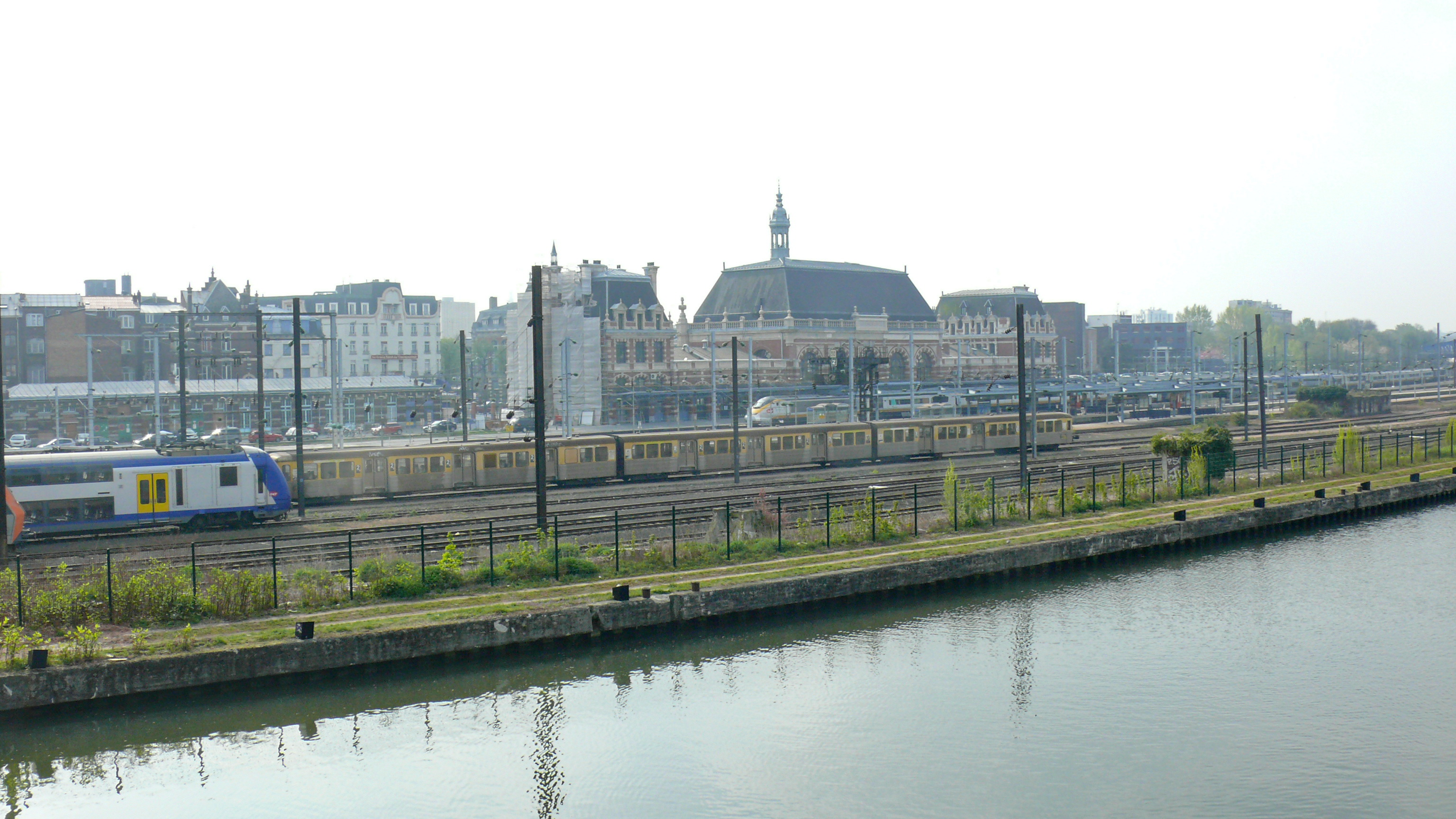
- Valenciennes railway station

General information
- Location: Place de la Gare; 59300 Valenciennes; Nord, France
- Coordinates: 50°21′48″N 3°31′1″E
- Owner: SNCF
- Operator: SNCF
- Lines: Fives–Hirson railway; Douai-Blanc-Misseron railway; Lourches–Valenciennes railway
- Platforms: 4
- Tracks: 7

Other information
- Station code: 87343004

History
- Opened: 1842

Passengers
- 2024: 3,373,297

Services
Preceding station	TER Hauts-de-France	Following station
Douai towards Arras	Krono K43	Terminus
Saint-Amand-les-Eaux towards Lille-Flandres	Krono K60	Le Poirier-Université towards Jeumont
Saint-Amand-les-Eaux towards Lille-Flandres	Krono K61	Le Poirier-Université towards Charleville-Mézières
Saint-Amand-les-Eaux towards Lille-Flandres	Citi C60	Terminus
Beuvrages towards Douai	Proxi P43	Terminus
Terminus	Proxi P60	Le Poirier-Université towards Jeumont
Terminus	Proxi P63	Trith-Saint-Léger towards Cambrai
Location

Valenciennes station (French: Gare de Valenciennes) is a French railway station serving the town of Valenciennes, Nord, France.

== Train services ==
The station is served by high speed services to Paris and by regional trains to Lille, Douai, Cambrai, Charleville-Mézières and Maubeuge.

== See also ==
- List of SNCF stations in Hauts-de-France
