= Hazebrouck station =

French railway station

Coordinates: 50°43′30″N 2°32′29″E

Hazebrouck
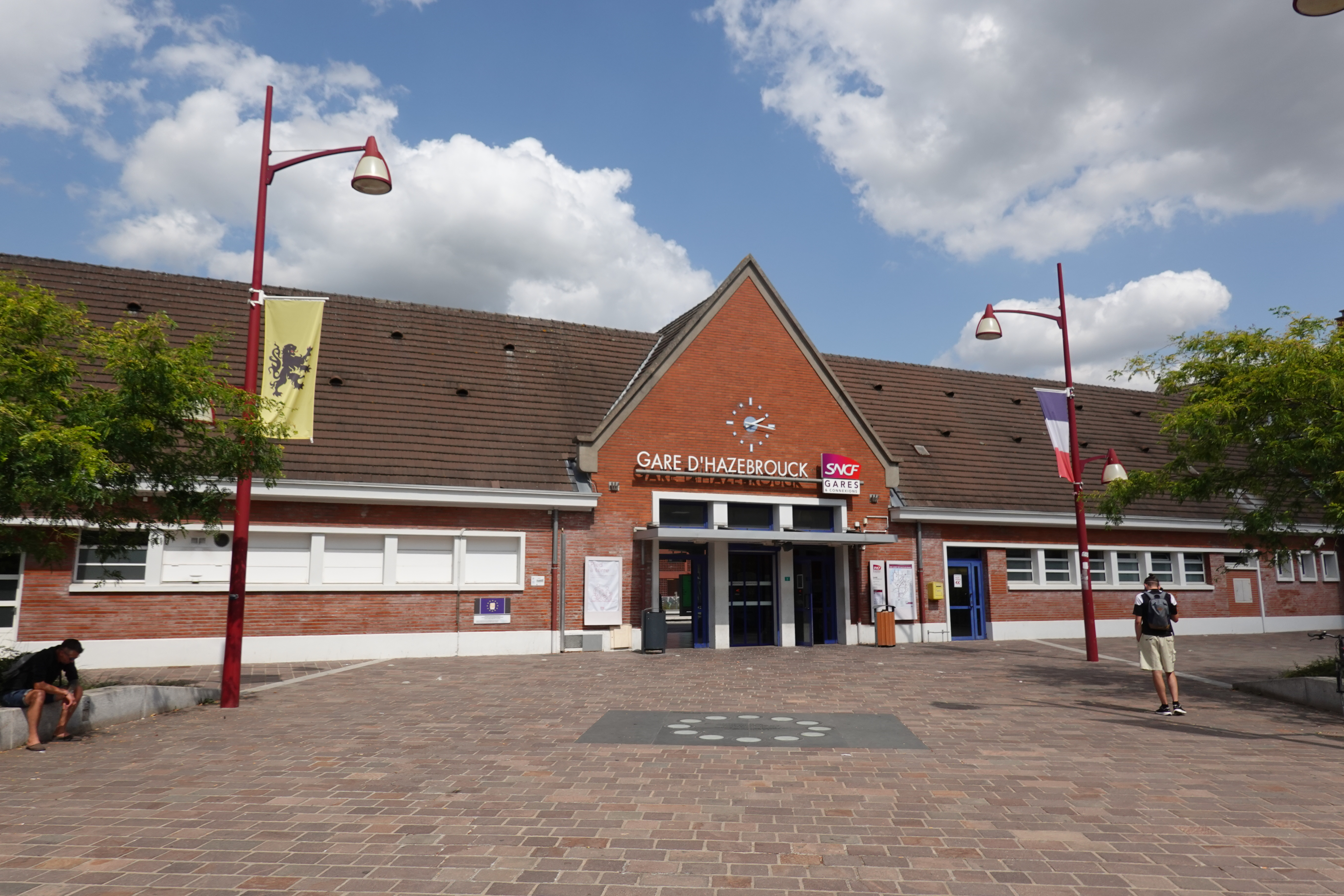

General information
- Location: Rue de la Gare; 59190 Hazebrouck, Nord; France
- Elevation: 29 m (95 ft)
- Owner: SNCF
- Operator: SNCF
- Platforms: 3
- Tracks: 6

Other information
- Station code: 87286302

History
- Opened: 1 September 1848

Passengers
- 2024: 1,974,422
Services
Preceding station	TER Hauts-de-France	Following station
Cassel towards Dunkerque	Krono K52	Isbergues towards Arras
Cassel towards Dunkerque	Krono K70	Bailleul towards Lille-Flandres
Saint-Omer towards Calais	Krono K71	Bailleul towards Lille-Flandres
Terminus	Citi C70	Strazeele towards Lille-Flandres
Terminus	Proxi P52	Steenbecque towards Arras
Ebblinghem towards Calais	Proxi P54	Isbergues towards Arras
Location

Hazebrouck station (French: Gare d'Hazelbrouck) is a railway station serving the town of Hazebrouck, Nord department, northern France. This part of French Flanders is near West Flanders in Belgium.

== Services ==
Hazebrouck station is the junction of the Lille to Fontinettes (Calais) railway and the Arras–Dunkirk railway. The station is served by regional trains to Calais, Dunkirk, Arras and Lille.

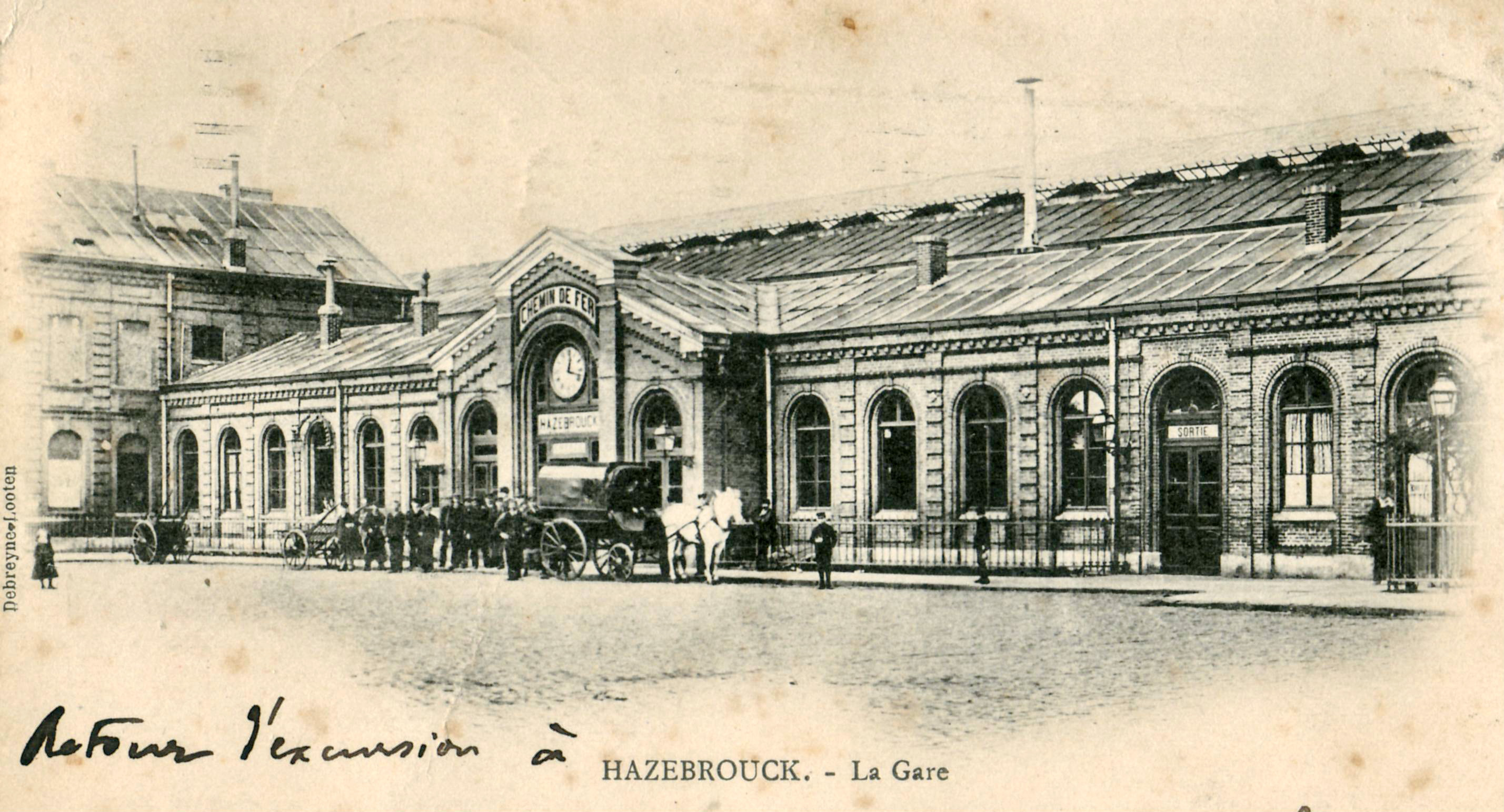
The station; a Debreyne-Looten postcard

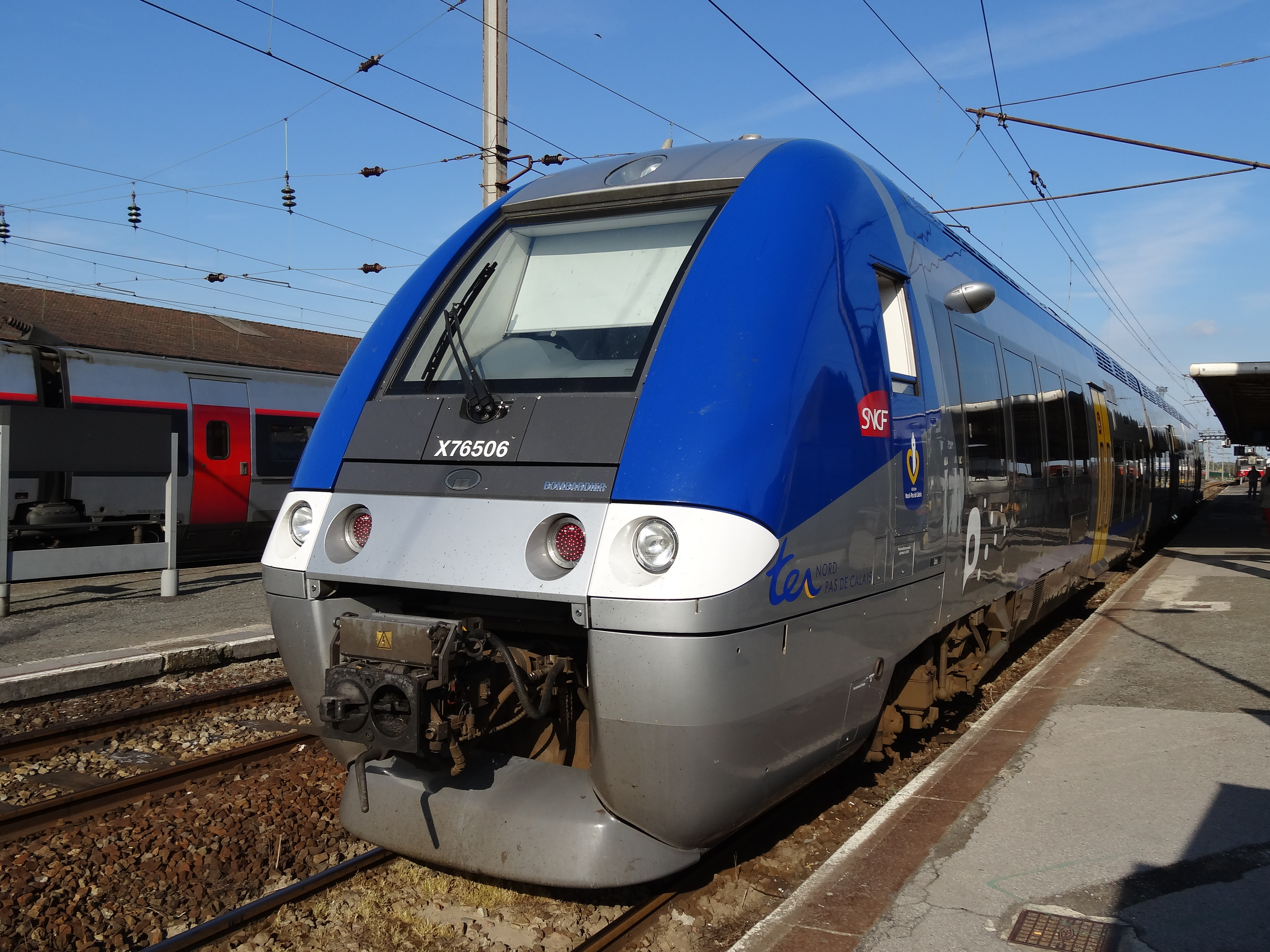
TER waiting at Hazebrouck station

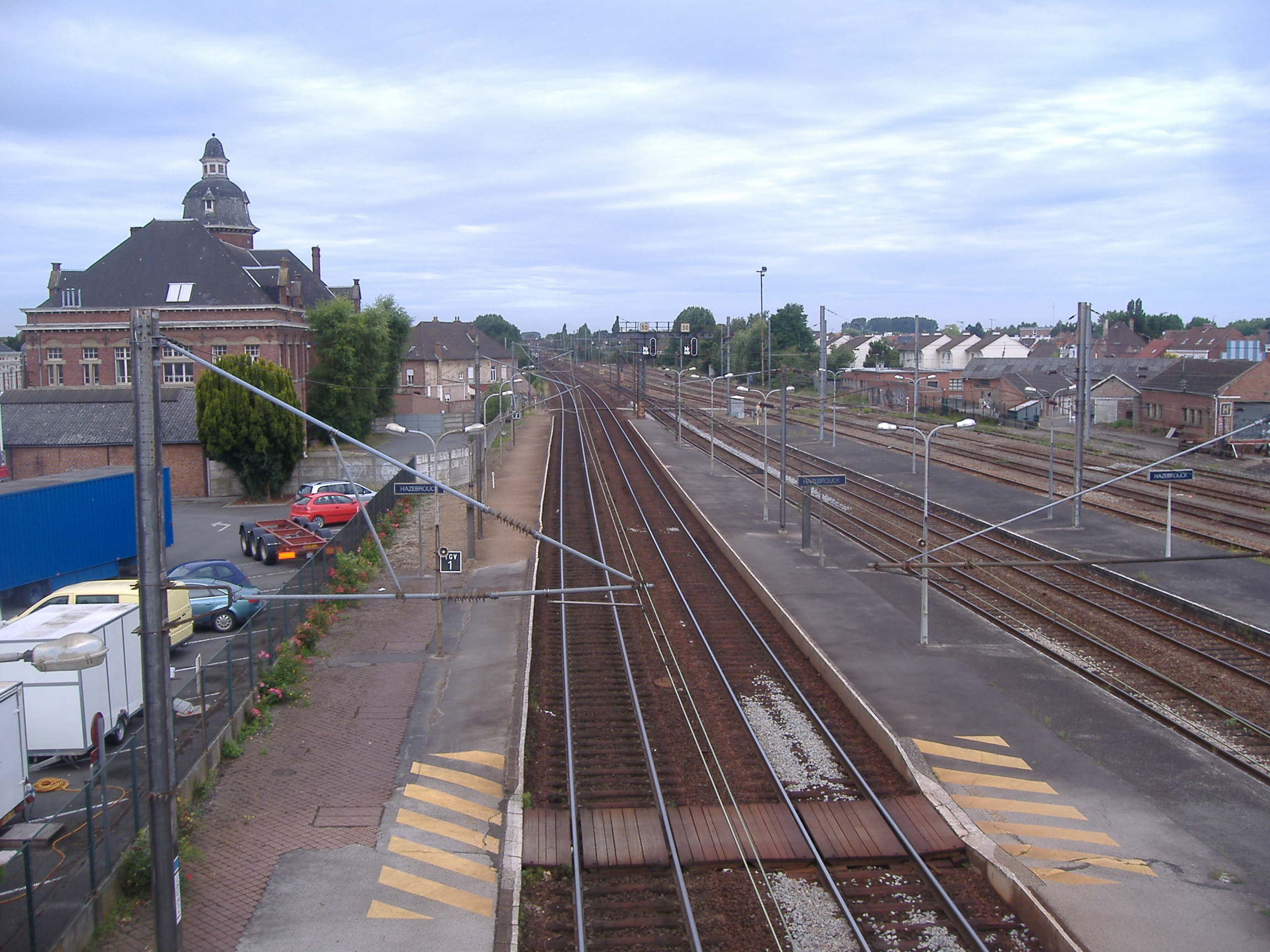
Hazebrouck station, looking west from the bridge

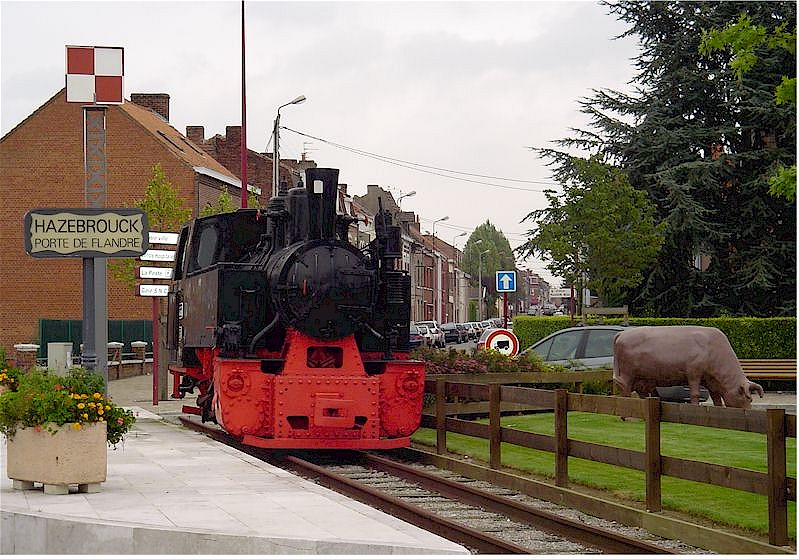
Historic locomotive at Hazebrouck station
