= Lille-Flandres station =

Railway station in Lille, France

Lille Flandres
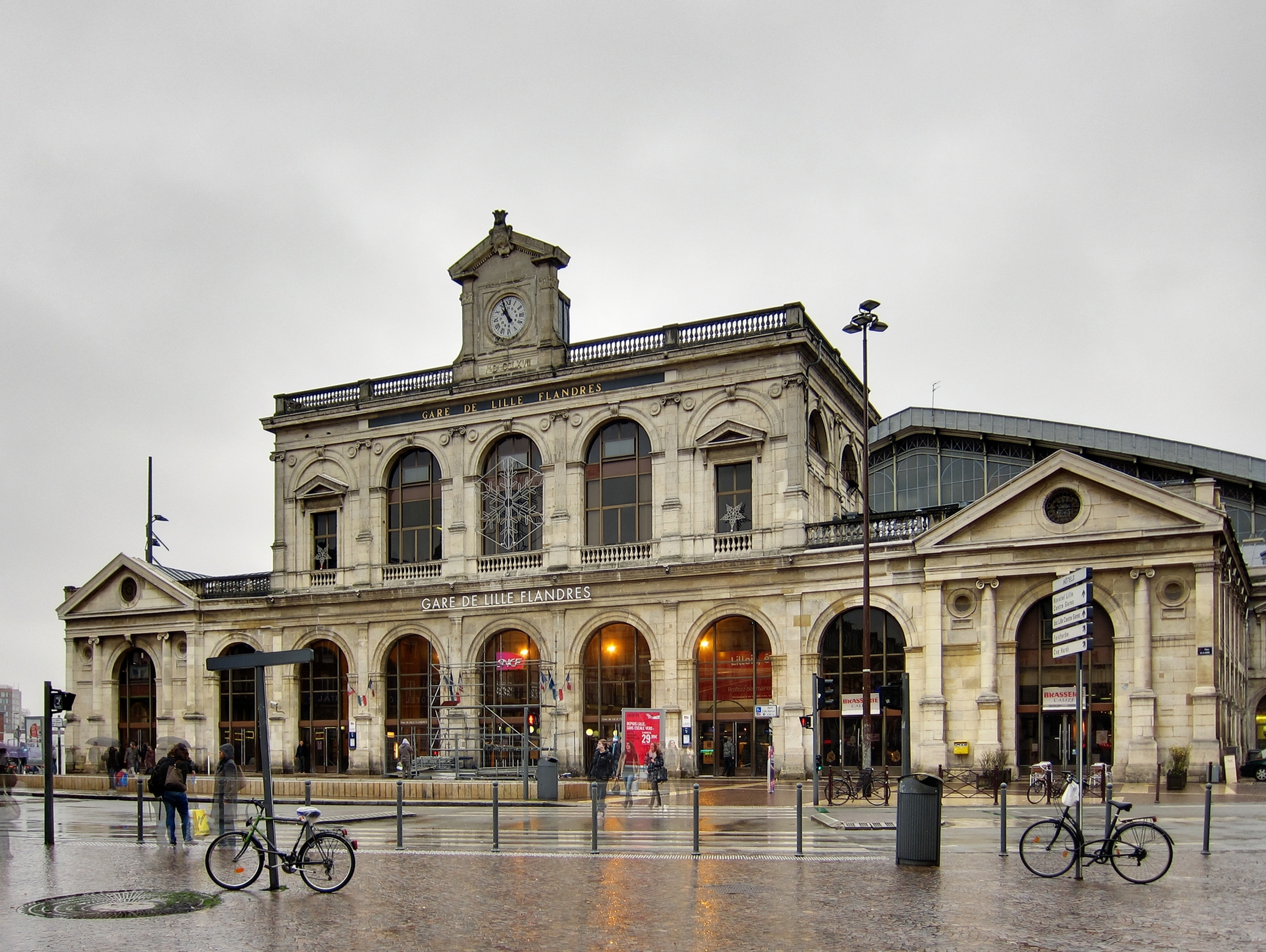
- The exterior of Gare de Lille Flandres

General information
- Location: Place des Buisses; 59000 Lille; Nord, France
- Coordinates: 50°38′11″N 3°4′15″E
- Line: Paris–Lille railway
- Platforms: 9
- Tracks: 17

Other information
- Station code: 87286005

History
- Opened: 1842

Passengers
- 2024: 25,331,979
Services
Preceding station	SNCF	Following station
Paris-Nord Terminus	TGV	Croix-Wasquehal towards Tourcoing
Aéroport Charles de Gaulle towards Quimper	TGV inOui (Seasonal: summer)	Terminus
Preceding station	Ouigo	Following station
Terminus	Ouigo	TGV Haute-Picardie towards Marseille
Preceding station	TER Hauts-de-France	Following station
Douai towards Paris-Nord	Krono K12	Terminus
Terminus	Krono K40	Douai towards Saint-Quentin
Terminus	Krono K45	Douai towards Rouen-RD
Lille-CHR towards Saint-Pol-sur-Ternoise	Krono K50	Terminus
Lille-CHR towards Lens	Krono K51	Terminus
Terminus	Krono K60	Orchies towards Jeumont
Terminus	Krono K61	Orchies towards Charleville-Mézières
Armentières towards Dunkerque	Krono K70	Terminus
Armentières towards Calais	Krono K71	Terminus
Terminus	Krono K80	Roubaix towards Kortrijk
Terminus	Citi C40	Ronchin towards Douai
Terminus	Citi C41	Seclin towards Lens
Lille-Porte-de-Douai towards Béthune	Citi C50	Terminus
Lille-Porte-de-Douai towards Lens	Citi C51	Terminus
Terminus	Citi C60	Mont-de-Terre towards Valenciennes
La Madeleine towards Hazebrouck	Citi C70	Terminus
Terminus	Proxi P80	Croix-Wasquehal towards Tourcoing
Terminus	Proxi P81	Lezennes towards Tournai
Location

Lille-Flandres station (French: Gare de Lille-Flandres, Dutch: Station Lille-Flandres) is the main railway station of Lille, capital of French Flanders. It is a terminus for SNCF Intercity and regional trains. It opened in 1842 as the Gare de Lille, but was renamed in 1993 when Lille Europe station opened. There is a 500 metres (1,600 ft) walking distance between the two stations, which are also adjacent stops on one of the lines of the Lille Metro.

== Construction ==
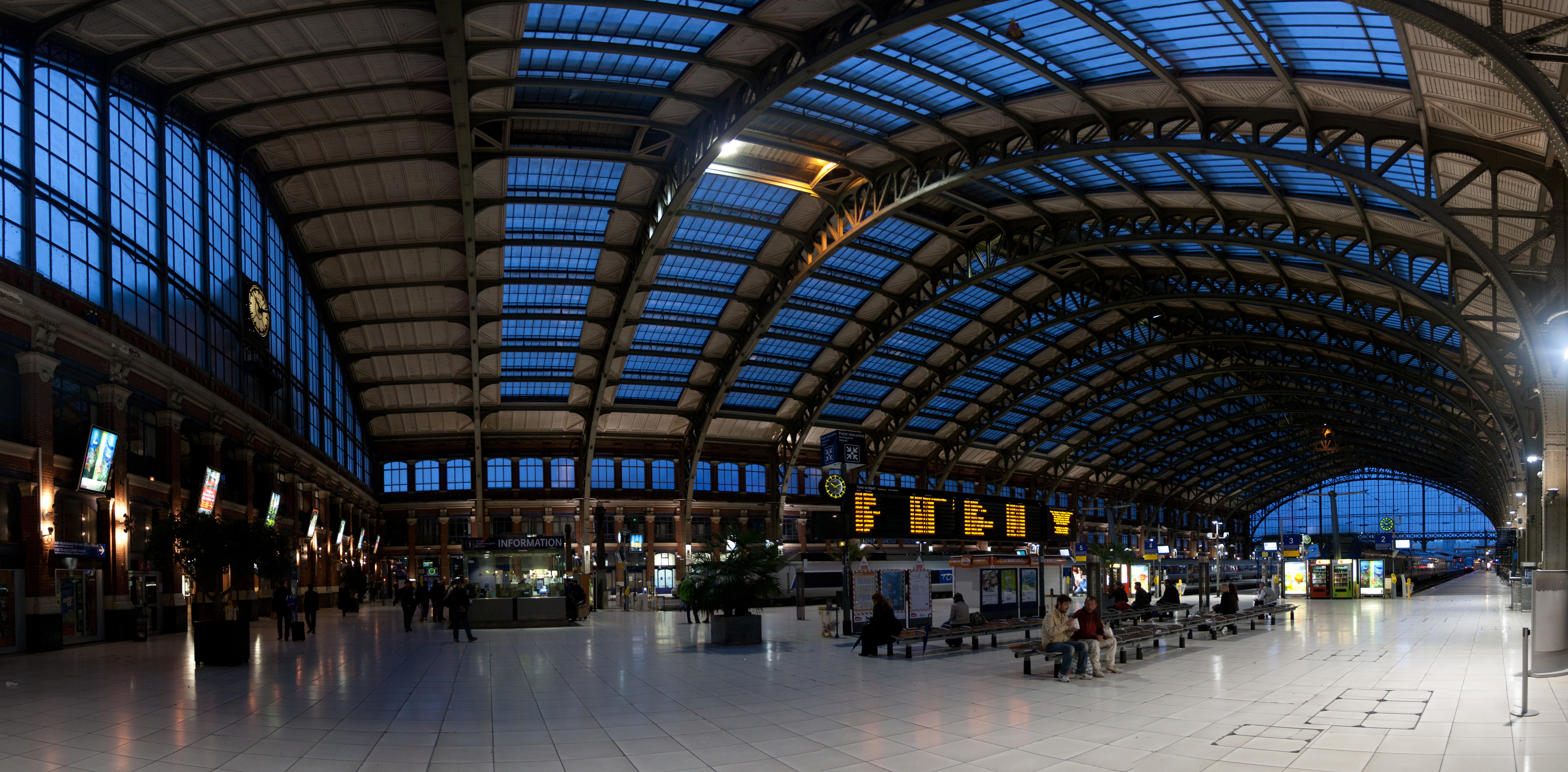
The station concourse

The station was built by Léonce Reynaud and Sydney Dunnett for the CF du Nord. Construction began in 1869 and ended in 1892. The station front is the old front from Paris' Gare du Nord and was dismantled then reassembled in Lille at the end of the 19th century; an extra storey, as well as a large clock, were added to the original design. Dunnett added the Hôtel des Voyageurs in 1887, and the rooftop in 1892.

== Services ==
The station is served by the following services:

- High speed services (TGV) Paris - Lille
- High speed services (TGV) Paris - Lille - Tourcoing
- Intercity services (NMBS/SNCB) Antwerp - Ghent - Kortrijk - Mouscron - Lille
- Intercity services (NMBS/SNCB) Tournai - Lille
- Regional services (TER Hauts-de-France) Lille - Douai - Arras - Paris
- Regional services (TER Hauts-de-France) Lille - Douai - Cambrai - St-Quentin
- Regional services (TER Hauts-de-France) Lille - Douai - Arras - Amiens - Rouen
- Regional services (TER Hauts-de-France) Lille - Béthune - Saint-Pol-sur-Ternoise
- Regional services (TER Hauts-de-France) Lille - Lens
- Regional services (TER Hauts-de-France) Lille - Valenciennes - Maubeuge - Jeumont
- Regional services (TER Hauts-de-France) Lille - Valenciennes - Charleville-Mézières
- Regional services (TER Hauts-de-France) Lille - Hazebrouck - Dunkerque
- Regional services (TER Hauts-de-France) Lille - Hazebrouck - Calais
- Local services (TER Hauts-de-France) Lille - Tournai

=== SNCB/NMBS ===
SNCB/NMBS Belgian Railways trains also run from here to: Courtrai/Kortrijk for example on Belgian railway line 75.

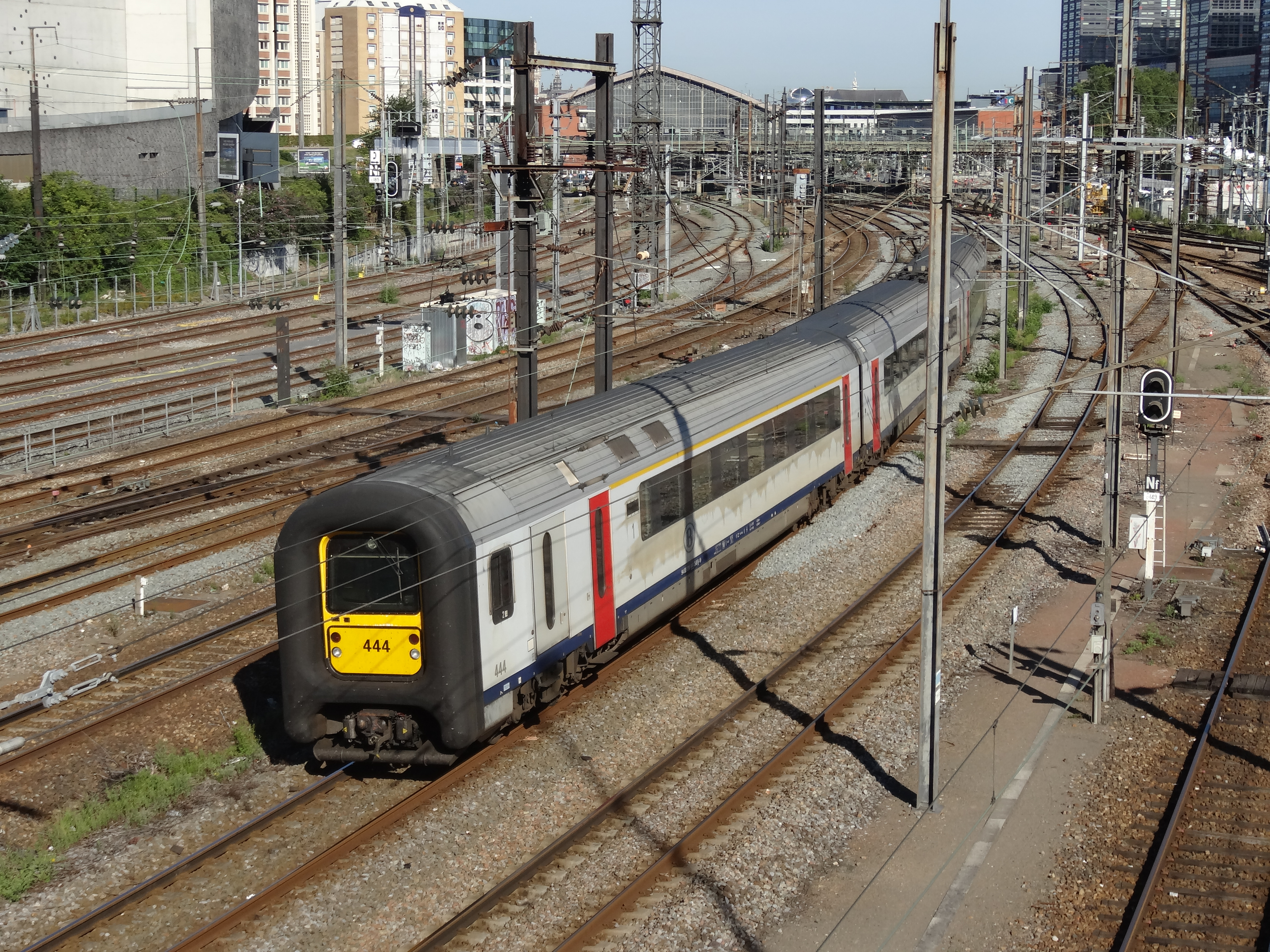
NMBS/SNCB train approaching Lille Flandres.

== See also ==
- Lille-Europe station
- Euralille
