= Dunkirk station =

French railway station

Coordinates: 51°1′50″N 2°22′7″E

Dunkerque
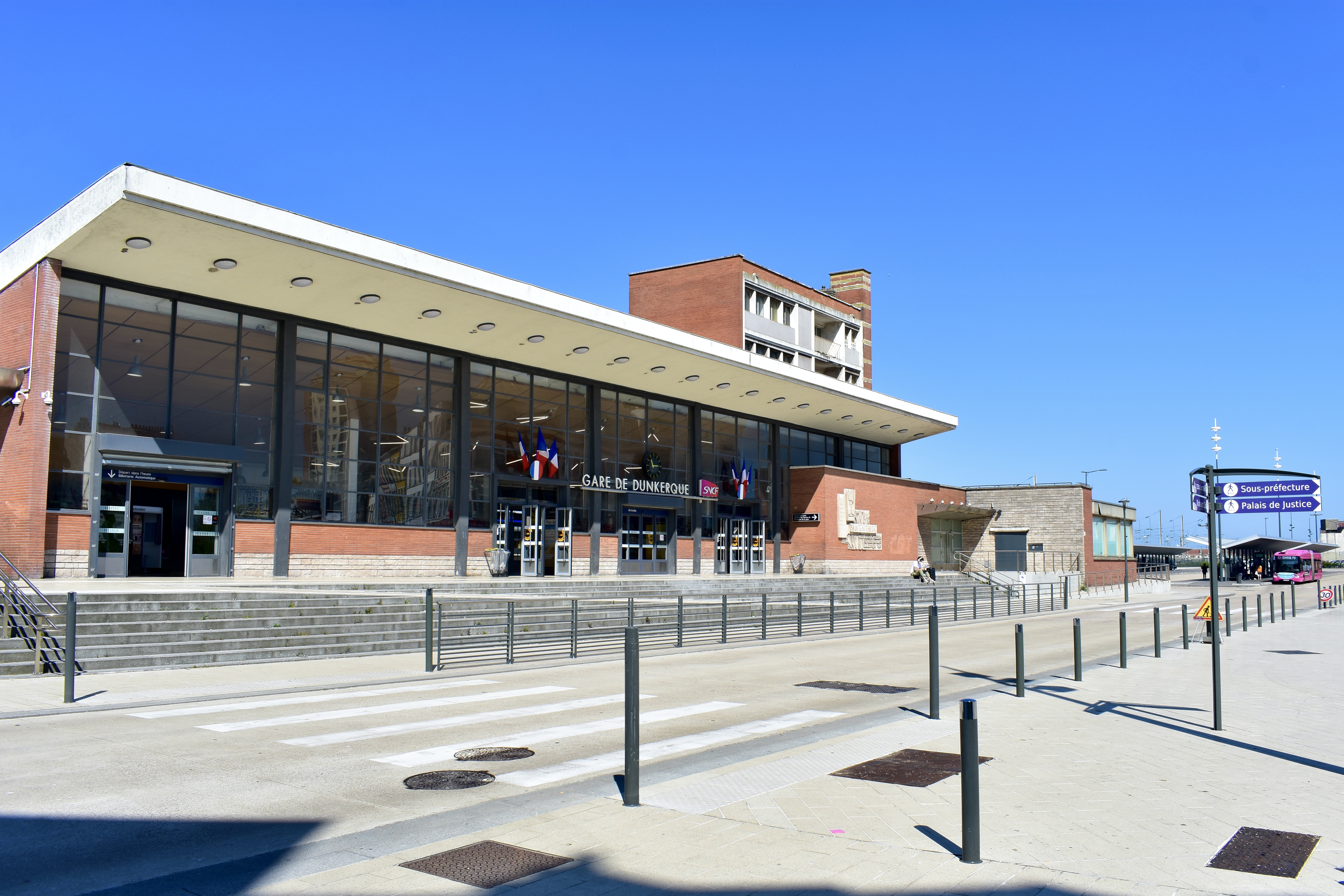
- Passenger building and entrance in 2021.

General information
- Location: Place de la Gare; 59140 Dunkirk; France
- Elevation: 6 m (20 ft)
- Owner: SNCF
- Operator: SNCF
- Platforms: 4
- Tracks: 7

Other information
- Station code: 87281006

Passengers
- 2024: 2,249,345
Services
Preceding station	SNCF	Following station
Terminus	TGV inOui	Hazebrouck towards Paris-Nord
Terminus	TGV inOui	Lille-Europe towards Paris-Nord
Preceding station	TER Hauts-de-France	Following station
Lille-Europe towards Amiens	Krono+ GV K90+	Terminus
Terminus	Krono K52	Coudekerque-Branche towards Arras
Terminus	Krono K70	Coudekerque-Branche towards Lille-Flandres
Coudekerque-Branche towards Calais	Proxi P72	Terminus
Location

Dunkirk station (French: Gare de Dunkerque) is a railway station serving the town Dunkirk, Nord department, northern France. This part of French Flanders is near West Flanders in Belgium.

== Services ==
The station is served by high speed trains to Lille and Paris, and by regional trains to Calais, Arras, Amiens and Lille.

== Belgian Border ==
D'K bus *fr run buses over the Belgian border to Adinkerke connecting with Belgian railways NMBS and in De Panne with the Kusttram.

The railway line across the border is currently out of use.
