= Lille-Europe station =

Railway station in Lille, France

Coordinates: 50°38′22″N 3°04′31″E

Lille–Europe
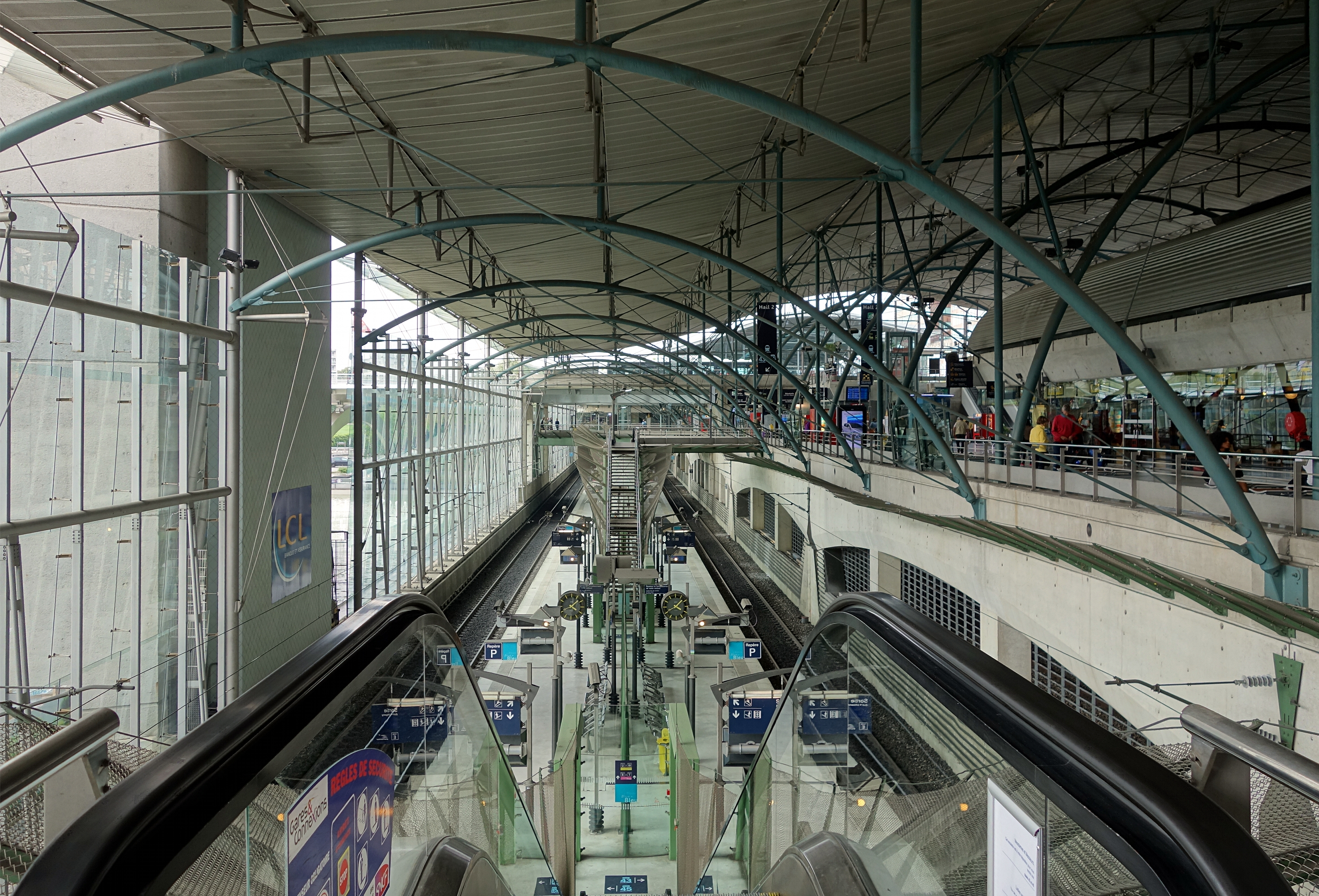
- Lille Europe railway station

General information
- Location: Lille, Hauts-de-France; France
- Lines: TGV; Eurostar; Thalys
- Platforms: 4
- Tracks: 6

Construction
- Architect: Jean-Marie Duthilleul

Other information
- Station code: 87223263; IATA: XDB

History
- Opened: 1994

Passengers
- 2024: 6,642,464
Services
Preceding station	Eurostar	Following station
London Terminus	Eurostar	Brussels-South towards Amsterdam Centraal
London Terminus	Eurostar	Paris-Nord Terminus
Preceding station	SNCF	Following station
Terminus	TGV	TGV Haute-Picardie towards Bordeaux
Terminus	TGV	TGV Haute-Picardie towards Rennes
Terminus	TGV	TGV Haute-Picardie towards Nantes
Terminus	TGV	TGV Haute-Picardie towards Marseille
Terminus	TGV	TGV Haute-Picardie towards Montpellier
Terminus	TGV	Aéroport Charles de Gaulle towards Mulhouse-Ville
Brussels-South Terminus	TGV	Aéroport Charles de Gaulle towards Nice-Ville
Brussels-South Terminus	TGV	Aéroport Charles de Gaulle towards Perpignan
Calais-Fréthun towards Calais-Ville	TGV inOui	Paris-Nord Terminus
Calais-Fréthun towards Boulogne-Ville or Rang-du-Fliers	TGV inOui	Paris-Nord Terminus
Dunkerque Terminus	TGV inOui	Paris-Nord Terminus
Terminus	TGV inOui (Summer only)	Aéroport Charles de Gaulle towards Bourg-Saint-Maurice
Preceding station	TER Hauts-de-France	Following station
Arras towards Amiens	Krono+ GV K90+	Dunkerque Terminus
Arras towards Amiens	Krono+ GV K92+	Calais-Fréthun Terminus
Arras towards Amiens	Krono+ GV K94+	Calais-Fréthun towards Rang-du-Fliers
Location

Lille–Europe station (French: Gare de Lille-Europe) is a SNCF railway station in Lille, France, on the LGV Nord high-speed railway. The station is primarily used for international Eurostar and long-distance SNCF TGV services, although some high-speed regional trains also call at the station. The station was built in 1993 to be used as a through station for trains between the UK, Belgium, and the Netherlands, as well as French TGV services, except those coming from Paris, which normally terminate at Lille-Flandres station. There is a 400-metre (1,300 ft) walking distance between the two stations, which are also connected by the Lille Metro and Lille tramway.

Lille-Europe has 2 Island platforms serving 4 tracks, plus 2 gated through tracks for non-stopping trains in the middle of the station. The Main concourse is situated above the bypass.

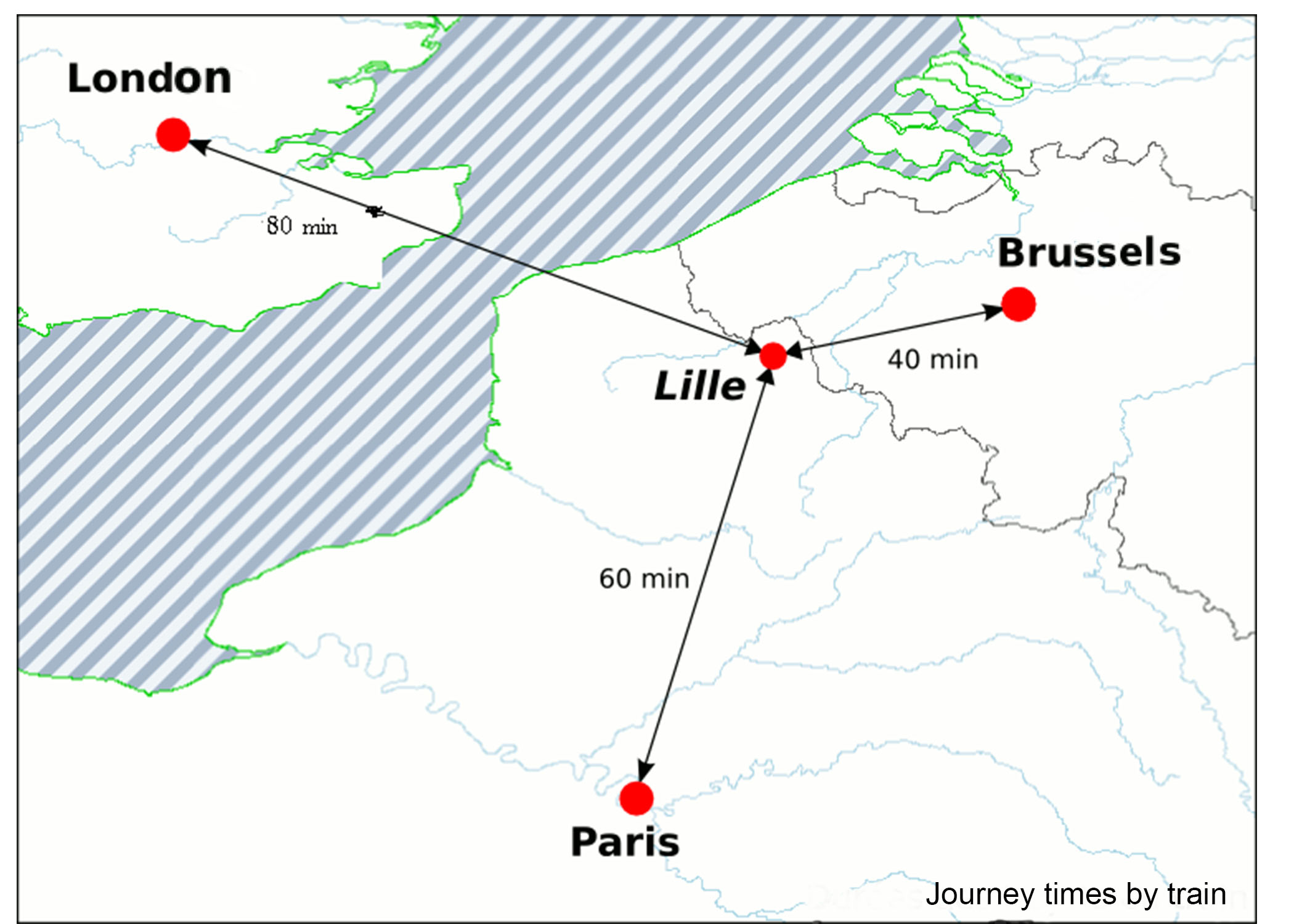
Trains between the three capitals of London, Brussels, and Paris pass through Lille

== Connections ==
For travellers from the United Kingdom to destinations not served directly by Eurostar, connections are available here on trains towards Disneyland Paris, Charles de Gaulle International Airport, Lyon, Valence, then Avignon, Aix-en-Provence, Marseille St. Charles (and also on to Cannes and Nice); and Nîmes, Montpellier and Perpignan.

After the 'Additional Protocol to the Sangatte Protocol' was signed by France and the United Kingdom on 29 May 2000, juxtaposed controls were set up in the station. Eurostar passengers travelling to the UK clear exit checks from the Schengen Area (carried out by the French Border Police and French Customs) as well as UK entry checks (conducted by the UK Border Force) in the station before boarding their train.

== Train services ==
The following services call at Lille:

- International high-speed services (Eurostar Blue) London – Lille – Brussels – Amsterdam
- International high-speed services (Eurostar Blue) London – Lille – Paris
- High-speed services (TGV) Calais – Lille – Paris
- High-speed services (TGV) (Rang-du-Fliers -) Boulogne – Calais – Lille – Paris
- High-speed services (TGV) Dunkerque – Lille – Paris
- High-speed services (TGV) Lille – Aéroport CDG – Lyon – Marseille
- High-speed services (TGV) Lille – Aéroport CDG – Lyon – Nîmes – Montpellier
- High-speed services (TGV) Lille – Aéroport CDG – Tours – Poitiers – Bordeaux
- High-speed services (TGV) Lille – Aéroport CDG – Le Mans – Rennes
- High-speed services (TGV) Lille – Aéroport CDG – Le Mans – Angers – Nantes
- High-speed services (TGV) Lille – Arras – Aéroport CDG – Lyon – Nîmes – Montpellier
- High-speed services (TGV) Lille – Arras – Aéroport CDG – Lyon – Marseille
- International high-speed services (TGV) Brussels – Lille – Aéroport CDG – Lyon – Marseille
- International high-speed services (TGV) Brussels – Lille – Aéroport CDG – Lyon – Nîmes – Montpellier – Perpignan
- High-speed regional services (TER GV) Dunkirk – Lille
- High-speed regional services (TER GV) Rang-du-Fliers – Boulogne – Calais – Lille

== Ouibus ==
Since 23 July 2012, SNCF's international coach network, iDBUS (now BlaBlaBus), serves Lille Europe.

Coach services from Lille are:

- Paris – Lille
- Paris – Lille – Brussels
- Paris – Lille – Amsterdam
- Paris – Lille – London

== See also ==
- Lille-Flandres station
