= 76th Brigade, Royal Field Artillery =

Artillery unit of the British Army in World War I

- Royal Artillery cap badge
- Active: 11 September 1914–August 1919
- Country: United Kingdom
- Branch: Kitchener's Army
- Role: Field artillery
- Size: 4 Batteries
- Part of: Guards Division; Second Army; XIV Corps; VI Corps
- Engagements: Battle of Loos; Battle of the Somme; Battle of Vimy Ridge; Battle of Messines; Third Battle of Ypres; Italian Campaign; Hundred Days Offensive

Alfred Leete's recruitment poster for Kitchener's Army.

LXXVI Brigade (76th Brigade) (Note: 'Brigade' was the Royal Artillery term for a lieutenant-colonel's command comprising a number of batteries 'brigaded' together; it was the equivalent of an infantry battalion or cavalry regiment.) was a Royal Field Artillery (RFA) unit raised as part of 'Kitchener's Army' during World War I. Initially recruited in Ireland, it served on the Western Front as part of Guards Division and saw action at the Battle of Loos and on the Somme. At the beginning of 1917 it became an independent 'Army Field Artillery' brigade, supporting various formations at the battles of Vimy Ridge, Messines and Ypres. It served in Italy during the winter of 1917–18, then returned to the Western Front for the Allies' victorious Hundred Days Offensive, forming part of the advance guard in the pursuit. After the Armistice with Germany the brigade served in the Allied occupation of the Rhineland.

== Mobilisation and training ==
On 6 August 1914, less than 48 hours after Britain's declaration of war, Parliament sanctioned an increase of 500,000 men for the Regular British Army, and the newly appointed Secretary of State for War, Earl Kitchener of Khartoum issued his famous call to arms: 'Your King and Country Need You', urging the first 100,000 volunteers to come forward. This group of six divisions with supporting arms became known as Kitchener's First New Army, or 'K1'. Recruitment was rapid and the 'K2' units followed shortly after, including 16th (Irish) Division. The divisional artillery for this formation (16th (I) DA) was quickly raised at Cahir, Fermoy and Kilkenny in September 1914, though there was a shortage of Irish recruits and many of the gunners were from England. The divisional artillery comprised four Royal Field Artillery (RFA) brigades numbered LXXIV–LXXVII (74–77).

A Reserve officer, Colonel Russell Gubbins, was appointed to command LXXVI Brigade. On the outbreak of war Gubbins had been recalled from the reserve and promoted to Temporary Brigadier-General as a staff officer at the War Office. However, he reverted to the rank of colonel on 21 November and took command of the new brigade in Ireland.

LXXVI Brigade was to have consisted of 238, 239, 240 Batteries, each equipped with six 18-pounder guns, and LXXVI Brigade Ammunition Column (BAC). But on 23 January 1915 the numbered batteries were reorganised as four four-gun batteries, lettered A, B, C, D. The training of 16th (I) Division progressed slowly, and to begin with the artillery 'had neither guns, dial sights, directors, nor harness for the horses'. It was some months before the batteries were able to obtain even 15 horses each, let alone guns. They began crossing from Ireland to England in July to complete their training at the Larkhill ranges on Salisbury Plain. However, the rest of the division was still delayed, and in late August it was decided to send most of 16th (I) DA to France to become the divisional artillery for a new Guards Division that was being assembled within the British Expeditionary Force (BEF). (Guards Divisional Artillery often referred to itself as the GDA.)

== Western Front ==
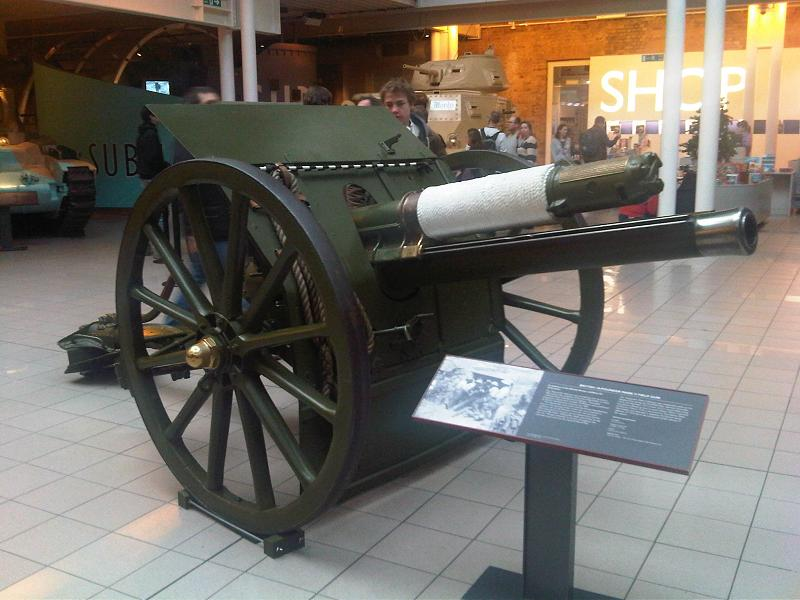
18-pounder gun preserved at the Imperial War Museum.

LXXVI Brigade left Rollestone Camp on 2 September, and entrained at Amesbury railway station for Southampton Docks where it embarked and sailed that evening. It disembarked at Le Havre next morning and began entraining to join the divisional concentration around Lumbres (near Saint-Omer), where the men were billeted in Ouve-Wirquin. The whole brigade had arrived by 6 September.

Most of the infantry units of Guards Division had been serving on the Western Front since the beginning of the war, but some battalions were newly arrived from England and the division was undergoing training to integrate these. None of the artillery units had any experience, and thus soon after arrival they were sent up in turn to First Army's area for a weeks's introduction to front line duties. LXXVI Brigade moved up on 9 September and its sections relieved alternate sections of XIII Bde (Meerut Division) and LXIV Bde (12th (Eastern) Division) in the line. Over the week they fired registration shots and other routine duties before being called back to Ouve-Wirquin on 15 September. On 19 September Guards Division received its orders to take over a sector of the front line south of Aire. While preparations were under way, LXXVI Bde carried out a field exercise at Wizernes with 3rd Guards Brigade on 21 September.

=== Loos ===
Guards Division's first operation was to be in the BEF's forthcoming offensive (the Battle of Loos). Together with two newly arrived 'Kitchener' divisions, 21st and 24th, the division was assigned to the general reserve. It took up its positions, some 6 miles (9.7 km) behind the lines by series of secret night marches, ready to move up and continue the operation. The attack was launched on 25 September and the GDA began its approach march next day, taking over the infantry's bivouacs at Nœux-les-Mines. After struggling along roads choked by 21st and 24th Division's columns, Guards Division launched its own attack on 27 September. LXXVI Brigade supporting 3rd Guards Bde took up positions near 'Quality Street' and engaged targets between the 'Chalk Pits' and Hill 70. In the afternoon the battery commanders established their observation posts (OPs) in the prominent pit-head winding gear known as the 'Pylon'. The division's attack was a partial success, 3rd Gds Bde digging in on the nearer slope of Hill 70. The division renewed its attack on the pits on 28 September, the artillery putting down a hurricane bombardment on the objective just before zero, but without success. Next day LXXVI Bde came temporarily under 21st DA. Guards Division consolidated its position before being relieved on 30 September.

While Guards Division's infantry rested, the guns remained in position around Quality Street, digging in and registering various targets. The Guards infantry came back into the line for a proposed attack on 3–4 October, for which a 3-day preliminary bombardment was planned, but the enemy recaptured the Hohenzollern Redoubt and the infantry were rushed north to deal with this, while the GDA remained in place covering the troops of 12th (E) Division. LXXVI Brigade HQ moved to the village of Philosophe near Vermelles on 7 October. Next day the guns fired barrages on pre-arranged targets around the Puits and Hill 70 against enemy attacks developing against 12th (E) Division. C Battery's gunners had to wear their 'smoke helmets' because of the gas employed by the attackers.These attacks had been halted by nightfall. On 12 October the enemy shelled the brigade's positions, the gun pits of B and D Btys taking hits, with damage to guns and waggons; the two batteries shifted to new gun pits next day. LXXVI Brigade does not appear to have participated in the bombardment for the resumption of the offensive on 13 October, but it was back in action on the night of 14/15 October firing defensive barrages. On 17 October C Bty caught an enemy working party in the open and dispersed them. On 19 October the brigade began withdrawing by sections to new positions a little further north to support Guards Division, which was holding the line after the bitter Action of the Hohenzollern Redoubt. Brigade HQ moved to Annequin; A Bty was designated for counter-battery (CB) fire under the command of a Royal Garrison Artillery Siege Group; B Bty was placed in an enfilading position at Vermelles. By 21 October all the guns had repositioned and telephone lines had been laid to the forward observation officers (FOOs) with the infantry battalions in the front line, and next day they began registering the batteries onto new targets. Guards Division was relieved to rest billets at the end of the month, LXXVI Bde moving to Labourse and then Gosnay.

Guards Division's commander, the Earl of Cavan, was conscious of the inexperience of his artillery and wanted the best officers to command it. The division's Commander, Royal Artillery (CRA), had already been changed, and now Col Gubbins was replaced in command of LXXVI Bde. A Royal Horse Artillery (RHA) officer, Major G.R.V. Kinsman, DSO, took over on 3 November and was later promoted to Lieutenant-Colonel.

On 8 November Guards Division began relieving the Lahore Division north of the La Bassée Canal and LXXVI Bde moved to billets at Le Sart near Merville. On 11–12 November Brigade HQ was established at Pont-du-Hem south of Laventie and the batteries moved into position, with Maj Kinsman commanding the Right Group of the GDA. The guns began registering their assigned targets, and on 19 November D Bty engaged an enemy snipers' post with 20 rounds of the new high explosive (HE) shells, silencing it. The trenches in this area were flooded and the division had to repair crumbling breastworks and communications. The divisional defence scheme involved defended localities rather than continuous lines, backed by a strong counter-attack force. Guards DA was to support the counter-attacks with all available guns, but in case of German breakthrough the batteries were to withdraw to prepared positions in the rear, leaving four single guns for close support. In the event the Germans made no serious attack, and they confined themselves to intermittent artillery bombardments and mining. Lord Cavan ordered the DA to reserve its fire for prompt and heavy retaliation, or for special targets. For example, C/LXXVI Bty took part in bombarding an enemy-held mine crater on 23 November, and next day D/LXXVI Bty was involved in a bombardment that damaged a German blockhouse and blew a wide gap in the enemy breastworks and barbed wire at Sign Post Lane with HE. The gap was then sprayed with machine gun fire and occasional Shrapnel shells throughout the night to prevent repair. The artillery kept certain lanes clear through the enemy wire so that patrols and raiding parties could come and go, and provided supporting fire for these raids. Later in the month the GDA's groups were rearranged, Right Group under Maj Kinsman and LXXVI Bde HQ consisting of C/LXI (Howitzer) Bty, B/LXXIV Bty, A & B/LXXV Btys and C/LXXVI Bty; Bde HQ moved to Levantie. On 11 December B/LXXVI Bty in Left Group fired a 'circular' barrage to protect an infantry raid on Sign Post Lane. Enemy working parties and anti-aircraft batteries were also targeted. The routine of trench warfare and minor operations continued throughout the winter, the crews sometimes being flooded out of their gun pits.

=== Ypres Salient ===
Guards Division was posted to a new XIV Corps in Second Army and on 14 February 1916 began moving north to join it in the Ypres Salient. The division was not immediately required in the front line, and spent several weeks in corps reserve, at rest and training. LXXVI Brigade was at Zegerscappel. On 14 March orders arrived for Guards Division to take over the front line from Bellewaarde Stream to Wieltje Farm. LXXVI Brigade took up positions at Riegersburg in the northern outskirts of Ypres, with HQ and the men's billets at Poperinge. Lieutenant-Col Kinsman once again commanded Right Group, which later established its HQ on the Ypres Ramparts. The guns were positioned and began registering on 19 March. Both side's artillery was very active around the Salient. The batteries expended great efforts in fortifying their gun positions and OPs against frequent enemy CB fire, which caused some damage. The batteries' usual targets were enemy working parties, suspected HQs and OPs, or retaliatory fire on their trenches. Batteries would also assign single guns to 'snipe' enemy crossroads and railway crossings. Because the DA's fire had little effect in keeping down enemy fire, a special bombardment was carried out on 4 April by the corps heavy artillery, with LXXVI Bde joining with shrapnel fire on enemy communication trenches, billets etc. This bombardment should have gone on all day, but bad weather reduced visibility, so it was resumed on 5 April, causing considerable damage to the enemy first and second defence systems. Thereafter, German artillery fire remained persistent, but was less concentrated. On 23 April LXXVI Bde HQ withdrew to the waggon lines at Houtkerque, leaving the batteries under the command of LXXIV Bde in Right Group. Early in May Lt-Col Kinsman left on sick leave and was replaced by Lt-Col F.C. Bryant, CMG, posted from J Bty RHA.

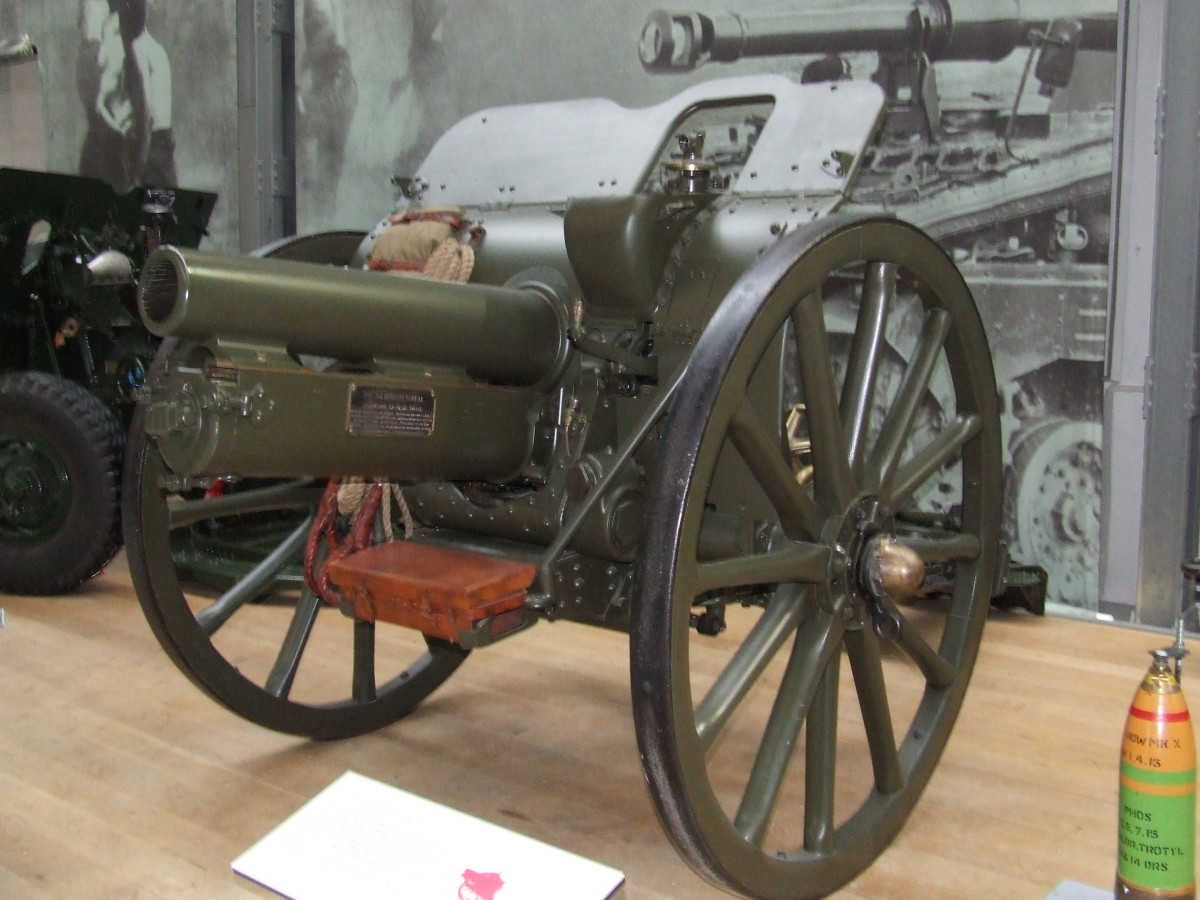
4.5-inch howitzer at the Royal Artillery Museum.

On 15–16 May the field brigades of the GDA were reorganised. LXI (Howitzer) Brigade (Note: LXI (H) Brigade had originally been recruited in Northern England for 11th (Northern) Division before transferring to the GDA in France.) transferred one of its howitzer batteries to each of the 18-pdr brigades to become D (H) Bty in each and received their 18-pdr D Btys in return. At the same time the BACs were abolished and absorbed into the Divisional Ammunition Column (DAC). At this point LXXVI Bde was organised as follows:

- A, B, C Btys – each 4 x 18-pdrs
- D (ex C/LXI) (H) Bty – 4 x 4.5-inch howitzers

The trench routine continued until 21 May, when the GDA was relieved. The batteries withdrew to the waggon lines at Arnèke and undertook training. On 3 June LXXVI Bde received orders to move to Calais for a course of instruction, but this was cancelled the next day because part of Guards Division was being rushed back to Ypres where a German attack had penetrated the Canadian Corps line at Sanctuary Wood. This fighting continued for some days, during which the brigade remained at Arnèke. Guards DA returned to the line on 18 June, taking over the guns of 6th DA, the battery positions being outside Ypres on the Wieltje road, with LXXVI Bde HQ at Château des Trois Tours. Second Army now adopted a more offensive policy, to divert attention away from the 'Big Push' being prepared on the Somme. On 24 June Left Group of guns covering Guards Division's front (LXXV and LXXVI Bdes commanded by Lt-Col Bryant), bombarded the German line, cutting three gaps in the wire and four breaches in the parapet, after which 3rd Guards Bde carried out a raid and advanced their line by about 200 yards (180 m). Both groups repeated the operation on 27 June and after that the gaps were kept open by systematic shell and machine gun fire, and were used by nightly raiding parties and patrols. On 1 July the 18-pdr batteries cut the wire round a German post at Morteldje Estaminet at the crossroads of 'Admiral's Road' from Wieltje and 'Boundary Road' running north from Ypres, and that night concentrated fire from the 4.5-inch howitzers supported a raid by 1st Battalion, Welsh Guards. The Welsh Guards succeeded in capturing the post but under heavy fire from German artillery and Minenwerfers were forced to evacuate it the following day. Left Group was relieved by 6th DA on 5 July and went back to Proven, but this was reversed two days later, and the batteries returned to wire-cutting, firing on working parties and exchanging retaliatory fire with enemy Minenwerfers.

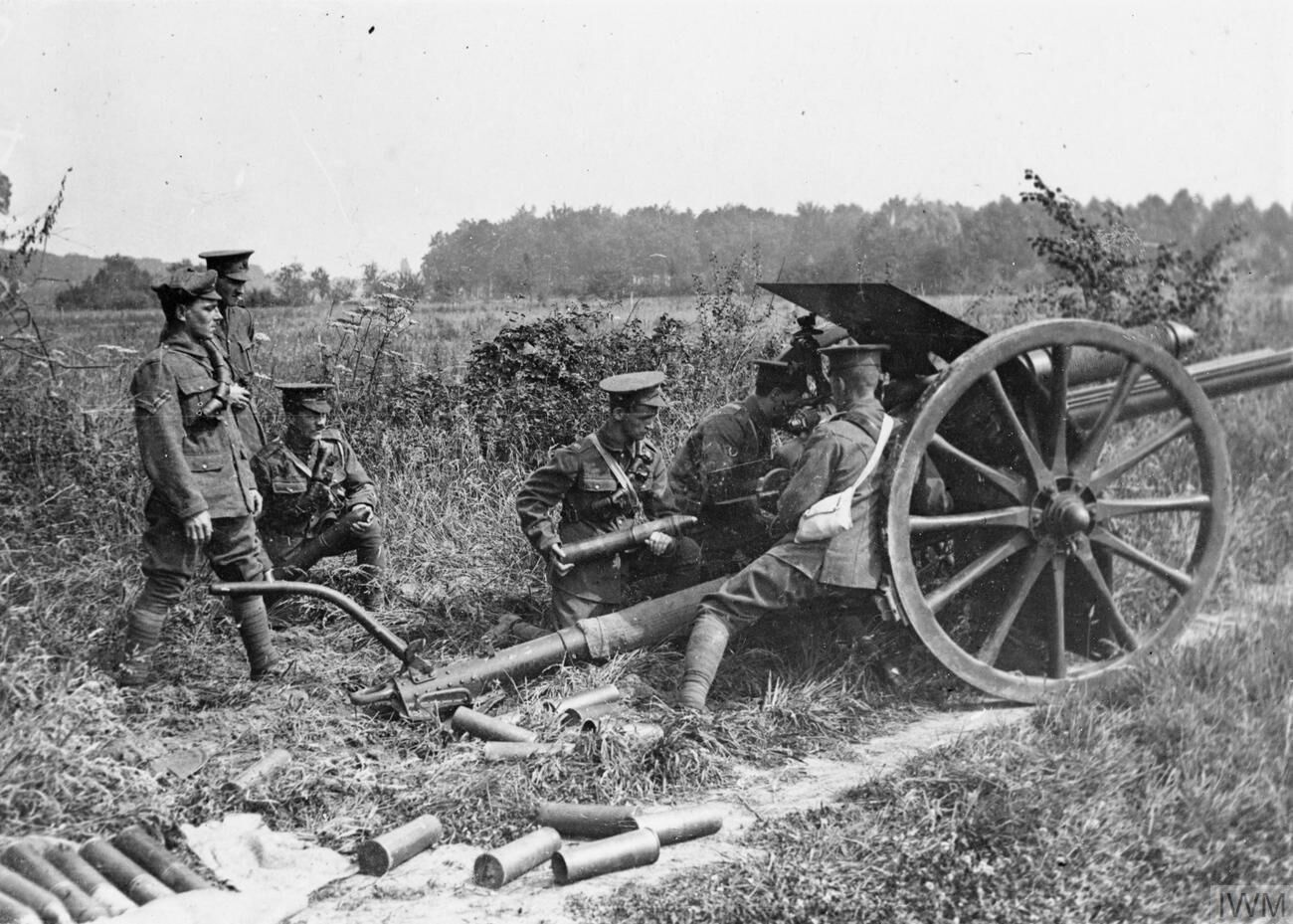
18-pounder in action on the Somme

=== Somme ===
The Somme Offensive opened on 1 July, and XIV Corps was sent to reinforce Reserve Army in this fighting. Guards Division was relieved on 27 July and moved south by train. By 4 August the brigade was billeted at Authie, near Doullens and three days later it took up positions in Centre Group behind Guards Division, with HQ at Courcelles. The division occupied the line opposite Serre and Beaumont-Hamel, where there had been fierce fighting on 1 July but was now a quiet sector while Fourth Army continued the offensive further south. On 19 August Guards Division began moving south to join Fourth Army, but LXXVI Bde did not pull out of the line until 29 August, when it withdrew to billets at Thièvres to overhaul its equipment. On the night of 8/9 September it moved its guns up to positions in Bernafay Wood and Trônes Wood to support 16th (I) Division in a preliminary attack (the Battle of Ginchy). A German shell exploded in a gun pit of C Bty, killing 4 men. The infantry of 16th (I) Division attacked at 16.45, preceded by half the field guns of Guards DA firing a Creeping barrage, the other half firing a standing barrage in front, while the howitzers were used to keep selected areas such as the orchards in Ginchy under fire. The attack was a success, but the guns were kept busy as the Germans launched persistent counter-attacks. Guards Division's infantry relieved 16th (I) Division on the night of 9/10 September in preparation for the forthcoming Battle of Flers–Courcelette.

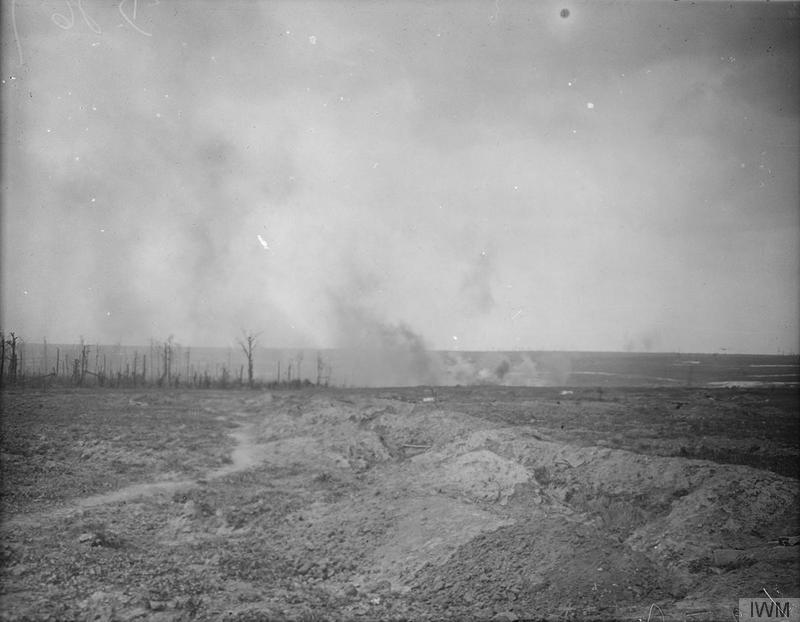
The bombardment of Ginchy, 9 September 1916, photographed from Trônes Wood b y John Warwick Brooke.

The attack was launched on 15 September. The artillery bombardment had begun on 12 September, the field guns mainly employed for wire cutting in daylight and harassing fire at night, and the bombardment suddenly became intense at Zero (06.20). Once again, the infantry advance was preceded by half the field guns firing a creeping barrage while the other half (including LXXVI Bde) fired standing barrages ahead of the advance, which lifted forwards when the creeping barrage reached each barrage line. The howitzers fired on selected targets. LXXVI Brigade was in Left Group under Lt-Col F.A. Buzzard of LXI Bde, supporting 1st Guards Bde, while Lt-Col Bryant acted as the CRA's liaison officer at 1st Gds Bde's HQ. At 11.00 LXXVI Bde ceased firing and moved up to pre-prepared forward positions between Delville Wood and Ginchy, with HQ near Guillemont Station under command of the infantry brigade. It had 12 guns in action by 14.20, and they were turned onto enemy infantry reported to be massing for an attack. Unfortunately the Guards attack had been disrupted by enfilade fire from unsuppressed machine guns on their flanks, and many got lost amongst the featureless shell-churned countryside. Having suffered heavy casualties 1st Guards Bde could not get beyond the 'Brown Line', the second of its four objectives, and with no further advance possible, LXXVI Bde reverted to Left Group's command. The brigade spent the following day establishing OPs and registering targets from its new positions. After the Guards infantry were relieved on the night of 16/17 September, the GDA remained in the line supporting an attack by 20th (Light) Division.

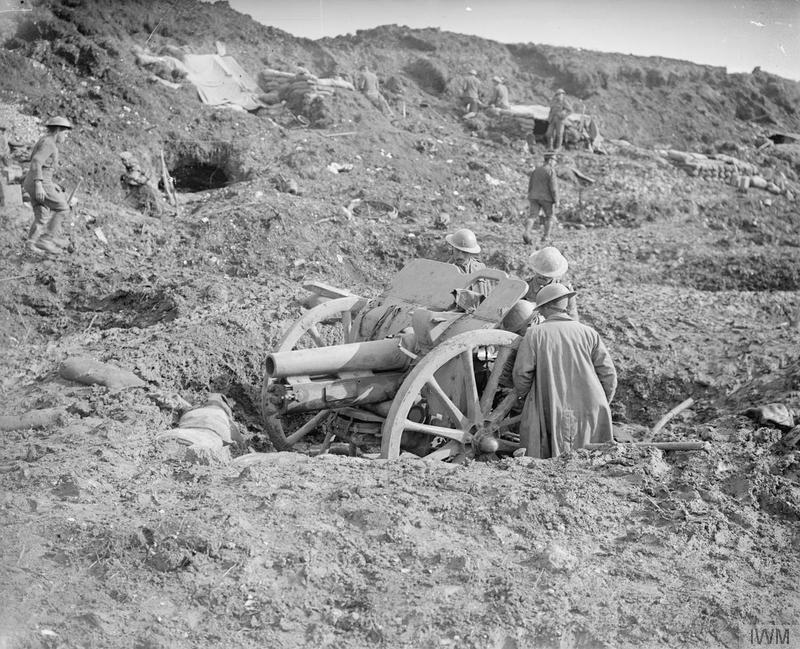
4.5-inch howitzer dug into a shellhole after the Battle of Flers-Courcelette.

From 18 September the brigade was engaged in wire-cutting for the next phase of the offensive, as well as directing irregular bursts of fire where the enemy were suspected of working on their defences. The preparations were delayed by bad weather, but on 22 September LXXVI Bde had the help of an observation aircraft to register roads and tracks behind enemy lines. The Battle of Morval began on 25 September, with the brigade providing a creeping barrage to cover 3rd Guards Bde in its successful Capture of Lesbœufs. That night it carried out night firing on the enemy's new line and the tracks behind it. On 27 September it fired a creeping barrage as 21st Division completed the Capture of Gueudecourt. That night a German aircraft bombed the waggon lines at Carnoy, and LXXVI Bde lost 44 horses killed and 30 badly injured. Guards Division was relieved at the end of September, but the artillery remained in the line for another month, supporting XIV Corps in the Battle of the Transloy Ridges. By 3 October the guns were getting out of range, and they began work on new positions in front of 'Needle Trench', south-east of Gueudecourt, with D (H) Bty in Lesbœufs. The first guns were back in action by 7 October, with the howitzers bombarding 'Bolt Alley' and 'Beam Trench'. On 10/11 October the rest of the guns and Bde HQ moved into Needle Trench. The brigade's 18-pdrs supported minor operations on 14, 18 and 22–24 October, but most of the firing over the month was by the howitzers against 'Eclipse Trench' or 'Zenith Trench', while the 18-pdr gunners worked to improve gun pits, ammunition pits and dugouts. On 31 October the gunners were withdrawn to rest at 'The Citadel', leaving guards on their guns.

== LXXVI Army Field Artillery Brigade ==
On 11 November the brigade withdrew its guns and marched to a camp at Meaulte where the GDA was concentrated. On 14 November the field brigades of the GDA were reorganised into 6-gun batteries: in LXXVI Bde A Bty was split between B and C. After the Somme, General Headquarters (GHQ) had decided that it needed a reserve of field artillery to reinforce parts of the front without breaking up divisional artillery. Each infantry division contributed one of its RFA brigades to become independent Army Field Artillery (AFA) brigades in this reserve. LXXVI therefore became LXXVI AFA Bde on 19 January 1917. D (H) Battery was posted away to be split between D (H)/LXXIV and D (H)/LXXV (completing their 6-gun reorganisation), but LXXVI Bde was joined by B/LXXXI Bty from 17th (Northern) Division stationed at Morlancourt. The new AFA brigade therefore had three batteries and its own reformed BAC:

- A (B + half A) – 6 x 18-pdrs
- B (C + half A) – 6 x 18-pdrs
- C (ex B/LXXXI) – 6 x 18-pdrs
- LXXVI BAC (ex No 3 Section DAC)

The brigade officially left the Guards DA on 21 January 1917 to join XIV Corps and was attached to 29th DA on the left of the corps' front, moving into position at Morlancourt. Left Group of 29th DA included LXVII AFA Bde (ex-GDA), XCIII AFA Bde (ex 21st DA) and CXLVII AFA Bde (ex 29th DA). These came into action between 21 and 24 January for an attack at Le Transloy by 87th Infantry Bde. The attack was carefully prepared: the Germans had been noted as 'standing to' in their trenches at 05.30 each morning, so that was chosen as zero for an intense barrage. The first barrage of 18-pdr dropped on the enemy front line, where it remained for 5 minutes. During the last minute it was joined by a second barrage in No man's land, 25–50 yards (23–46 m) short of the German line (where enemy outposts might be expected, and to cover the advance), then both lifted together to a line 100 yards (91 m) beyond the front trench. From there they combined as a creeping barrage advancing at 25 yards (23 m) per minute to the final protective line about 400 yards (370 m) ahead. Meanwhile, the 4.5-inch howitzers and XIV Corps' Heavy Artillery bombarded trench and road junctions, strongpoints and machine gun posts. The attacking battalions (1st Bn Royal Inniskilling Fusiliers and 1st Border Regiment) had carefully practised over a facsimile of the enemy trenches. They closely followed the barrage from their assembly trench and captured the enemy's first and support trenches with ease, except on the left where a strongpoint held out for a quarter of an hour, causing a number of casualties. The barrage had passed over two reserve points, 'Ersatz 1' and 'Ersatz 2', and they gave no trouble. Almost 400 prisoners were taken and the captured ground was quickly put into a state of defence despite the frozen ground. The AFA brigades came out of action on 29 January, LXXVI AFA Bde going to billets at Morlancourt.

The brigade trained at Morlancourt until 22 February, when it returned to positions in front of Combles and began registering targets in front of Sailly-Saillisel. A/LXXVI Battery was assigned to 29th DA Group, while the rest of the brigade, together with XCIII and CXLVII AFA Bdes, Guards DA, and other artillery including heavies and trench mortars, formed a large concentration to support another limited operation by 29th Division. This was carried out on 28 February by 86th Infantry Bde against 'Potsdam Trench' and 'Palz Trench' in front of Sailly-Saillisel. Next day Guards Division relieved 29th Division and LXXVI Bde remained to cover it. The large concentration of guns had been dispersed, and the whole of XIV Corps' front was now covered by just the three AFA brigades, Guards DA and one brigade of 29th DA. Having already abandoned a number of villages on Fifth Army's front in late February, the Germans on XIV Corps' front began a retreat to the Hindenburg Line (Operation Alberich) on the night of 13/14 March. While Guards DA supported the infantry pursuit, the AFA brigades and 29th DA remained to protect the British line. LXXVI Brigade then withdrew its guns to the waggon lines on 16–17 March, and the batteries overhauled their equipment.

=== Vimy Ridge ===
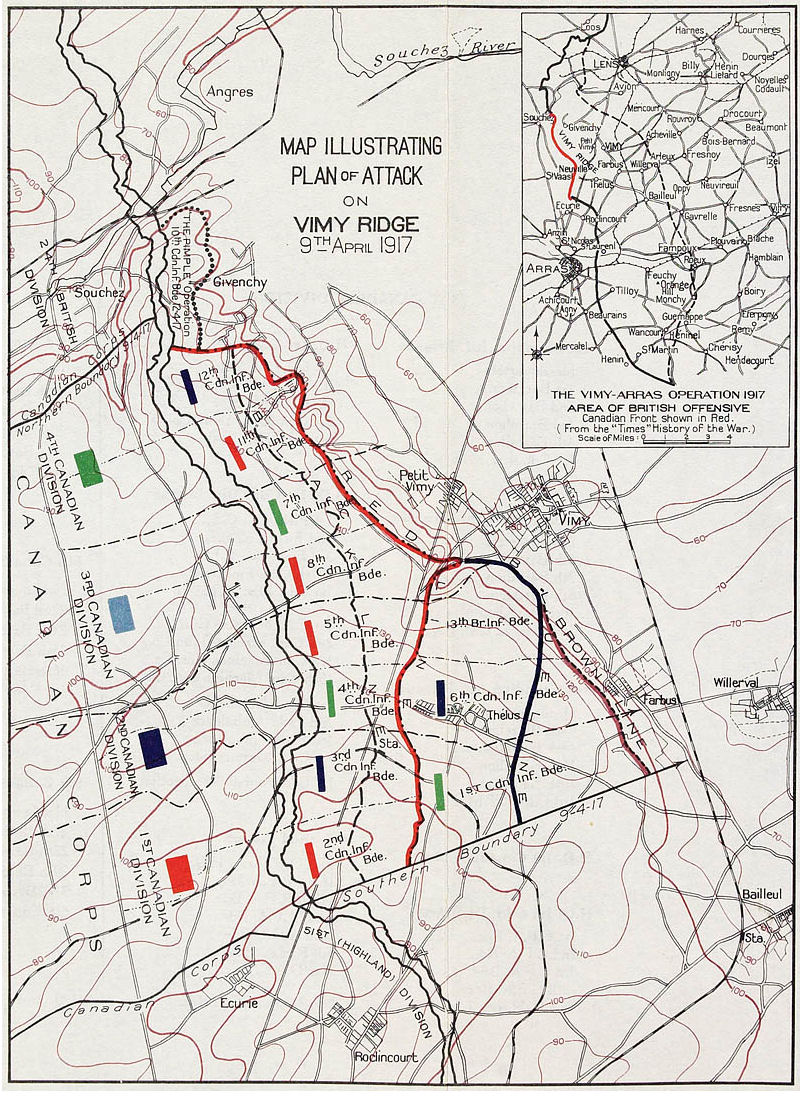
Canadian Corps' plan of attack at Vimy Ridge.

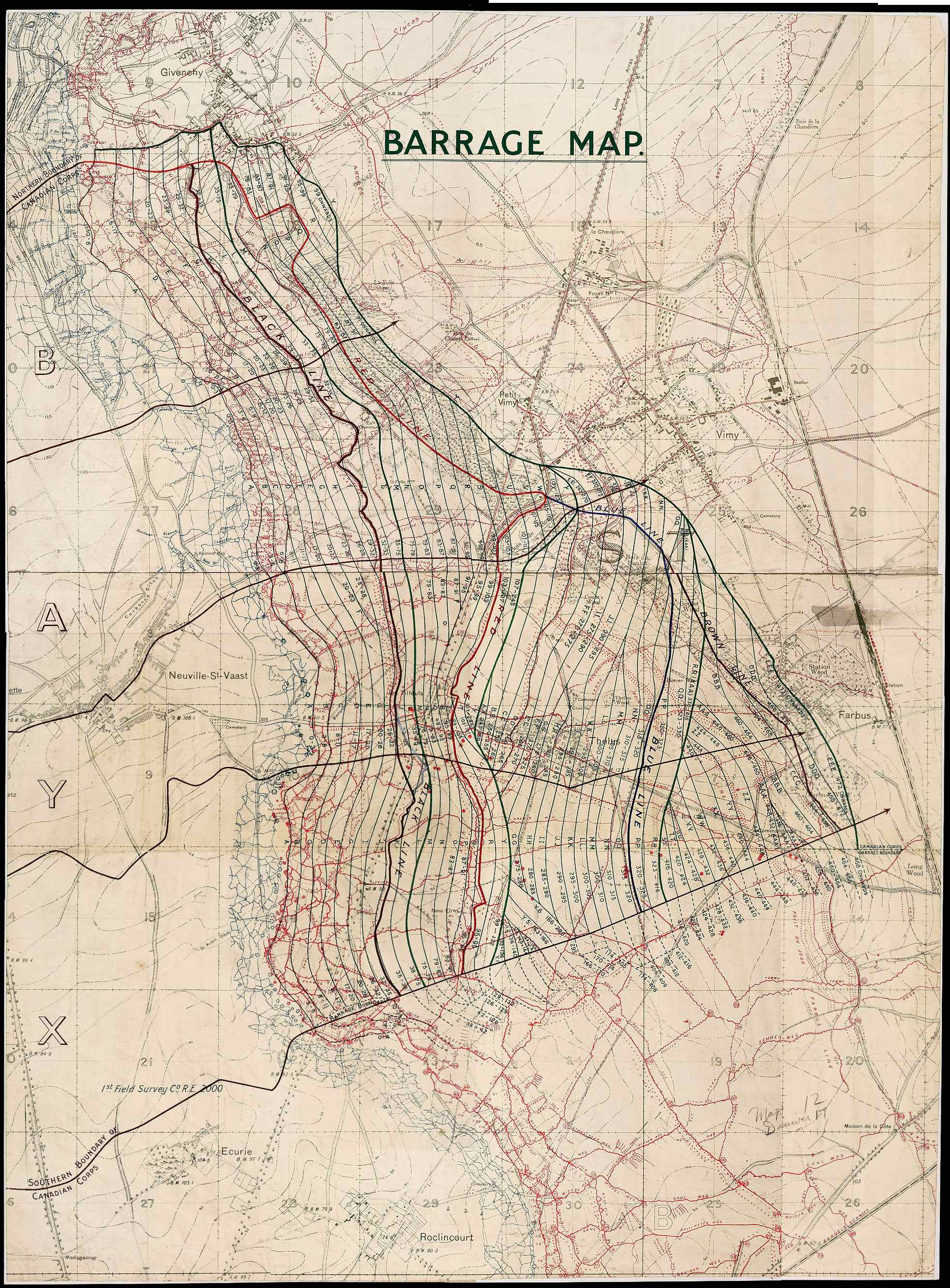
The rolling barrage map for the attack.

From 21 to 28 March the brigade carried out a long march north to Gouy, west of Arras, where it came under the command of Canadian Corps, which was preparing for the Battle of Vimy Ridge. On 31 March the batteries moved up to positions at Carency and then began registering targets on the ridge, as well as firing some feint barrages to confuse the enemy. On 7 April the brigade was joined by a new 503rd (Howitzer) Battery from England, which completed its final organisation:

- A, B and Btys – each 6 x 18-pdrs
- D (ex 503rd) (H) Bty – 6 x 4.5-inch
- LXXVI BAC

The attack was launched on 9 April with massive artillery support. There was one 18-pdr for every 20 yards (18 m) of front, with an ammunition allowance of 300 rounds per gun for the first two days of the battle. The plan was for the 4.5-inch howitzers (including the newly arrived D (H) Bty) to fire a standing barrage on the German support line at Zero, while the creeping barrage of 18-pdrs (firing 50 per cent HE and 50 per cent shrapnel at two rounds per minute, advancing at 100 yards (91 m) every 4 minutes), carried the infantry to their first objective. When the two barrages met the howitzers would lift to the second objective (the Blue Line) while the creeping barrage rolled on. Zero was at 05.30 and LXXVI Bde opened its barrage supporting 11th Canadian Infantry Brigade in its attack on Hill 145, the highest point of the ridge. On the brigade's left, half the leading wave of 87th Canadian Battalion was cut down by machine gun fire, and much of the supporting 75th Canadian Battalion was pinned down in its assembly trenches. Those who could pressed on under fire from Germans emerging from mine-shafts in their rear, and from the second line in front once the barrage had passed. The brigade's attack broke down but by 13.00 bombing parties had successfully taken the slopes of Hill 145 and LXXVI Bde and provided a slow barrage to protect the 75th Bn while they consolidated the ground gained. All along the ridge the Canadians now held the high ground. The following day LXXVI Bde fired to disperse German troops massing for counter-attacks, and on 11 April it threw shells over the ridge into areas where they might be massing. On 12 April the batteries fired a feint barrage in support of the neighbouring I Corps' attack on 'The Pimple' and Bois-en-Hache.

By 13 April the enemy was withdrawing to avoid being overlooked from the captured ridge. The brigade established an OP on Hill 145 and the batteries 'sniped' at the retiring enemy. Over the following days working parties of gunners began preparing new positions at Cité de Caumont south of Angres and built a road across the Souchez Valley to reach them. The guns and HQ moved into the new positions on 18 April. On 23 April the brigade put down a barrage for an attack on La Coulotte in the German Third Line by 15th Infantry Brigade of 5th British Division, and had to fire all day to cover the survivors of the failed attack. Having revealed their positions, the batteries in turn came under German CB fire, with B and D Btys suffering considerable damage and many casualties, some of them taking shelter in cellars that were blown in. The newly arrived D Bty was so badly hit that the CRA of Reserve Division Artillery ordered it back to the waggon lines to recover, handing its howitzers over to D (H)/V Bty, which had several of its own guns knocked out. Brigade HQ and the remaining batteries came under continued fire over the following days, and on 26 April A and B Btys retired half their guns to new positions at Angres Château. Next day the rest of the guns followed, and Bde HQ was established at Bois-en-Hache; C Bty followed on 29 April.

=== Messines ===
LXXVI Brigade remained at Souchez under the command of Canadian Corps until 17 May, when it transferred to 36th (Ulster) Division, joining it south of the Ypres Salient on 23 May after overhauling its guns. Second Army was planning another set-piece attack, this time to capture the Messines–Wytschaete Ridge. Again, massive artillery resources were gathered: 1000 rounds per gun for 18-pdrs, 750 for 4.5s. The reinforcing AFA brigades were brought in secretly a battery at a time, often under cover of other artillery concentrations. LXXVI Brigade's batteries took up positions east of Kemmel, with HQ on the nearby Mont Kemmel, but were under orders to shoot only when ordered to do so by the divisional HQ. The Germans, too, had gathered large artillery resources to counter this obvious attack, and caused much damage among the British batteries during the preliminary bombardments, which had started in early May. The full bombardment, including wire-cutting, began on 31 May and the barrages were rehearsed on 3 and 5 June to induce the enemy to reveal their batteries. LXXVI Brigade fired shrapnel and gas during a bombardment by the heavy artillery on 6 June. British artillery fire died away about 02.40 on the morning of 7 June. Before dawn, at 03.10, the surprise element of the plan was revealed: the simultaneous explosion of 19 huge mines dug under the ridge, which blew the German front line system to bits before the infantry advanced. For the field guns the plan for the attack was similar to that at Vimy: two-thirds of the 18-pdrs would fire a creeping barrage of shrapnel and smoke shells, while the remainder placed a standing barrage 700 yards (640 m) ahead of its start line. D (H)/LXXVI Battery was assigned to CB fire for this operation. As the infantry reached each objective the creeping barrage would become a protective barrage sweeping and searching 150–300 yards (140–270 m) in front of them while they consolidated. 36th (U) Division moved forward on a frontage of two infantry brigades (107th and 109th) each with two battalions in line followed by a battalion of 108th Infantry Bde to 'mop up' behind them. Two companies of each battalion skirted the huge mine craters and advanced to the first objective (the 'Red Line'), reaching it at 03.45. The Ulster Division met almost no opposition in the wrecked forward German trenches, except a couple of machine guns in front firing through the barrage. The German counter-barrage was also unusually weak. After a 15-minute halt the barrage moved on again followed by the remaining companies of the leading battalions. Once they reached the second objective (the 'Blue Line') at 04.50 they stopped to consolidate it. After a 2-hour pause the remaining battalions of 107th and 109th Bdes passed through scattered German shellfire and followed their barrage to the 'Green Line'. Only as they approached the 'Black Line' objective did they meet any significant opposition. Having captured the Black Line they consolidated and sent forward patrols to the 'Mauve Line'. Not until after 13.00 did the first German counter-attack appear, against the neighbouring divisions, and was broken up by the protective barrage. At 15.10 the creeping barrage re-started, covering the advance of 11th (N) Division through the Mauve Line to take and consolidate the Oosttaverne Line beyond, on the rear slope of the ridge. Although there were fewer guns forward enough to fire this last barrage, it was equally powerful because the frontage had shortened with each advance, as the Second Army crushed the Wytschaete Salient, and the batteries now had OPs on top of the ridge.

=== Ypres ===
By the end of the attack LXXVI Bde's guns were out of range, and they were withdrawn to the waggon lines at Dranouter the following morning. Although it was assigned on 17 June to 38th (Welsh) Division in XIV Corps (now at the northern end of Fifth Army's front), the brigade did not go into action immediately. It spent late May and early June resting and refitting at Proven, while Lt-Col Bryant commanded Left Group of 38th (W) DA for another officer who was sick. In late June 38 (W) DA were wire-cutting for the forthcoming Ypres Offensive. From 17 June LXXVI AFA Brigade worked on new gun positions and ammunition dumps at Navora Farm near Brielen, then moved into them on 13 July to reinforce the Welsh Division's guns just as the bombardment and counter-bombardment approached their climax. Z Day for the offensive was finally set for 31 July. On the morning of 27 July the Royal Flying Corps reported that the battered enemy trenches in front of 38th (W) and Guards Division were unoccupied. The two divisions sent forward patrols to test the defences and found that the Germans had evacuated the whole of their first position to avoid the shelling, and they were able to establish a line across the Yser Canal.

The offensive was launched with the Battle of Pilckem Ridge on Z Day. By 02.30 the infantry had formed up in the assembly trenches on the far side of the canal. The enemy was unusually quiet, which was attributed to the heavy gas shelling of their positions. At 03.50 the guns opened, firing the biggest creeping barrage ever attempted. Two-thirds of the 18-pdrs were in this barrage, while the rest of the 18-pdrs and the 4.5-inch howitzers fired a standing barrage on the German second line, which lifted as the creeping barrage approached. The infantry had carefully practised their attack, timed to follow the creeping barrage. Supported by LXXVI Bde 114th Infantry Bde of 38th (W) Division took their 'Blue Line' objectives with little opposition and captured the Germans sheltering in the 'Caesar's Nose' dugouts. They went on to take and consolidate the 'Black Line', but ran into more opposition in reaching the 'Green Line' beyond 'Iron Cross Ridge'. LXXVI Brigade ceased fire at 09.40. Eventually 115th Infantry Bde established a line along the Steenbeek stream, protected from counter-attacks by standing artillery barrages, LXXVI Bde participating in these 'SOS' barrages. The success in this area was attributed to the excellent cooperation between the infantry and artillery. From 15 to 31 July LXXVI Bde's 18-pdr batteries had fired 18,500 rounds each, and the four howitzers of D Bty had fried 10,500. Next day they moved up to positions near the old German front line and continued with harassing fire.

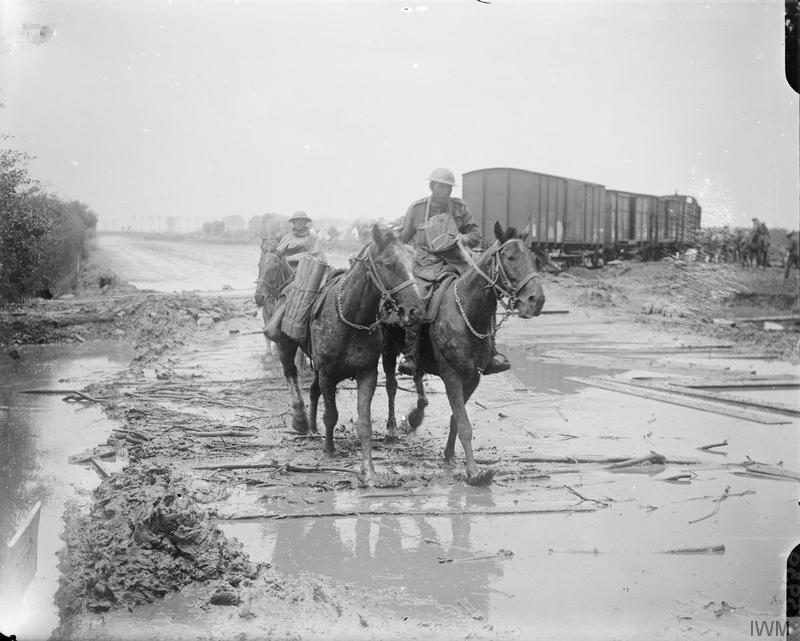
Field gun ammunition being taken forward by pack horses, 1 August 1917.

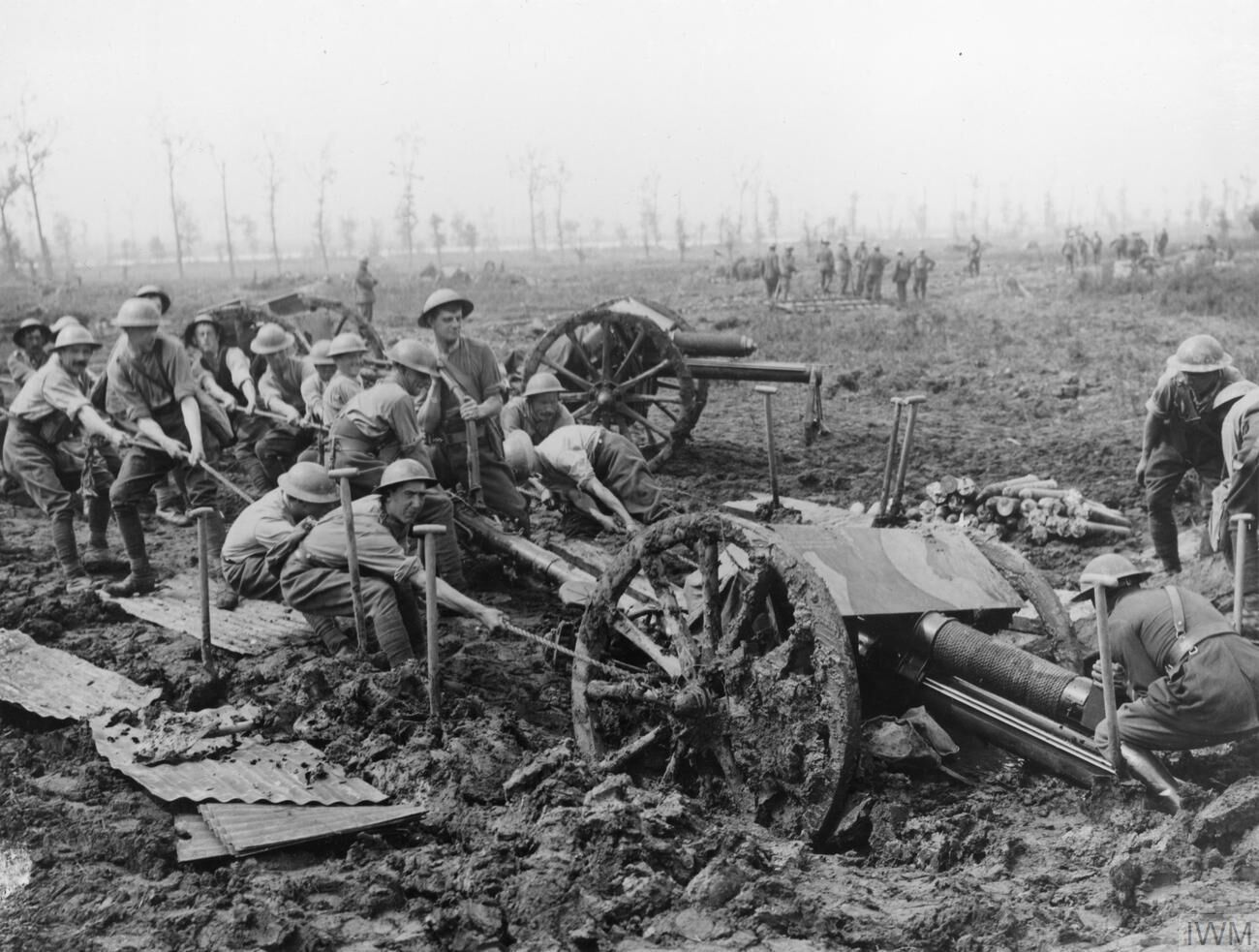
18-pounders being hauled out of mud at Ypres, August 1917.

During the afternoon of the battle it had begun to rain, and this continued for days. With mud hampering movement in the forward area, ammunition had to be taken up to the batteries by pack animals. Conditions for the troops holding the line of the Steenbeek were terrible, but it was not until 6 August that the infantry of 38th (W) Division could be relieved and rested. Meanwhile, LXXVI Bde remained in action under command of 20th (L) DA to prepare for the next phase of the offensive, the Battle of Langemarck, on 16 August. XIV Corps' artillery planning for this operation was good, and 20th (L) Division captured Langemarck village behind a good barrage, to which LXXVII Bde contributed from 04.35 to 10.20, and many Germans fled at the approach of the barrage. In the evening the brigade fired barrages on 'SOS' lines to help repulse a counter-attack. However, the overall battle was not a success and the Germans holding the higher ground continued to inflict heavy casualties.

After this failure the main effort in the offensive shifted to Second Army. 38th (W) and 20th (L) Divisions alternated in holding the line, and LXXVI Bde contributed harassing fire and barrages for minor operations. The brigade withdrew its guns on 30–31 August and rested at Le Pont de Wylder until 9 September. It returned to Navora Farm on 12 September and resumed harassing fire and shoots on the German's new shell-hole defence system. After two practice barrages on 17 and 18 September, LXXVI Bde joined in a creeping barrage at 04.50 on 20 September to support the attack of 61st Infantry Bde (20th (L) Division) on 'Kangaroo Trench', part of the Battle of the Menin Road Ridge. Although only a short advance was planned, the infantry got held up and lost the barrage, so gains in this sector were meagre.

On 22 September LXXVI Bde was shifted to reinforce V Corps, taking over gun position at Wieltje. The brigade came under the command of 55th (West Lancashire) Division, which was relieved two days later by 59th (2nd North Midland) Division. For the Battle of Polygon Wood on 26 September it fired a creeping barrage at 05.50 in support of 178th Infantry Bde. The barrage was effective and the final objective was reached with few casualties. The batteries began registering targets on the enemy's new lines, but on 27 September they were ordered to withdraw by sections and return to XIV Corps on Fifth Army's front, with HQ at Navora Farm once more. During the relief the commanders of A and B Btys were both killed (Note: Majors John Baylis (A Bty), and Edward Morgan (B Bty) are buried at Canada Farm Cemetery and Dozinghem Military Cemetery respectively.)

As LXXVI Bde's batteries established their new gun positions along the Steenbeek 4th Division was taking over the line for the Battle of Broodseinde. The attack went in on 4 October. Although the division advancing behind its creeping barrage took almost all of its assigned ground, the protective barrage as it consolidated was reported as very ragged. It had become extremely difficult to move guns and ammunition forward over the muddy shell-torn ground and the field guns were firing at extreme range. For the next push, the Battle of Poelcappelle on 9 October, LXXVI Bde (less C Bty) together with 4th DA and LXV AFA Bde formed Right Group supporting 29th Division; C Battery was with Centre Group. All the batteries except A and B/LXXVI were too far back and had to move 2,000 yards (1,800 m) down the forward slope of Pilckem Ridge to the Steenbeek in daylight. Nevertheless, the German artillery took no action and the batteries and ammunition dumps were ready in time, despite the appalling mud. Consequently, XIV Corps' barrages were more effective than elsewhere in the battle, and 29th Division reached its final objective on time. The fresh 17th (N) Division took over the line next day, though the artillery remained in place.

In the First Battle of Passchendaele on 12 October, XIV Corps was able to extend its perimeter northwards towards Houthulst Forest because its artillery had fewer difficulties than on other parts of the battlefield, and the Germans in front of 17th (N) Division would not face the barrage. However, hostile artillery fire began to take a steady toll of men and equipment: D Bty had two guns destroyed on 17 October and suffered several casualties. Brigade HQ was bombarded with Mustard gas on 20 October, and Lt-Col Bryant and several others were gassed; Maj Curling of A Bty took over command, but he and Maj Ideson (C Bty) were also gassed next day. Major Menzies took over temporarily. Meanwhile, the batteries were being shelled every day and casualties mounted. The brigade fired a barrage for 57th (2nd West Lancashire) Division on 26 October (the Second Battle of Passchendaele). By now the ground conditions were dreadful: the infantry advanced slowly through knee-deep mud, their rifles became clogged, and they soon returned to the start line. Finally on 27 October LXXVI Bde handed over its guns to XI AFA Bde and the men went back to Hazebrouck to rest and refit. Major Rogers (RHA) was promoted to command the brigade and arrived to take over on 30 October.

=== Italy ===
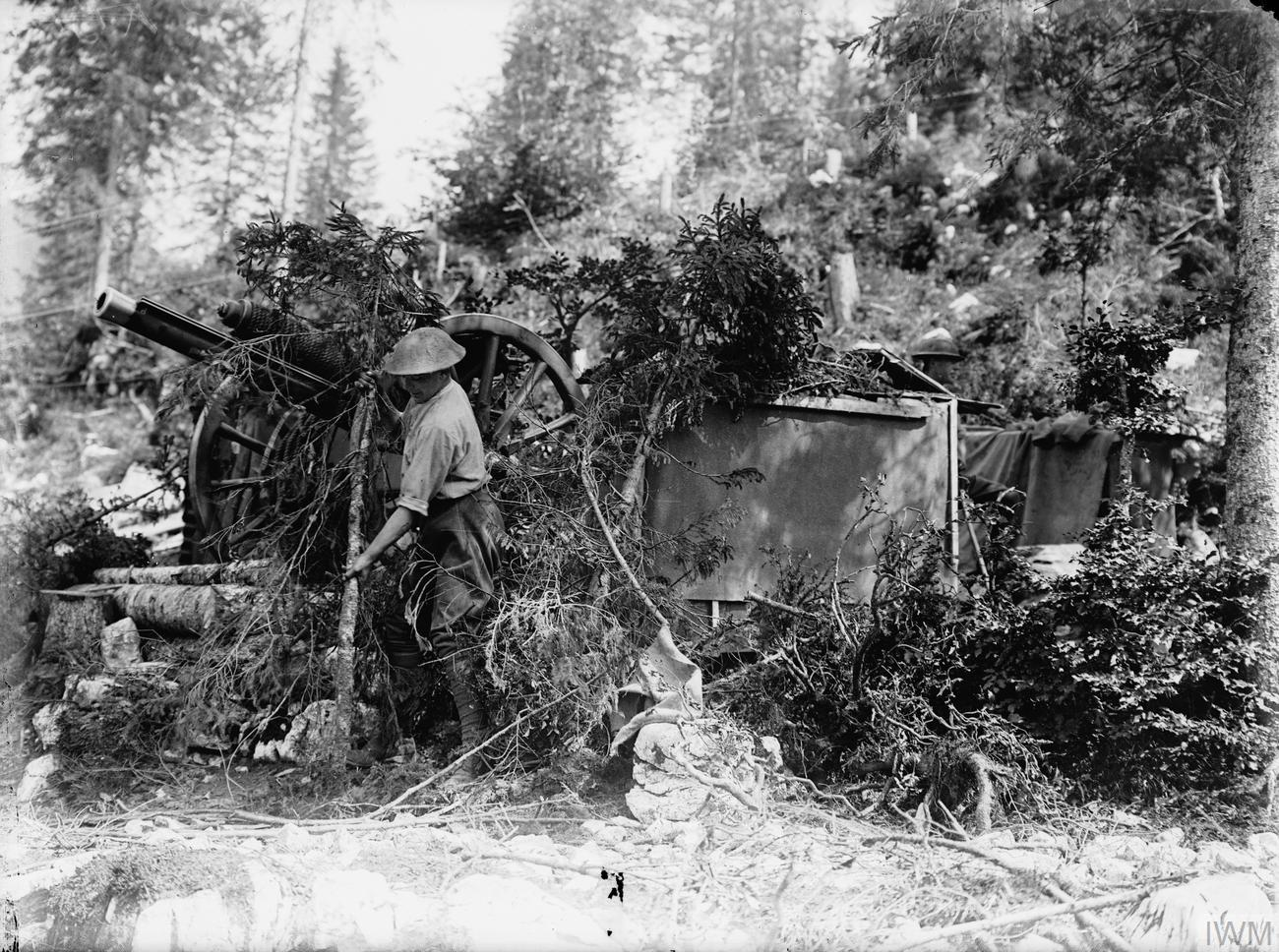
A camouflaged 18-pdr in Italy, 1918.

The Germans and Austrians launched a major offensive on the Italian Front in October 1917, and soon broke through at the Battle of Caporetto. Reinforcements for the Italians were rushed from the Western Front, including XIV Corps and its attached troops. LXXVI AFA Brigade was ordered to Italy on 12 November and after drawing guns from 17th (N) DA it made the journey by train between 20 and 27 November. By then the breakthrough at Caporetto had been halted, and the brigade was attached to 7th Division, which formed the corps reserve around Vedelago, west of Treviso, behind the line of the River Piave. Only C/LXXVI Bty was up at the front, forming part of 'Army Troops'.

On 3 December the rest of LXXVI Bde was ordered to move to Ospedaletto, which it reached after a three-day march, when it went into billets and began training. On 11–12 December it moved on to Tombolo, where it transferred from XIV Corps to XI Corps and C Bty rejoined. The brigade resumed battery training. Corps HQ attached the brigade to 5th Division at Sant' Ambrogio, south of Cittadella from 21 December. It continued training through the winter. On 22 January 5th Division was ordered to take over a section of the front line in the Arcade sector on the Piave, relieving Italian troops. LXXVI Brigade followed next day. The march was hampered by a sudden thaw that rendered the roads very muddy, but the men went into billets at Villa di Villa. 5th Division's artillery began the relief on 28 January, with LXXVI Bde HQ and the waggon lines at Mussano. However, enemy aircraft bombed Mussano next day and the waggon lines were relocated to Paderno. The relief was completed on 4 February. The batteries began improving their positions and calibrating their guns. The line was quiet, but enemy bombers were active over the back areas at night. Once calibrated, LXXVI Bde began CB shoots with aircraft observation 5th Division was allocated a large number of additional artillery units for a planned attack on 5/6 March, when the infantry would attempt to force a night crossing of the Piave covered by a rolling barrage. The batteries registered their targets and the infantry practised the attack with Royal Navy seamen and Venetian gondoliers, but bad weather set in and by 3/4 March the river level had risen by 4 feet (1.2 m), washing away the engineers' bridging preparations. The infantry operation was cancelled in favour of a two-day artillery 'demonstration' instead, but this too was cancelled and the additional batteries began to withdraw. LXXVI AFA Brigade, together with 5th Division, was transferred back to XIV Corps on 9 March.

=== Western Front ===
The expected German spring offensive on the Western Front opened on 21 March, and immediately troops were recalled from Italy to meet the crisis. LXXVI AFA Brigade received orders on 24 March to travel back to France with 5th Division, and it began entraining at Castelfranco next day. the brigade detrained in France on 29 March and marched to Pont-Remy, where it went into billets. It joined VI Corps in Third Army on 12 April and remained with it for the rest of the war.

At first the brigade was assigned to 2nd Canadian Division, which was holding the left of the corps' line following the chaos of the German offensive. The guns carried out the usual harassing fire, supporting fire for raids, and 'SOS' tasks requested by the infantry, while their battery positions were sometimes bombarded with mustard gas. On the evening of 21 May C Bty's forward gun was destroyed by shellfire, and the battery's Canadian commander, Maj John Trebilcock, was killed by exploding ammunition while looking for his men. (Note: Major Trebilcock is buried at Bac-du-Sud British Cemetery, Bailleulval.) Hostile artillery fire declined in June. 3rd Canadian Division relieved 2nd Canadian Division at the beginning of July, but LXXVI Bde remained in position until it was itself relieved on 10–12 July and went into Corps Reserve at Fosseux. On 17 July the brigade moved to Berles-au-Bois, where it became a mobile reserve for 2nd Division in the Right Sector of VI Corps' line.

=== Hundred Days Offensive ===
Fourth Army launched the Allied counter-offensive (the Hundred Days Offensive) with the Battle of Amiens on 8 August. LXXVI Brigade was briefly designated GHQ Reserve and prepared to entrain at 24 hours' notice, but the order was cancelled and it reverted to 2nd Division. It went into action with that division on the night of 19/20 August as Third Army joined in the offensive with the Battle of Albert on 21 August. VI Corps's objective was the Moyenneville–Ablainzevelle Ridge, with 2nd Division attacking 'Moyblain Trench'. Zero was at 04.55. There was no preliminary bombardment and no creeping barrage except through Moyennville; instead there were three overlapping standing barrages, the first on a slight ridge between the start line and the first objective, the second on the first objective, and the third on a line through Courcelles. On 2nd Division's front the first barrage came down about 300 yards (270 m) west of Moyblain Trench and the infantry and tanks advanced through thick mist. There was little opposition in the German outposts and first line, though the infantry suffered large numbers of men out of action from the effects of mustard gas both in their assembly trenches and in the long grass through which they advanced. By 06.00 the division had taken its second objective, and 3rd Division passed through to secure Courcelles before being held up along the Arras–Achiet-le-Grand railway. The batteries of LXXVI Bde moved up at 06.30 and crossed the old German front line before coming into action again. VI Corps then regrouped to continue the battle, 3rd DA taking command of the Right Sector artillery, which covered the consolidation operations. At 03.00 on 23 August 3rd Division attacked Gomiécourt behind a creeping barrage of 75 per cent shrapnel and 25 per cent HE, reaching its objectives about 06.00. Then 2nd Division advanced from Moyblain Trench across the railway, passed through 3rd Division and advanced towards Ervillers. However, the creeping barrage was timed to suit the pace of Whippet tanks, and was too fast for the infantry. The division took Ervillers but could not reach Béhagnies and Sapignies. LXXVI Brigade followed up to just west of the railway. 2nd Division failed again next day, but 5th Infantry Bde captured Béhagnies in a surprise night attack early on 25 August, and then followed the barrage involving all of LXXVI's batteries to take Sapignies. Once again LXXVI Bde followed up to take up positions east of Béhagnies. 2nd Division's history noted the 'splendid co-operation of the artillery'. At 08.10 62nd (2nd West Riding) Division passed through to continue the offensive and its CRA took command of the right sector artillery.

VI Corps continued to advance over the following days, preceded by patrols, and the artillery followed up, providing barrages to help clear up pockets of resistance. On 29 August LXXVI's batteries fired for a local operation, during which they were machine gunned by hostile aircraft. The advance was stopped on 30 August by stronger resistance and a counter-attack at Écoust-Saint-Mein. The artillery supported 62nd (2nd WR) Division in taking Vaulx-Vraucourt on 1 September, then next day VI Corps made a formal attack against Lagnicourt and Morchies. Although these objectives were not attained, considerable progress was made and the artillery caused serious damage among the retreating German batteries and transport. That night 2nd DA HQ took over from 62nd (2nd WR) DA, and LXXVI Bde went into divisional reserve. On 7 September the brigade moved back to Béhagnies in Corps Reserve for training until 10 September. It returned to action with 62nd (2nd WR) DA on 11 September for next morning's Battle of Havrincourt, in which the division attacked behind a creeping barrage at 05.40, broke through the Hindenburg Line positions and took Havrincourt, after which enemy counter-attacks were broken up by artillery fire. The artillery fired SOS barrages to help the infantry against further counter-attacks on 13 September, then on 14 September supported 62nd (2nd WR) Division in a successful local attack on Havrincourt Cemetery. That night LXXVI Bde passed to the command of 2nd DA as the centre division of the corps. Two nights later 2nd Division was relieved and the brigade came under 3rd DA (right division). VI Corps remained in these positions for several days, under heavy German shellfire, including gas shelling of battery positions, and frequent counter-attacks, to which the field artillery replied with SOS tasks and 'searching' fire along enemy lines of approach.

The Allies launched a coordinated series of offensives along the Western Front on 26 September; Third Army joined in on 27 September (the Battle of the Canal du Nord), with VI Corps tasked with clearing the Flesquières Ridge and the Hindenburg Support position. The barrage for 3rd Division's advance was complicated because the line of the first objective was oblique, and the neighbouring IV Corps to the right was not beginning its attack until 3 hours after Zero, which was at 05.20. Nevertheless, the attack went well, 3rd Division rapidly taking Flesquières and Ribécourt. 62nd (2nd WR) Division took the lead from 11.50, assuming control of the field artillery. Some batteries had begun moving forward at 09.20 to bring the further objectives in range of the barrage. However, the Guards on the left had been held up, and with both flanks open 62nd (2nd WR) Division encountered heavier opposition and could only advance about 1,000 yards (910 m). The division continued the advance before dawn next day in cooperation with IV Corps. Catching the enemy by surprise on a dark and rainy night, the attack was a complete success. At 06.30 the main attack opened, closely supported by the artillery, and 62nd (2nd WR) Division swept forward to Marcoing and crossed the mud-filled St Quentin Canal, reaching the railway embankment beyond before being stopped by heavy fire. Fresh attacks behind a barrage at 18.30 took the enemy's Marcoing Line, then advances to enlarge the Marcoing bridgehead to Masnières were made on 29 September, reaching the Rumilly Trenches. Here a German counter-attack regained two pockets in the Rumilly Support trench, and a barrage was laid on for the reserve battalion to clear these. However, the battalion had to cross the canal in single file and could not keep up with the barrage. LXXVI Brigade moved up to positions south of Marcoing. Heavy rain fell that night, and VI Corps made no progress next day against stiffening opposition, but on 1 October 3 Division passed through at Zero hour (06.00) and took Rumilly behind a creeping barrage.

There was little activity on VI Corps' front until early on 8 October, when the Second Battle of Cambrai was launched. 2nd and 3rd Divisions put in an attack at 04.30 behind a creeping barrage. 3rd Division was successful in reaching its first objective, but 2nd Division was partly pushed back by a German counter-attack employing captured British Mark IV tanks. When 3rd Division tried to carry on behind a weak barrage it found its flanks enfiladed. VI Corps ordered a combined attack behind a new barrage at 18.00, and this succeeded in taking the second objective. During the night the infantry were pulled back 300 yards (270 m) from the Esnes–Niergnies road so that next morning's barrage could come down on this line. This was at 05.20, and the attack was made 20 minutes later by Guards Division passing through, each brigade being accompanied by sections of field artillery to operate as anti-tank guns if the enemy armour reappeared. However, the enemy had disappeared, and patrols did not locate resistance until the objectives had been achieved. That night VI Corps reorganised its artillery: LXXVI Bde was withdrawn into Corps Reserve while Third Army pursued the enemy to the River Selle.

The Brigade was attached to Guards Division at Carnières from 14 October for the Battle of the Selle. Apart from wire-cutting, there was no preliminary bombardment, and Third Army's surprise attack was launched at 02.00 on 20 October under a full moon. The barrage used no HE shells over the riverside town of Solesmes, which was still occupied by French civilians, who it was hoped could avoid shrapnel and machine gun bullets by sheltering in cellars; the full barrage crept round the sides of the town. While the infantry crossed the river by floating footbridges, the Royal Engineers built two trestle bridges over the river for the field artillery to advance: the first was ready at 01.45, the other before dawn. The first objective was taken with only slight casualties, some caused by getting too close to the barrage, but there was more resistance thereafter and the infantry lost the barrage. While Guards DA organised renewed artillery preparation, the enemy in front gave way at 06.30 and by 07.00 the division was on the final objective, overlooking Vertain and Romeries in the Harpies valley. Here they dug in to protect themselves from the German retaliatory artillery, while field batteries pushed up to join them in close support. The other batteries closed up to the river, with LXXVI Bde at Haussy. Next day there was no formal attack – artillery ammunition supply was restricted because of the difficulties of bringing it over the river, and shortages of water for the horses further back – but infantry patrols pushed forward, while VI Corps transferred LXXVI Bde from Left Division (Guards) to Right Division (62nd (2nd WR)). On 23 October 3rd Division passed through 62nd (2nd WR) Division and advanced 3 miles (4.8 km), wading across the Harpies and taking Romeries. Here it was joined by the field artillery and carried on to its fifth objective, but foot and cavalry patrols found the River Écaillon ahead strongly held and no further exploitation was possible. On the morning of 24 October a barrage was put down along the Écaillon for 24 minutes to allow the infantry to close up, then lifted 400 yards (370 m) beyond and stood for an hour, protecting the infantry as they waded across in the dark. The advance then continued, brushing aside German resistance along some high ground, passing through Ruesnes, before halting in front of a railway line still held by the enemy. Next morning the railway line was found abandoned and VI Corps was reorganised for pursuit, 3rd Division as the advance guard with its own divisional artillery and LXXVI Bde under command as well as the corps cavalry and cyclists. (Note: The Official History has LXXXVI (86th) Bde in the advance guard, but VI Corps RA's War Diary and 'Gun Statement' for 26 October confirm that LXXVI (76th) Bde is meant.) They were ordered to follow up and maintain contact with the enemy, but not to attack against organised resistance. This advance guard pushed on as far as the River Rhonelle, which was the main German line of resistance.

There followed a period of stationary warfare while Third Army closed up to the Rhonelle and brought up ammunition. LXXVI Brigade served briefly with 2nd Division then on 2 November it rejoined 62nd (2nd WR) Division for the Battle of the Sambre on 4 November. Along with 62nd (2nd WR) and 3rd DAs and an affiliated RGA brigade, it formed the corps' Right Group artillery. At 05.30 Guards and 62nd (2nd WR) Division crossed the Rhonelle behind the creeping barrage and reached all the preliminary objectives, and at Zero + 100 minutes LXXVI Bde moved forward to La Folie Farm and came into action again. But there was thick fog, the country was not easy and the Germans fought hard. Ammunition supply for 62nd (2nd WR) Division was held up until Le Quesnoy surrendered to the neighbouring New Zealand Division later in the day, so the advance on the final objectives was called off. This proved to have been the last set-piece action on this part of the front. When the infantry advanced at 07.10 on 5 November, the enemy were found to have retired. A and C Batteries each sent a section of guns forward to give close support to the infantry as they pursued the retreating enemy. For the next week the advance continued against small rearguards, the RFA brigades following their divisions being slowed more by bad weather and roads than the enemy. On 9 November LXXVI Bde reached positions near Maubeuge, but it was unable to cross the Sambre because all the bridges had been blown up. At 11.00 on 11 November hostilities ceased when the Armistice with Germany came into effect. LXXVI AFA Brigade ended the war billeted in Sous-le-Boise in south-west Maubeuge.

=== Post-Armistice ===
VI Corps was selected to serve in Germany as part of the Allied Occupation of the Rhineland. On 18 November the advance began from the Armistice line, with LXXVI AFA Bde attached to Guards DA, marching with D Group behind the infantry brigades. The Belgian roads were in a bad state, but by 30 November the column had passed the River Meuse. The corps crossed the German frontier on 9–11 December. By 19 December the whole division had arrived in the Cologne bridgehead. LXXVI Brigade was billeted in Pulheim, north-west of the city. On 15 March 1919 3rd Division was redesignated 'Northern Division' in British Army of the Rhine (BAOR), and Guards DA was transferred to it, while the rest of Guards Division prepared for demobilisation. On 26 March LXXVI Bde (less its BAC, which was reduced to cadre strength and disbanded on 16 April) was transferred to IX Corps along with the units of 3rd DA. Demobilisation proceeded rapidly during April, and on 15 and 16 May all the remaining demobilisable men were sent away. LXXVI Brigade remained part of BAOR until August 1919, when orders were received to move with Northern Division to the UK, where it was disbanded.

== Memorial ==
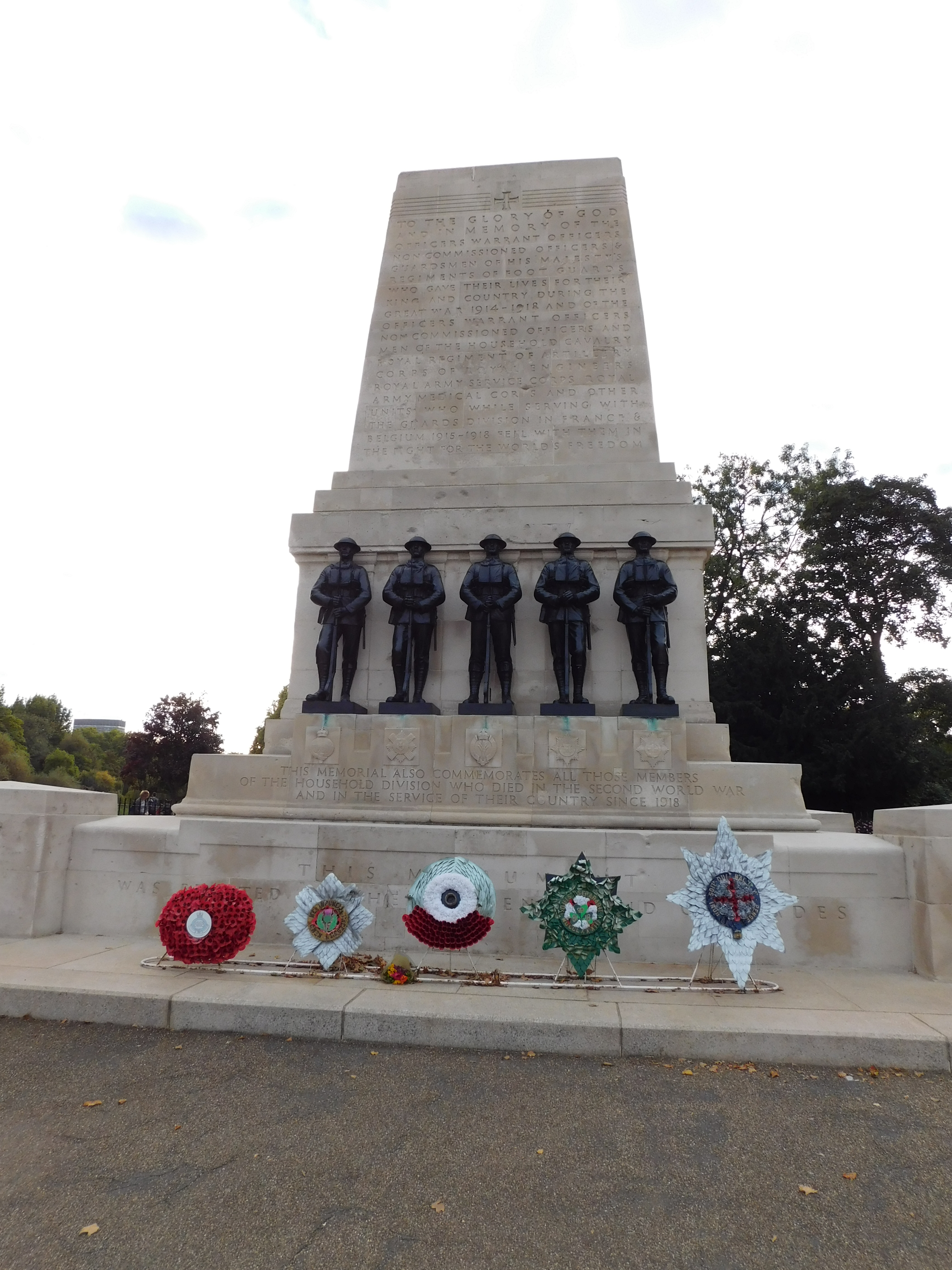
Guards Division Memorial

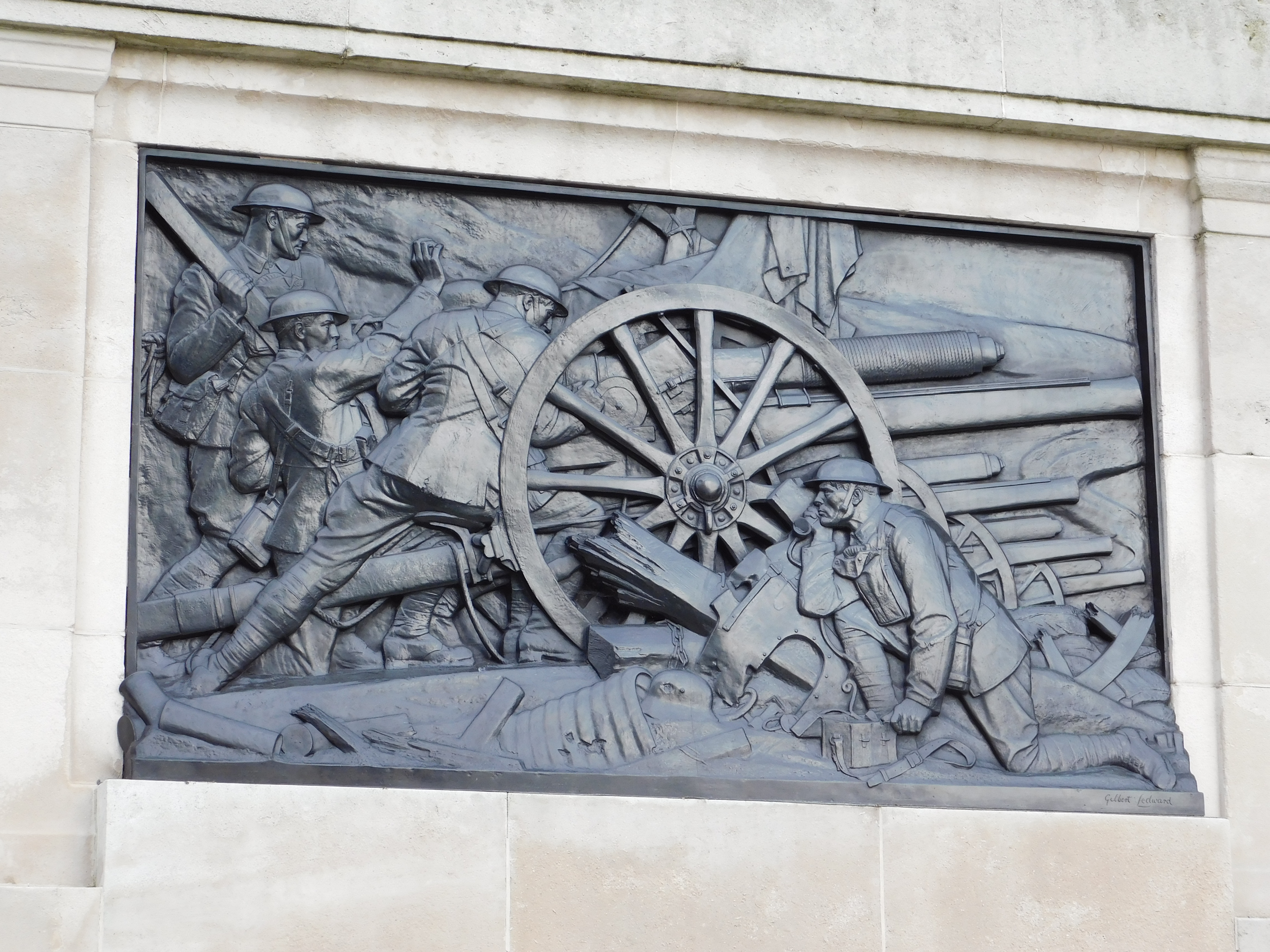
West panel of the Guards Division Memorial.

The Guards Division Memorial opposite Horse Guards Parade in London, dedicated in 1926, carries bronze figures representing the five regiments of foot guards, but the stone cenotaph above lists all the units of the Guards Division, including LXXVI Bde, and a bronze relief panel on the west face depicts the divisional artillery in action. The figures and panels were sculpted by Gilbert Ledward, who had himself served in the war as an artillery officer, and were cast from captured German guns.
