= Hesdigneul =

Hesdigneul may refer to two communes in the Pas-de-Calais department in northern France:

- Hesdigneul-lès-Béthune
- Hesdigneul-lès-Boulogne
