= Fouquereuil =

- Commune
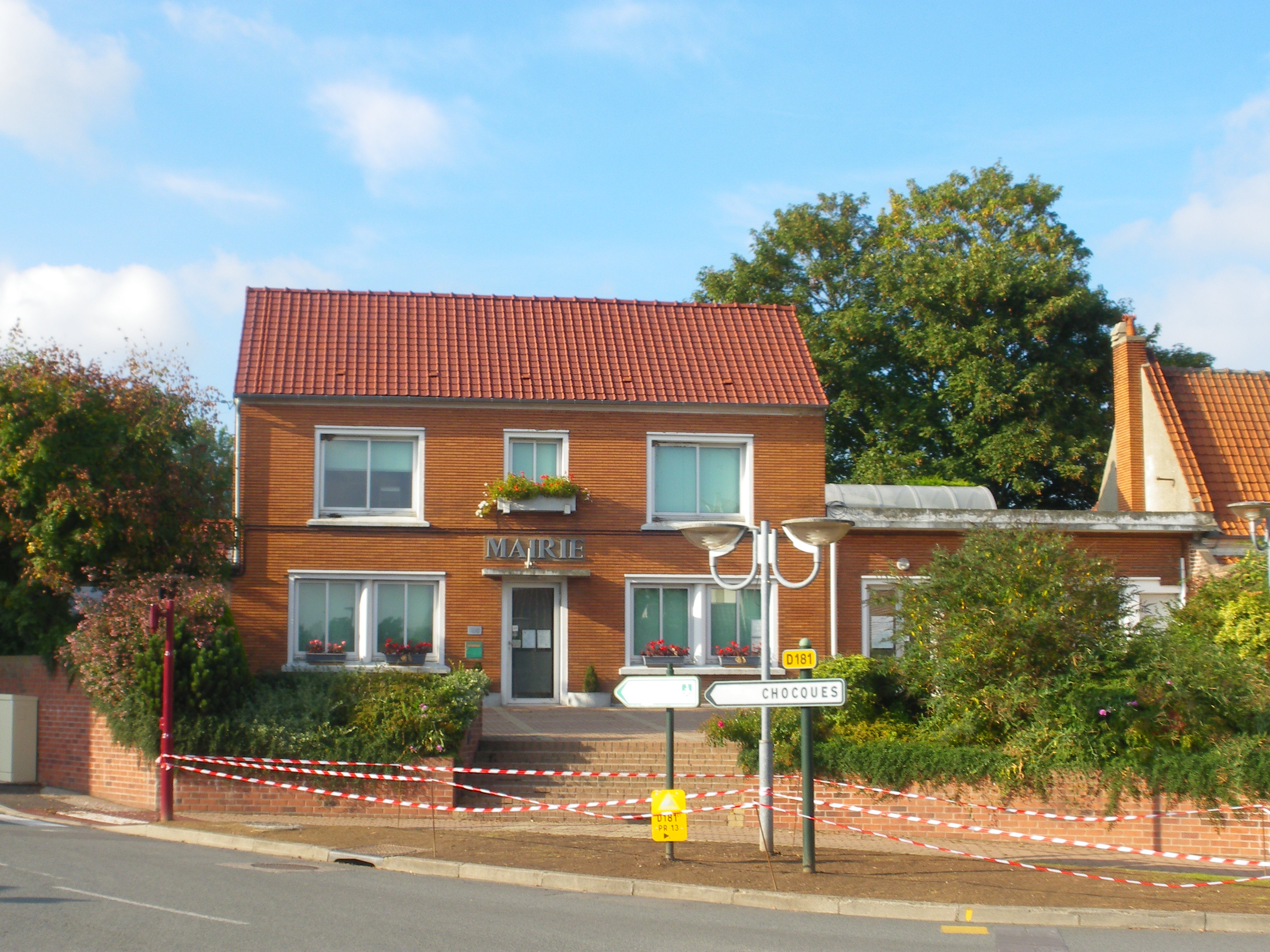
- The town hall of Fouquereuil

- Coat of arms
- Location of Fouquereuil
- Location within France Location within Hauts-de-France
- Coordinates: 50°31′11″N 2°36′07″E
- Country: France
- Region: Hauts-de-France
- Department: Pas-de-Calais
- Arrondissement: Béthune
- Canton: Nœux-les-Mines
- Intercommunality: CA Béthune-Bruay, Artois-Lys Romane

Government
  - Mayor (2020–2026): Gérard Ogiez
- Area^{1}: 2.01 km^{2} (0.78 sq mi)
- Elevation: 28 m (92 ft)
- Highest elevation: 53 m (174 ft)
- Lowest elevation: 24 m (79 ft)
- Population (2023): 1,632
  - Density: 812/km^{2} (2,100/sq mi)
- Time zone: UTC+01:00 (CET)
  - Summer (DST): UTC+02:00 (CEST)
- INSEE/Postal code: 62349 /62232
- ^{1} French Land Register data, which excludes lakes, ponds, glaciers > 1 km^{2} (0.386 sq mi or 247 acres) and river estuaries.

Fouquereuil (French pronunciation: [fukʁœj]) is a commune in the Pas-de-Calais department in the Hauts-de-France region of France 1 mile (1.6 km) southwest of Béthune and 30 miles (48 km) southwest of Lille.

== Population ==
Historical population
Year	Pop.	±% p.a.
1968	1,259	—
1975	1,264	+0.06%
1982	1,115	−1.78%
1990	1,056	−0.68%
1999	1,023	−0.35%
2007	1,164	+1.63%
2012	1,248	+1.40%
2017	1,570	+4.70%
2023	1,632	+0.65%
Source: INSEE

== See also ==
- Communes of the Pas-de-Calais department
