= Houchin =

- Commune
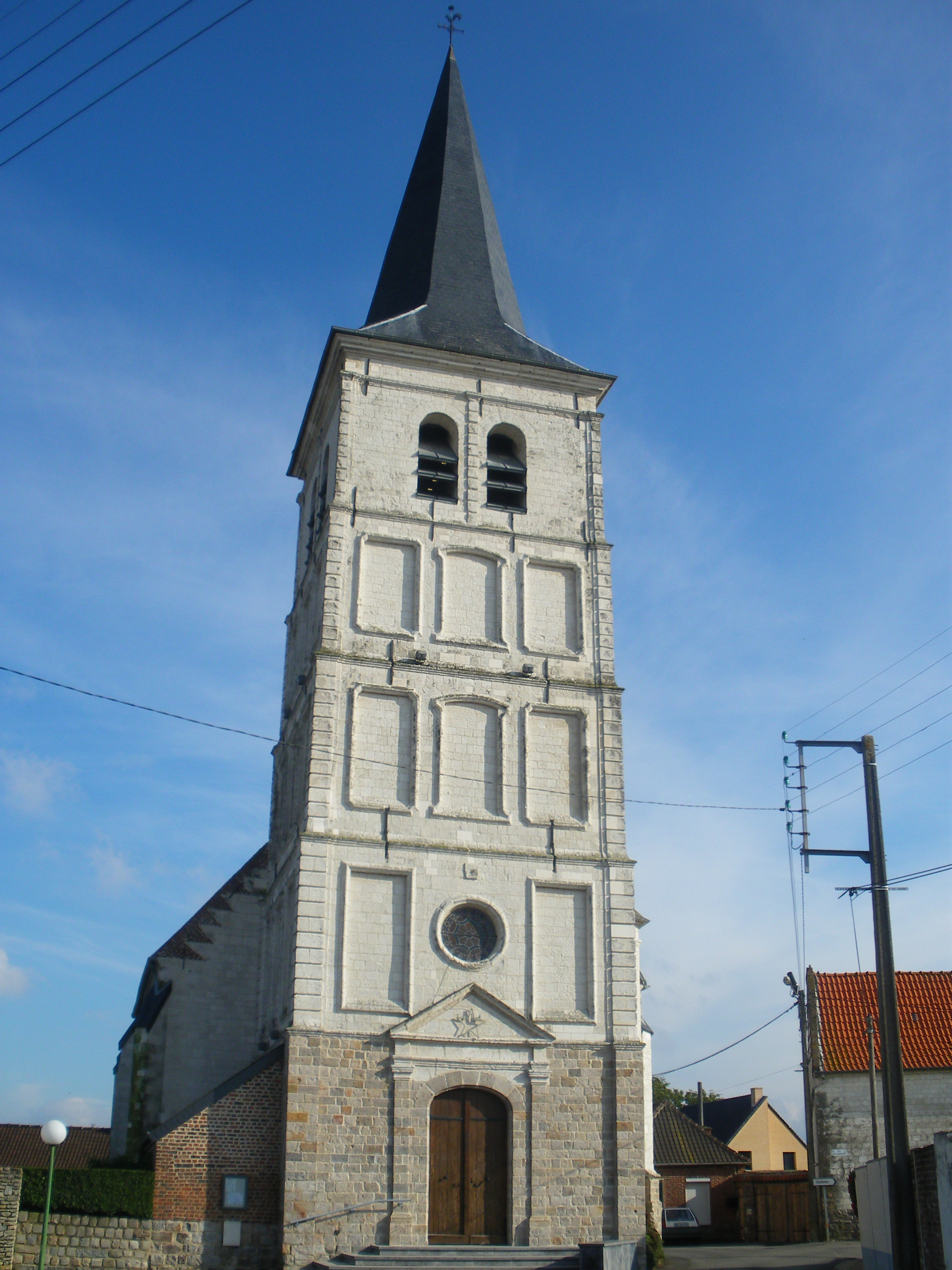
- The church of Houchin

- Coat of arms
- Location of Houchin
- Location within France Location within Hauts-de-France
- Coordinates: 50°29′00″N 2°37′23″E
- Country: France
- Region: Hauts-de-France
- Department: Pas-de-Calais
- Arrondissement: Béthune
- Canton: Nœux-les-Mines
- Intercommunality: CA Béthune-Bruay, Artois-Lys Romane

Government
  - Mayor (2020–2026): Maurice Leconte
- Area^{1}: 4.5 km^{2} (1.7 sq mi)
- Elevation: 75 m (246 ft)
- Highest elevation: 76 m (249 ft)
- Lowest elevation: 37 m (121 ft)
- Population (2023): 738
  - Density: 160/km^{2} (420/sq mi)
- Time zone: UTC+01:00 (CET)
  - Summer (DST): UTC+02:00 (CEST)
- INSEE/Postal code: 62456 /62620
- ^{1} French Land Register data, which excludes lakes, ponds, glaciers > 1 km^{2} (0.386 sq mi or 247 acres) and river estuaries.

Houchin (French pronunciation: [uʃɛ̃]) is a commune in the Pas-de-Calais department in the Hauts-de-France region of France about 3 miles (4.8 km) south of Béthune.

The name is first attested as Hucin in 1104.

== Population ==
Historical population
Year	Pop.	±% p.a.
1968	690	—
1975	644	−0.98%
1982	625	−0.43%
1990	664	+0.76%
1999	683	+0.31%
2007	713	+0.54%
2012	698	−0.42%
2017	718	+0.57%
2023	738	+0.46%
Source: INSEE

== See also ==
- Communes of the Pas-de-Calais department
