= Canton of Nœux-les-Mines =

Coordinates: 50°30′05″N 2°40′46″E

The Canton of Nœux-les-Mines is one of the 39 cantons of the Pas-de-Calais department, in northern France. At the French canton reorganisation which came into effect in March 2015, the canton was expanded from 4 to 13 communes.

It consists of the following communes:

1. Barlin
2. Drouvin-le-Marais
3. Fouquereuil
4. Fouquières-lès-Béthune
5. Gosnay
6. Haillicourt
7. Hersin-Coupigny
8. Hesdigneul-lès-Béthune
9. Houchin
10. Labourse
11. Nœux-les-Mines
12. Ruitz
13. Vaudricourt
