= Drouvin-le-Marais =

- Commune
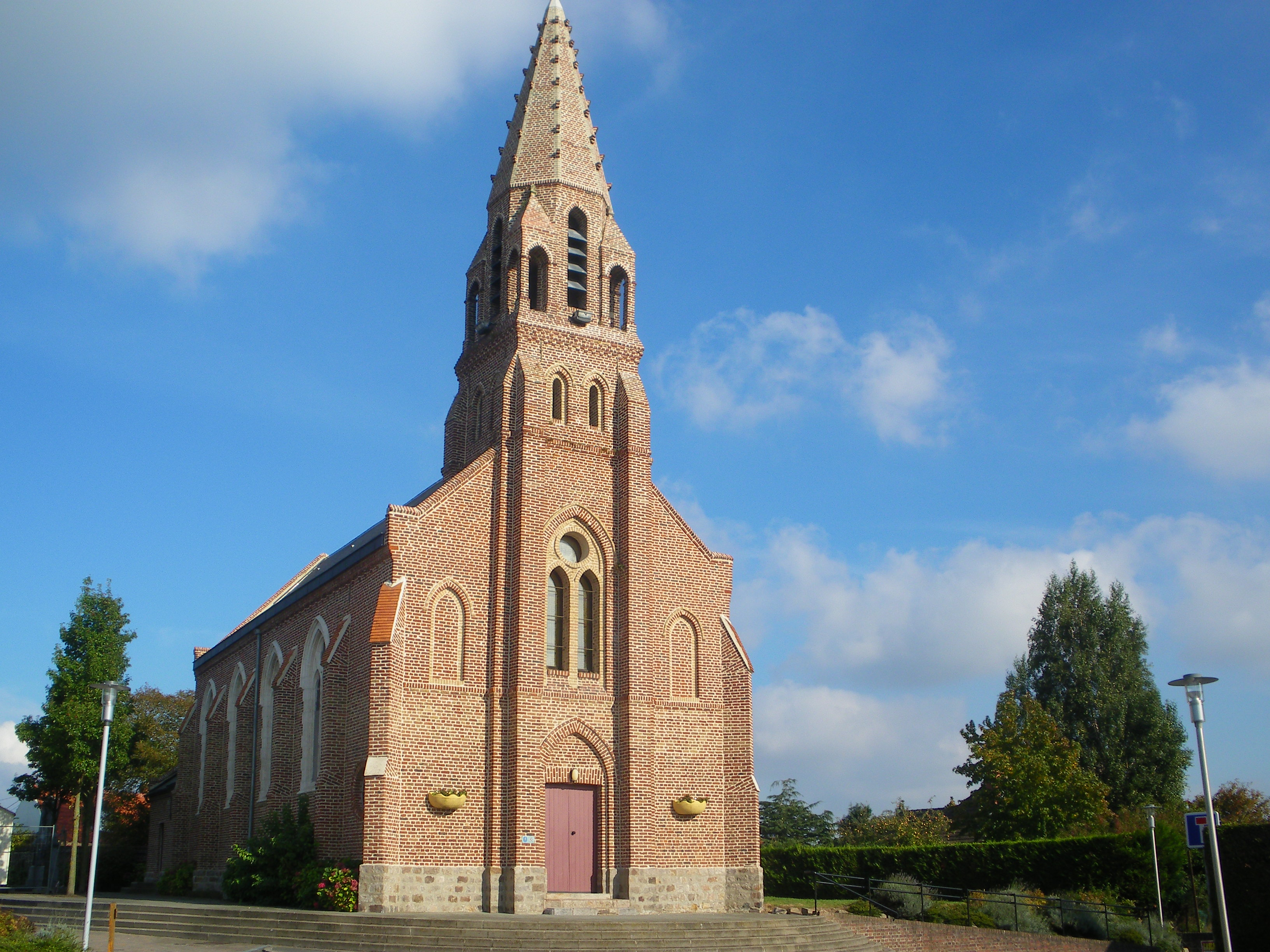
- The church of Drouvin-le-Marais

- Coat of arms
- Location of Drouvin-le-Marais
- Location within France Location within Hauts-de-France
- Coordinates: 50°29′41″N 2°37′48″E
- Country: France
- Region: Hauts-de-France
- Department: Pas-de-Calais
- Arrondissement: Béthune
- Canton: Nœux-les-Mines
- Intercommunality: CA Béthune-Bruay, Artois-Lys Romane

Government
  - Mayor (2020–2026): Catherine Decourcelle
- Area^{1}: 2.12 km^{2} (0.82 sq mi)
- Elevation: 51 m (167 ft)
- Highest elevation: 58 m (190 ft)
- Lowest elevation: 34 m (112 ft)
- Population (2023): 622
  - Density: 293/km^{2} (760/sq mi)
- Time zone: UTC+01:00 (CET)
  - Summer (DST): UTC+02:00 (CEST)
- INSEE/Postal code: 62278 /62131
- ^{1} French Land Register data, which excludes lakes, ponds, glaciers > 1 km^{2} (0.386 sq mi or 247 acres) and river estuaries.

Drouvin-le-Marais (French pronunciation: [dʁuvɛ̃ lə maʁɛ]) is a commune in the Pas-de-Calais department in the Hauts-de-France region of France.

== Geography ==
A farming village some 3 miles (4.8 km) south of Béthune and 28 miles (45 km) southwest of Lille, at the junction of the D171 and the D72 roads.

== Population ==
Historical population
Year	Pop.	±% p.a.
1968	354	—
1975	334	−0.83%
1982	344	+0.42%
1990	383	+1.35%
1999	404	+0.59%
2007	519	+3.18%
2012	555	+1.35%
2017	594	+1.37%
2023	622	+0.77%
Source: INSEE

== Places of interest ==
- The church of St.Pierre, dating from the nineteenth century.

== See also ==
- Communes of the Pas-de-Calais department
