= Vaudricourt, Pas-de-Calais =

Vaudricourt
- Commune
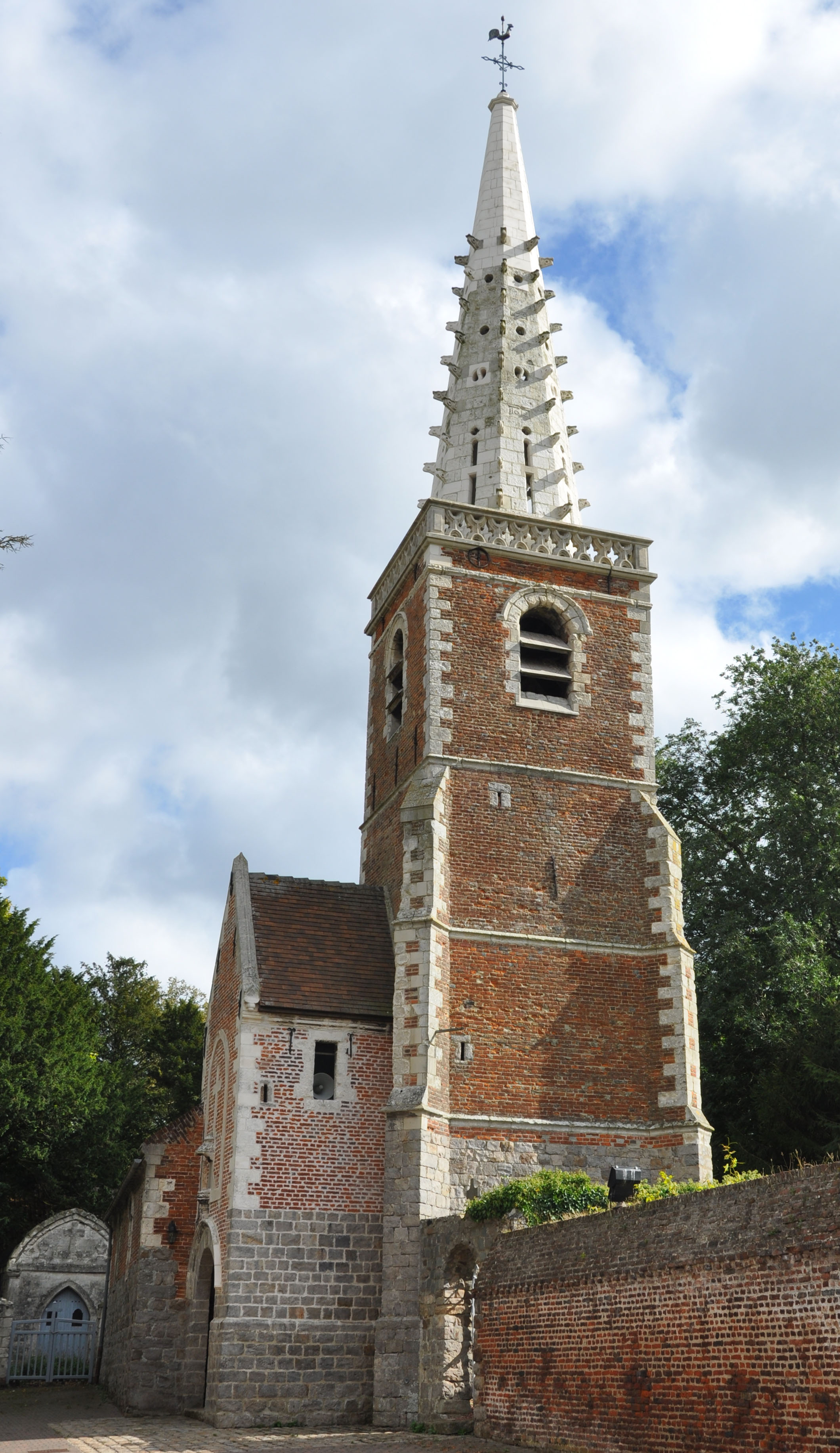
- The church of Vaudricourt
- Location of Vaudricourt
- Location within France Location within Hauts-de-France
- Coordinates: 50°30′09″N 2°37′33″E
- Country: France
- Region: Hauts-de-France
- Department: Pas-de-Calais
- Arrondissement: Béthune
- Canton: Nœux-les-Mines
- Intercommunality: CA Béthune-Bruay, Artois-Lys Romane

Government
  - Mayor (2020–2026): Jean-François Jurczyk
- Area^{1}: 2.99 km^{2} (1.15 sq mi)
- Elevation: 45 m (148 ft)
- Highest elevation: 52 m (171 ft)
- Lowest elevation: 29 m (95 ft)
- Population (2023): 1,138
  - Density: 381/km^{2} (986/sq mi)
- Time zone: UTC+01:00 (CET)
  - Summer (DST): UTC+02:00 (CEST)
- INSEE/Postal code: 62836 /62131
- ^{1} French Land Register data, which excludes lakes, ponds, glaciers > 1 km^{2} (0.386 sq mi or 247 acres) and river estuaries.

Vaudricourt (French pronunciation: [vodʁikuʁ]) is a commune in the Pas-de-Calais department in the Hauts-de-France region of France.

== Geography ==
Vaudricourt is situated some 2 miles (3.2 km) south of Béthune and 25 miles (40 km) southwest of Lille, at the junction of the D186 and D171 roads and by junction 6 of the A26 autoroute.

== Population ==
Historical population
Year	Pop.	±% p.a.
1968	454	—
1975	668	+5.67%
1982	897	+4.30%
1990	863	−0.48%
1999	867	+0.05%
2007	890	+0.33%
2012	876	−0.32%
2017	971	+2.08%
2023	1,138	+2.68%
Source: INSEE

== Places of interest ==
- The church of Notre-Dame, dating from the thirteenth century.
- The nineteenth-century chateau.
- A war memorial.

== See also ==
- Communes of the Pas-de-Calais department
