= Fouquières-lès-Béthune =

- Commune
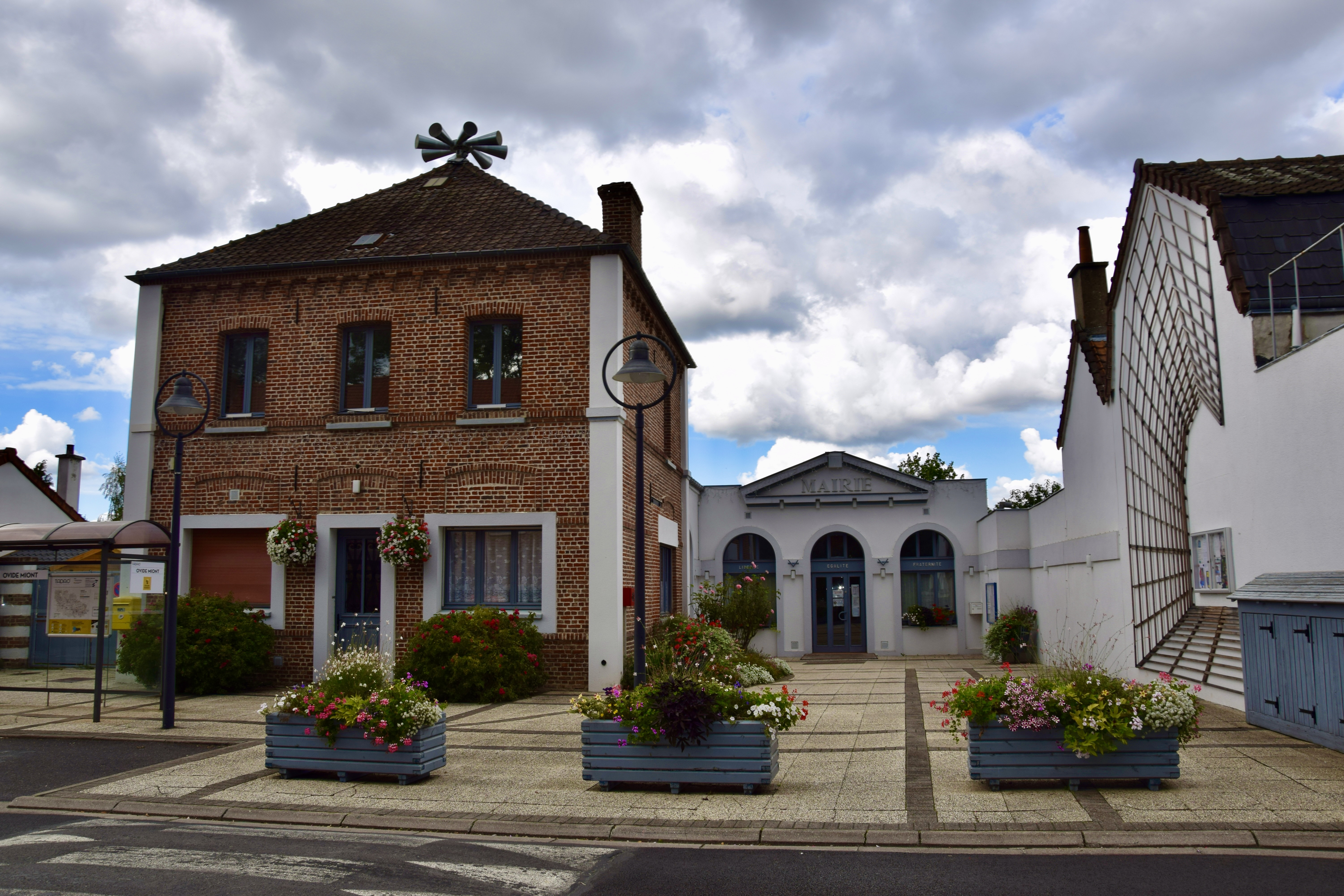
- The town hall of Fouquières-lès-Béthune

- Coat of arms
- Location of Fouquières-lès-Béthune
- Location within France Location within Hauts-de-France
- Coordinates: 50°30′56″N 2°36′42″E
- Country: France
- Region: Hauts-de-France
- Department: Pas-de-Calais
- Arrondissement: Béthune
- Canton: Nœux-les-Mines
- Intercommunality: CA Béthune-Bruay, Artois-Lys Romane

Government
  - Mayor (2021–2026): Sophie Duby
- Area^{1}: 2.42 km^{2} (0.93 sq mi)
- Elevation: 26 m (85 ft)
- Highest elevation: 49 m (161 ft)
- Lowest elevation: 23 m (75 ft)
- Population (2023): 1,108
  - Density: 458/km^{2} (1,190/sq mi)
- Time zone: UTC+01:00 (CET)
  - Summer (DST): UTC+02:00 (CEST)
- INSEE/Postal code: 62350 /62232
- ^{1} French Land Register data, which excludes lakes, ponds, glaciers > 1 km^{2} (0.386 sq mi or 247 acres) and river estuaries.

Fouquières-lès-Béthune (French pronunciation: [fukjɛʁ lɛ betyn], literally Fouquières near Béthune) is a commune in the Pas-de-Calais department in the Hauts-de-France region of France.

== Geography ==
A farming and light industrial village suburb situated just 1 mile (1.6 km) southwest of Béthune and 30 miles (48 km) southwest of Lille, at the junction of the D181, N41 and the N43 roads. The A26 autoroute passes by, just yards from the commune.

== Population ==
Historical population
| Year | Pop. | ±% p.a. |
|---|---|---|
| 1968 | 540 | — |
| 1975 | 1,029 | +9.65% |
| 1982 | 952 | −1.10% |
| 1990 | 1,168 | +2.59% |
| 1999 | 1,133 | −0.34% |
| 2007 | 1,100 | −0.37% |
| 2012 | 1,078 | −0.40% |
| 2017 | 1,060 | −0.34% |
| 2023 | 1,108 | +0.74% |
Source: INSEE

== Places of interest ==
- The church of St.Vaast, dating from the eighteenth century.
- An old manorhouse and an old farmhouse.
- Three nineteenth century chateaux.
- The Commonwealth War Graves Commission cemetery.

== See also ==
- Communes of the Pas-de-Calais department
