= Haillicourt =

- Commune
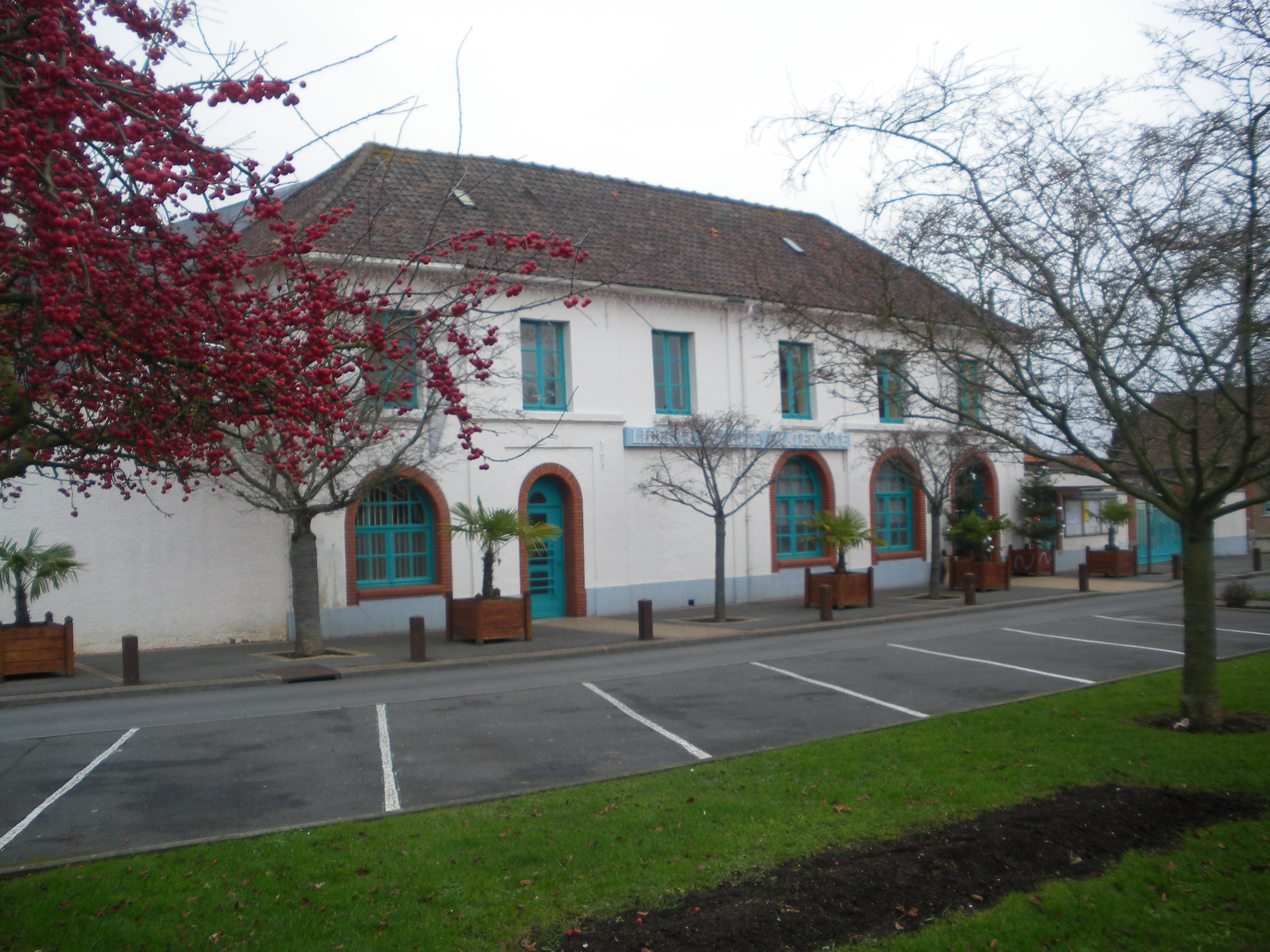
- The town hall of Haillicourt

- Coat of arms
- Location of Haillicourt
- Location within France Location within Hauts-de-France
- Coordinates: 50°28′36″N 2°35′06″E
- Country: France
- Region: Hauts-de-France
- Department: Pas-de-Calais
- Arrondissement: Béthune
- Canton: Nœux-les-Mines
- Intercommunality: CA Béthune-Bruay, Artois-Lys Romane

Government
  - Mayor (2022–2026): Gregory Foucault
- Area^{1}: 4.46 km^{2} (1.72 sq mi)
- Elevation: 70 m (230 ft)
- Highest elevation: 93 m (305 ft)
- Lowest elevation: 39 m (128 ft)
- Population (2023): 5,064
  - Density: 1,140/km^{2} (2,940/sq mi)
- Time zone: UTC+01:00 (CET)
  - Summer (DST): UTC+02:00 (CEST)
- INSEE/Postal code: 62400 /62940
- ^{1} French Land Register data, which excludes lakes, ponds, glaciers > 1 km^{2} (0.386 sq mi or 247 acres) and river estuaries.

Haillicourt (French pronunciation: [ajikuʁ]) is a commune in the Pas-de-Calais department in the Hauts-de-France region of France.

== Geography ==
A former coal-mining town, now a light industrial and farming commune, situated some 6 miles (9.7 km) south of Béthune and 32 miles (51 km) southwest of Lille, at the junction of the D188 and the D86 roads.

== Population ==
Historical population
Year	Pop.	±% p.a.
1968	6,089	—
1975	5,517	−1.40%
1982	5,370	−0.39%
1990	5,151	−0.52%
1999	5,007	−0.31%
2007	4,963	−0.11%
2012	4,974	+0.04%
2017	4,886	−0.36%
2023	5,064	+0.60%
Source: INSEE

== Places of interest ==
- Farmhouses and a dovecote dating from the seventeenth century.
- The church of Notre-Dame, dating from the sixteenth century.

== See also ==
- Communes of the Pas-de-Calais department
