= Gosnay =

- Commune
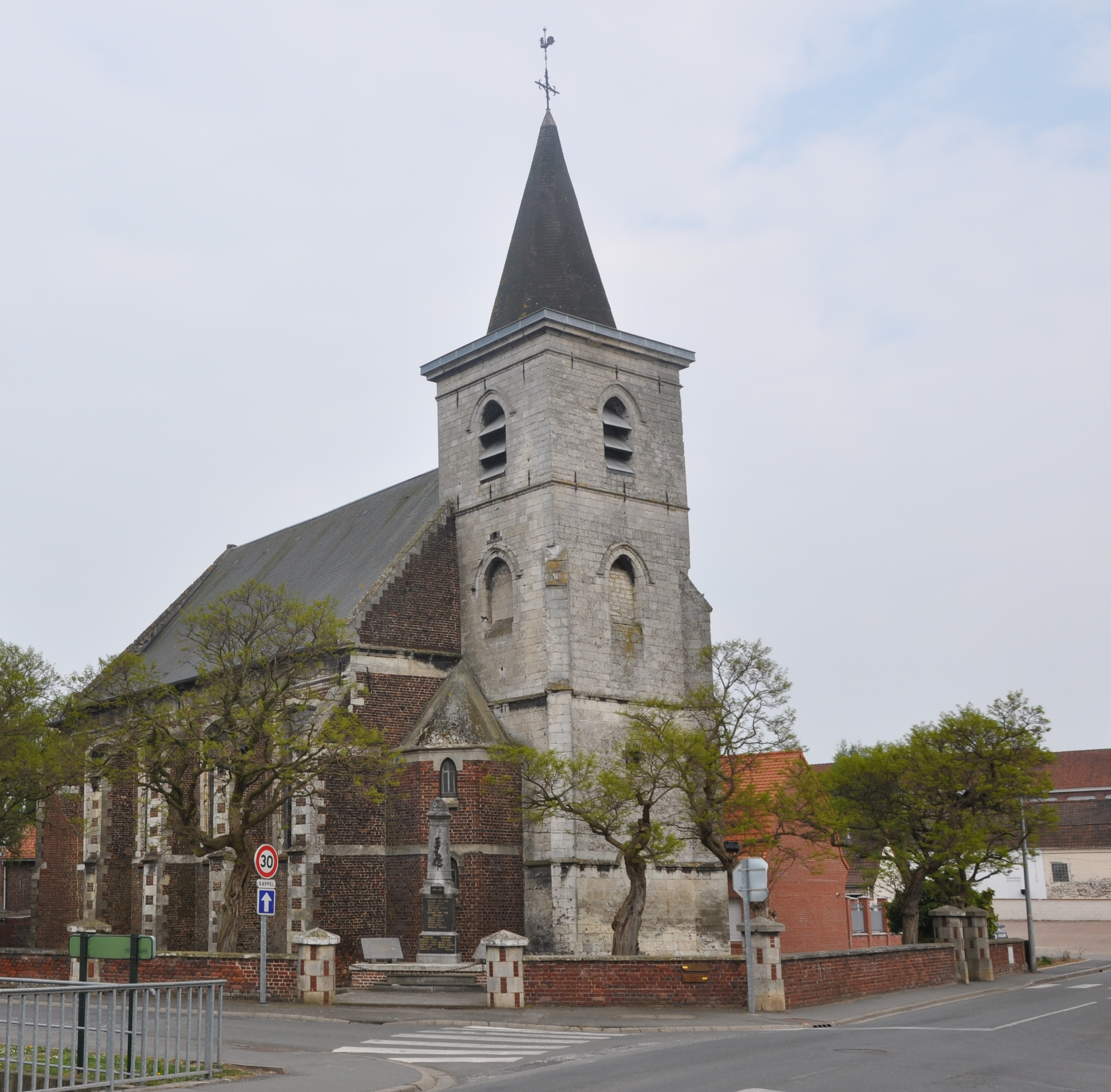
- The church of Gosnay

- Coat of arms
- Location of Gosnay
- Location within France Location within Hauts-de-France
- Coordinates: 50°30′29″N 2°35′15″E
- Country: France
- Region: Hauts-de-France
- Department: Pas-de-Calais
- Arrondissement: Béthune
- Canton: Nœux-les-Mines
- Intercommunality: CA Béthune-Bruay, Artois-Lys Romane

Government
  - Mayor (2020–2026): Virginie Souilliart
- Area^{1}: 2.21 km^{2} (0.85 sq mi)
- Elevation: 29 m (95 ft)
- Highest elevation: 61 m (200 ft)
- Lowest elevation: 25 m (82 ft)
- Population (2023): 941
  - Density: 426/km^{2} (1,100/sq mi)
- Time zone: UTC+01:00 (CET)
  - Summer (DST): UTC+02:00 (CEST)
- INSEE/Postal code: 62377 /62199
- ^{1} French Land Register data, which excludes lakes, ponds, glaciers > 1 km^{2} (0.386 sq mi or 247 acres) and river estuaries.

Gosnay (French pronunciation: [ɡonɛ]) is a commune in the Pas-de-Calais department in the Hauts-de-France region of France about 2 miles (3.2 km) southwest of Béthune and 25 miles (40 km) southwest of Lille.

== Population ==
Historical population
Year	Pop.	±% p.a.
1968	1,388	—
1975	1,297	−0.96%
1982	1,178	−1.37%
1990	1,226	+0.50%
1999	1,195	−0.28%
2007	1,078	−1.28%
2012	990	−1.69%
2017	951	−0.80%
2023	941	−0.18%
Source: INSEE

== See also ==
- Communes of the Pas-de-Calais department
