= Hesdigneul-lès-Béthune =

- Commune
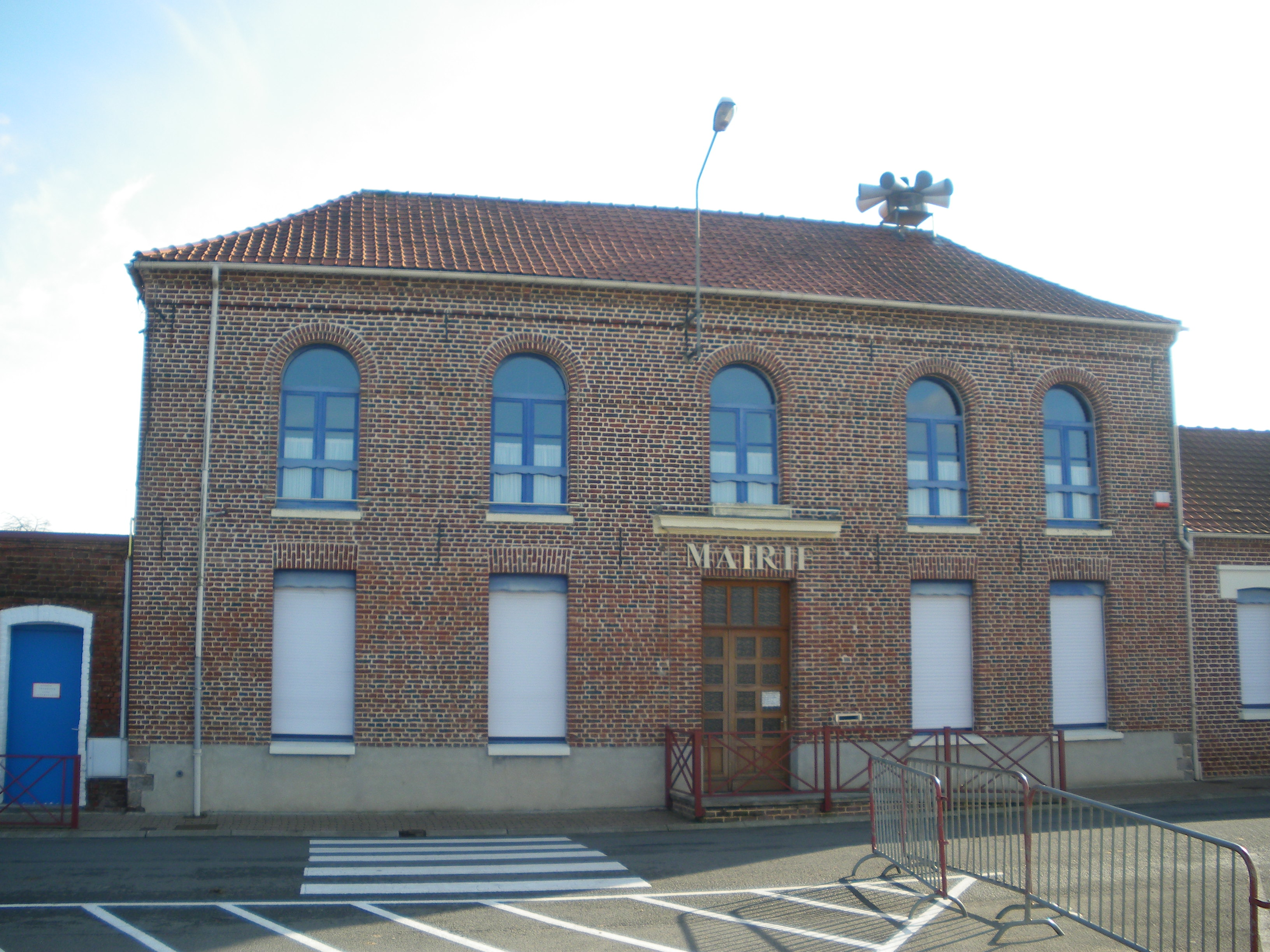
- The town hall of Hesdigneul-lès-Béthune

- Coat of arms
- Location of Hesdigneul-lès-Béthune
- Location within France Location within Hauts-de-France
- Coordinates: 50°30′07″N 2°35′31″E
- Country: France
- Region: Hauts-de-France
- Department: Pas-de-Calais
- Arrondissement: Béthune
- Canton: Nœux-les-Mines
- Intercommunality: CA Béthune-Bruay, Artois-Lys Romane

Government
  - Mayor (2020–2026): Maurice Lecomte
- Area^{1}: 2.59 km^{2} (1.00 sq mi)
- Elevation: 115 m (377 ft)
- Highest elevation: 61 m (200 ft)
- Lowest elevation: 32 m (105 ft)
- Population (2023): 828
  - Density: 320/km^{2} (828/sq mi)
- Time zone: UTC+01:00 (CET)
  - Summer (DST): UTC+02:00 (CEST)
- INSEE/Postal code: 62445 /62196
- ^{1} French Land Register data, which excludes lakes, ponds, glaciers > 1 km^{2} (0.386 sq mi or 247 acres) and river estuaries.

Hesdigneul-lès-Béthune (French pronunciation: [ediɲœl lɛ betyn], literally Hesdigneul near Béthune; Picard: Hédignu-lès-Bétheune) is a commune in the Pas-de-Calais department in the Hauts-de-France region of France.

== Geography ==
A small farming village, situated some 3 miles (4.8 km) southwest of Béthune at the junction of the D181 and the D941 roads and one mile from junction 6 of the A26 autoroute.

== Population ==
Historical population
| Year | Pop. | ±% p.a. |
|---|---|---|
| 1968 | 898 | — |
| 1975 | 843 | −0.90% |
| 1982 | 759 | −1.49% |
| 1990 | 791 | +0.52% |
| 1999 | 771 | −0.28% |
| 2007 | 818 | +0.74% |
| 2012 | 825 | +0.17% |
| 2017 | 822 | −0.07% |
| 2023 | 828 | +0.12% |
Source: INSEE

== Places of interest ==
- The church of St. Denis, dating from the sixteenth century.
- The vestiges of an eighteenth-century chateau and its outbuildings.

== See also ==
- Communes of the Pas-de-Calais department
