= Nœux-les-Mines =

- Commune
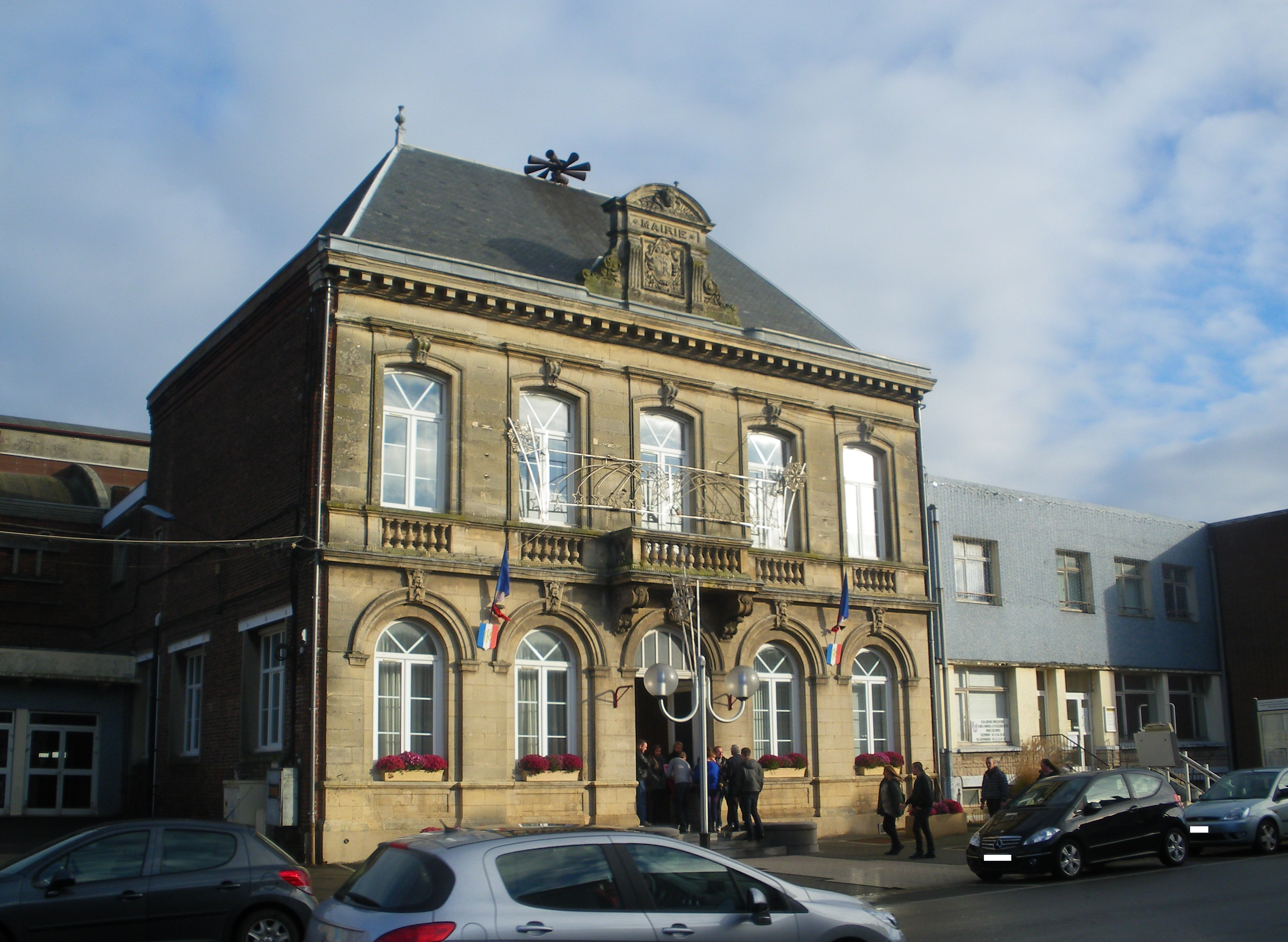
- The town hall of Nœux-les-Mines

- Coat of arms
- Location of Nœux-les-Mines
- Location within France Location within Hauts-de-France
- Coordinates: 50°28′49″N 2°39′56″E
- Country: France
- Region: Hauts-de-France
- Department: Pas-de-Calais
- Arrondissement: Béthune
- Canton: Nœux-les-Mines
- Intercommunality: CA Béthune-Bruay, Artois-Lys Romane

Government
  - Mayor (2020–2026): Serge Marcellak
- Area^{1}: 8.84 km^{2} (3.41 sq mi)
- Highest elevation: 76 m (249 ft)
- Lowest elevation: 23 m (75 ft)
- Population (2023): 11,590
  - Density: 1,310/km^{2} (3,400/sq mi)
- Time zone: UTC+01:00 (CET)
  - Summer (DST): UTC+02:00 (CEST)
- INSEE/Postal code: 62617 /62290
- ^{1} French Land Register data, which excludes lakes, ponds, glaciers > 1 km^{2} (0.386 sq mi or 247 acres) and river estuaries.

Nœux-les-Mines (French pronunciation: [nø le min]) is a commune in the Pas-de-Calais department in the Hauts-de-France region of France.

== Geography ==
Nœux-les-Mines is situated some 4 miles (6.4 km) south of Béthune and 25 miles (40 km) southwest of Lille, at the junction of the D937 and D65 roads. As the name of the town itself might imply, it was established as a coal mining centre, however with the decline of the mining industry in the area Nœux-les-Mines has evolved to become a light industrial and farming town.

== History ==
Nœux-les-Mines was first recorded in the 4th century as Vitri. It was destroyed in 882 by the Normans, before being rebuilt in the 10th century, when it became known as Noewe.

It was part of the small province of Gohelle, itself part of the province of Artois.

== Population ==
Historical population
Year	Pop.	±% p.a.
1968	13,325	—
1975	13,567	+0.26%
1982	13,166	−0.43%
1990	12,351	−0.80%
1999	11,966	−0.35%
2007	12,190	+0.23%
2012	12,300	+0.18%
2017	12,074	−0.37%
2023	11,590	−0.68%
Source: INSEE

== Notable people ==
- Footballer Raymond Kopa
- Rally driver Stéphane Lefebvre

== Twin towns ==
- (France) La Clusaz, Haute-Savoie, in the French Alps.

== See also ==
- Communes of the Pas-de-Calais department
