= Labourse =

- Commune
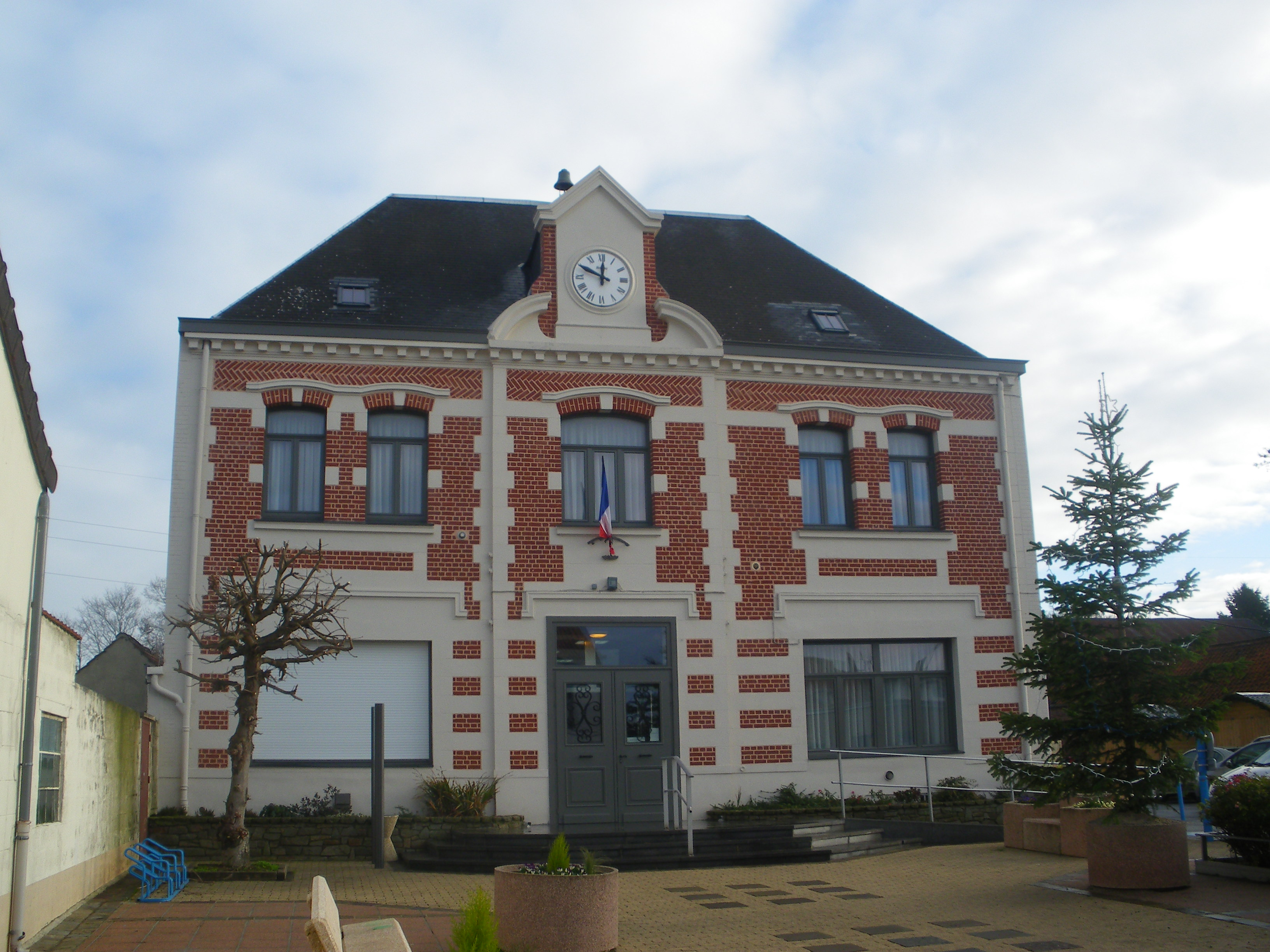
- The town hall of Labourse

- Coat of arms
- Location of Labourse
- Location within France Location within Hauts-de-France
- Coordinates: 50°29′56″N 2°40′51″E
- Country: France
- Region: Hauts-de-France
- Department: Pas-de-Calais
- Arrondissement: Béthune
- Canton: Nœux-les-Mines
- Intercommunality: CA Béthune-Bruay, Artois-Lys Romane

Government
  - Mayor (2020–2026): Philippe Scaillierez
- Area^{1}: 4.7 km^{2} (1.8 sq mi)
- Elevation: 25 m (82 ft)
- Highest elevation: 44 m (144 ft)
- Lowest elevation: 18 m (59 ft)
- Population (2023): 2,858
  - Density: 610/km^{2} (1,600/sq mi)
- Time zone: UTC+01:00 (CET)
  - Summer (DST): UTC+02:00 (CEST)
- INSEE/Postal code: 62480 /62113
- ^{1} French Land Register data, which excludes lakes, ponds, glaciers > 1 km^{2} (0.386 sq mi or 247 acres) and river estuaries.

Labourse (French pronunciation: [labuʁs]) is a commune in the Pas-de-Calais department in the Hauts-de-France region of France.

== Geography ==
A large farming and light industrial village, situated some 3 miles (4.8 km) southeast of Béthune and 22 miles (35 km) southwest of Lille on the D65 and the D943. The commune is also traversed by the A26 autoroute.

== Population ==
Historical population
Year	Pop.	±% p.a.
1968	2,201	—
1975	1,926	−1.89%
1982	1,711	−1.68%
1990	2,057	+2.33%
1999	2,028	−0.16%
2007	2,188	+0.95%
2012	2,429	+2.11%
2017	2,847	+3.23%
2023	2,858	+0.06%
Source: INSEE

== Places of interest ==
- A nineteenth-century chateau.
- The church of St. Martin, rebuilt in the 16th century.
- The chapel, rebuilt, along with most of the village, after World War I.
- A museum, telling of the deportations of World War II.

== See also ==
- Communes of the Pas-de-Calais department
