= Canton of Le Parcq =

Coordinates: 50.38000°N 2.10111°E

Le Parcq
- Former canton
- Interactive map of Le Parcq
- Country: France
- Region: Hauts-de-France
- Department: Pas-de-Calais
- No. of communes: {{{nbcomm}}}
- Disbanded: 2015
- Area: 167.04 km^{2} (64.49 sq mi)
- Population (2012): 7,658
  - Density: 45.85/km^{2} (118.7/sq mi)

The Canton du Parcq is a former canton situated in the Pas-de-Calais département and in the Nord-Pas-de-Calais region of France. It was disbanded following the French canton reorganisation which came into effect in March 2015. It consisted of 24 communes, which joined the canton of Auxi-le-Château in 2015. It had a total of 7,658 inhabitants (2012).

== Geography ==
This canton is centred on the village of Le Parcq in the arrondissement of Montreuil. The altitude varies from 25 m at (Grigny) to 142 m at (Azincourt) for an average of 72 m.

The canton comprised 24 communes:

- Auchy-lès-Hesdin
- Azincourt
- Béalencourt
- Blangy-sur-Ternoise
- Blingel
- Éclimeux
- Fillièvres
- Fresnoy
- Galametz
- Grigny
- Incourt
- Maisoncelle
- Neulette
- Noyelles-lès-Humières
- Le Parcq
- Le Quesnoy-en-Artois
- Rollancourt
- Saint-Georges
- Tramecourt
- Vacqueriette-Erquières
- Vieil-Hesdin
- Wail
- Wamin
- Willeman

== Population ==
Population Growth
1962	1968	1975	1982	1990	1999	2012
7623	8003	7820	7784	7487	7501	7658
Census count starting from 1962 : Population without double counting

== See also ==
- Arrondissement of Montreuil
- Cantons of Pas-de-Calais
- Communes of Pas-de-Calais
