= Ternoise =

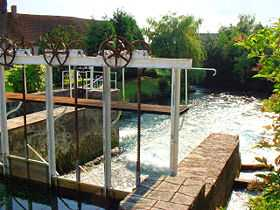

- Location within France Location within Hauts-de-France

Location
- Country: France

Physical characteristics
- Source
  - location: Pas-de-Calais
- Mouth
  - location: Canche
  - coordinates: 50°22′53″N 2°0′41″E
- Length: 41.4 km (25.7 mi)
- Basin size: 342 km^{2} (132 mi^{2})
- Discharge
  - average: 4.45 m^{3}/s (157 cu ft/s)

Basin features
- Progression: Canche→ English Channel

The river Ternoise (French pronunciation: [tɛʁnwaz]; Dutch: Ternaas) is one of the small chalk streams that flow from the plateau of the southern Boulonnais and Picardy, via the Canche, into the English Channel. The basin of the Ternoise extends to 342 square kilometres (132 mi^{2}) and lies in the southern end of the département of Pas-de-Calais. It is one of the rivers of the Seven Valleys tourist area. Its name, and that of the region Ternois, is derived from the Frankish pagus Teruanensis.

== Geography ==
The 41.4-kilometre (25.7 mi) long river rises at Ligny-Saint-Flochel and passes through Saint-Pol-sur-Ternoise to join the river Canche at Huby-Saint-Leu, near to the town of Hesdin.

== Towns and villages along the course ==
The Ternoise flows through the following places (all within the Pas-de-Calais department):

- Ligny-Saint-Flochel, Roëllecourt, Saint-Michel-sur-Ternoise, Saint-Pol-sur-Ternoise, Gauchin-Verloingt, Hernicourt, Wavrans-sur-Ternoise, Monchy-Cayeux, Anvin, Teneur, Érin, Tilly-Capelle, Blangy-sur-Ternoise, Blingel, Rollancourt, Auchy-lès-Hesdin, Le Parcq, Grigny and Huby-Saint-Leu.

== Tributaries ==
The Faux and the Eps are the only principal watercourses joining the Ternoise.

== Hydrological Information ==
The Ternoise is a very uniform river. Seasonal flow fluctuations are not very marked, similar to the Canche or the Somme, its neighbours. The higher water flows occur at the end of winter and in the spring. Average flows vary between 3.44 m³ per second in September to 5.36 m³ per second in March.

== Gallery ==
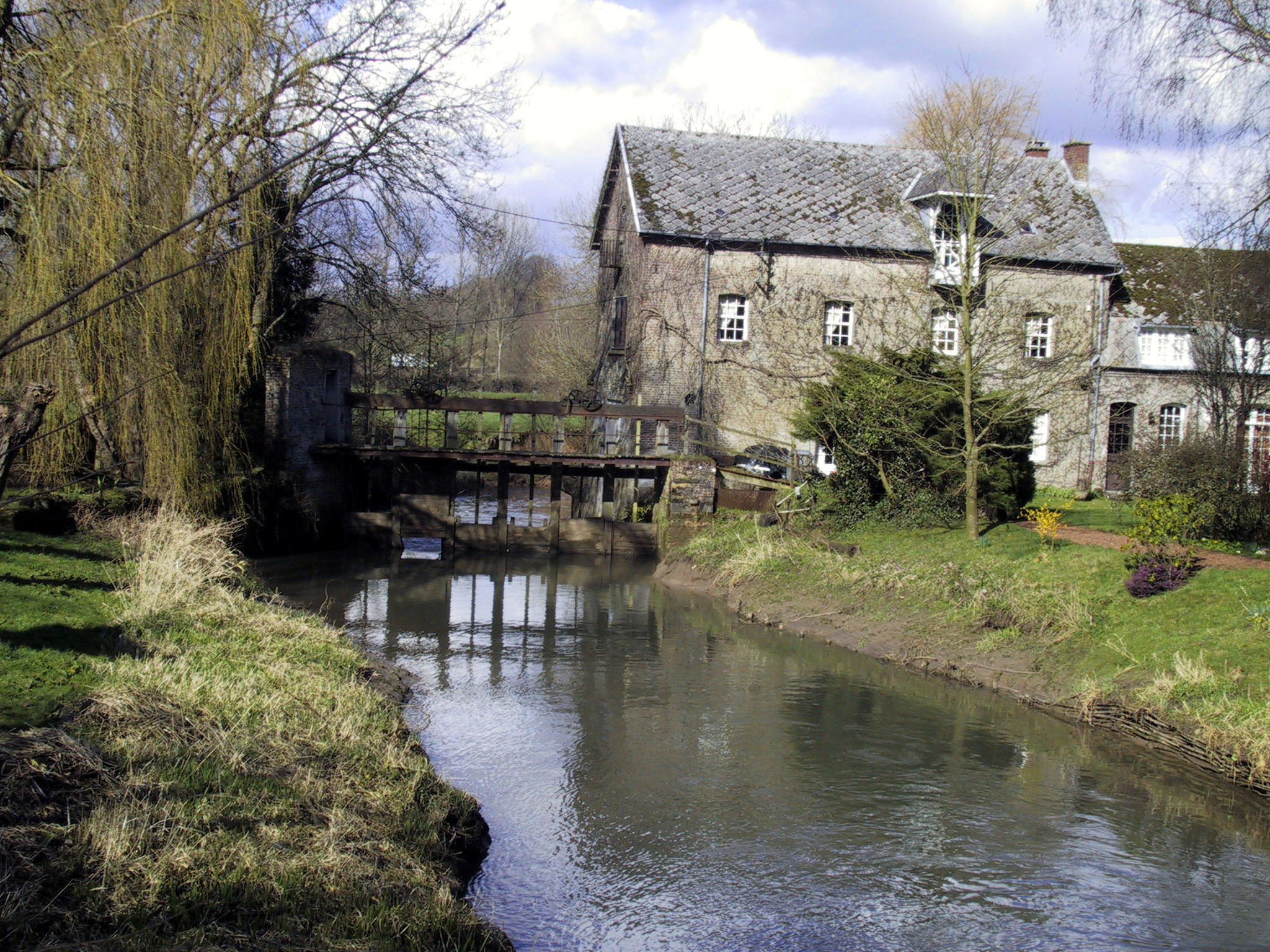
The Ternoise at Hernicourt

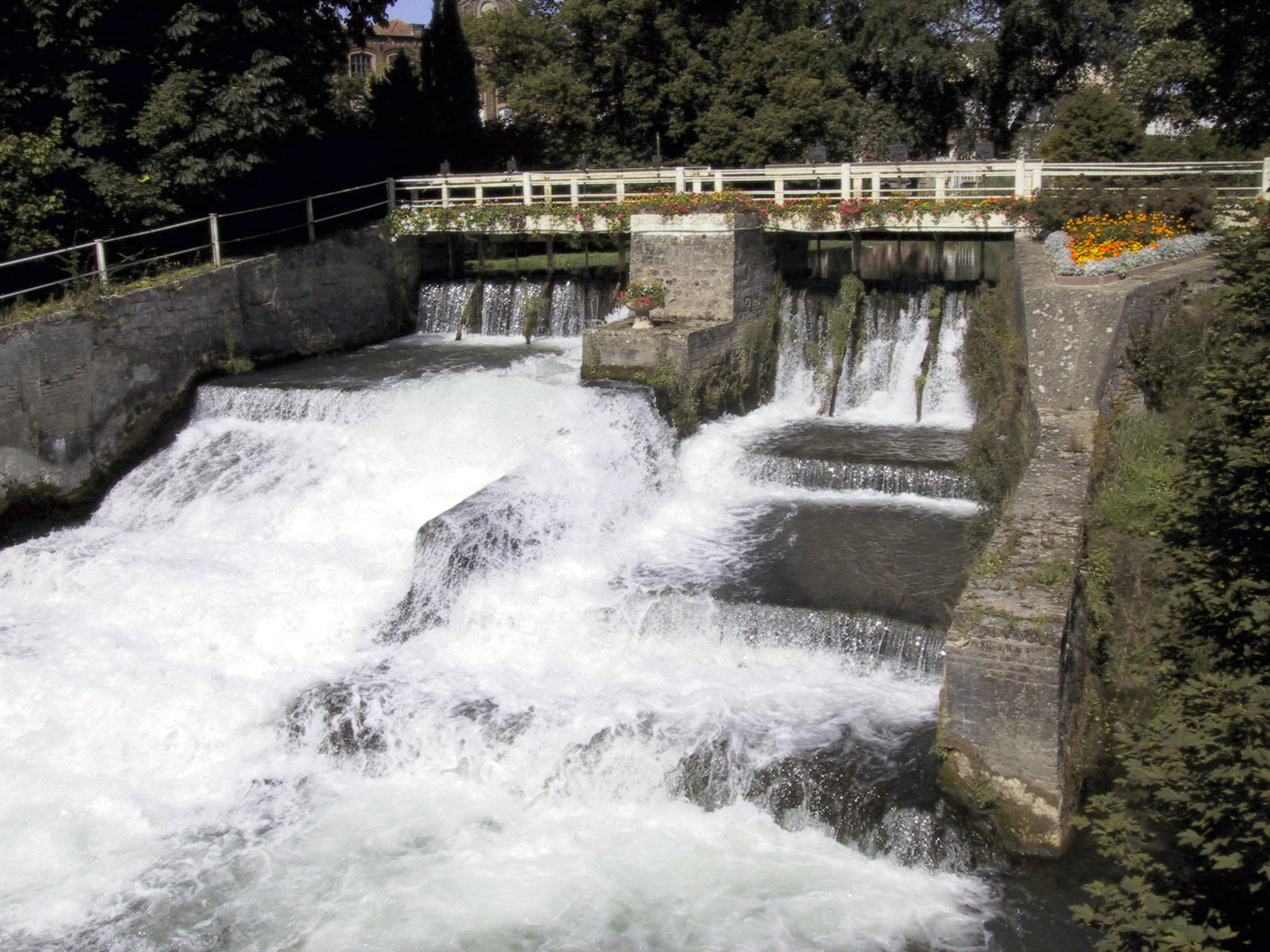
The Ternoise at Auchy-lès-Hesdin

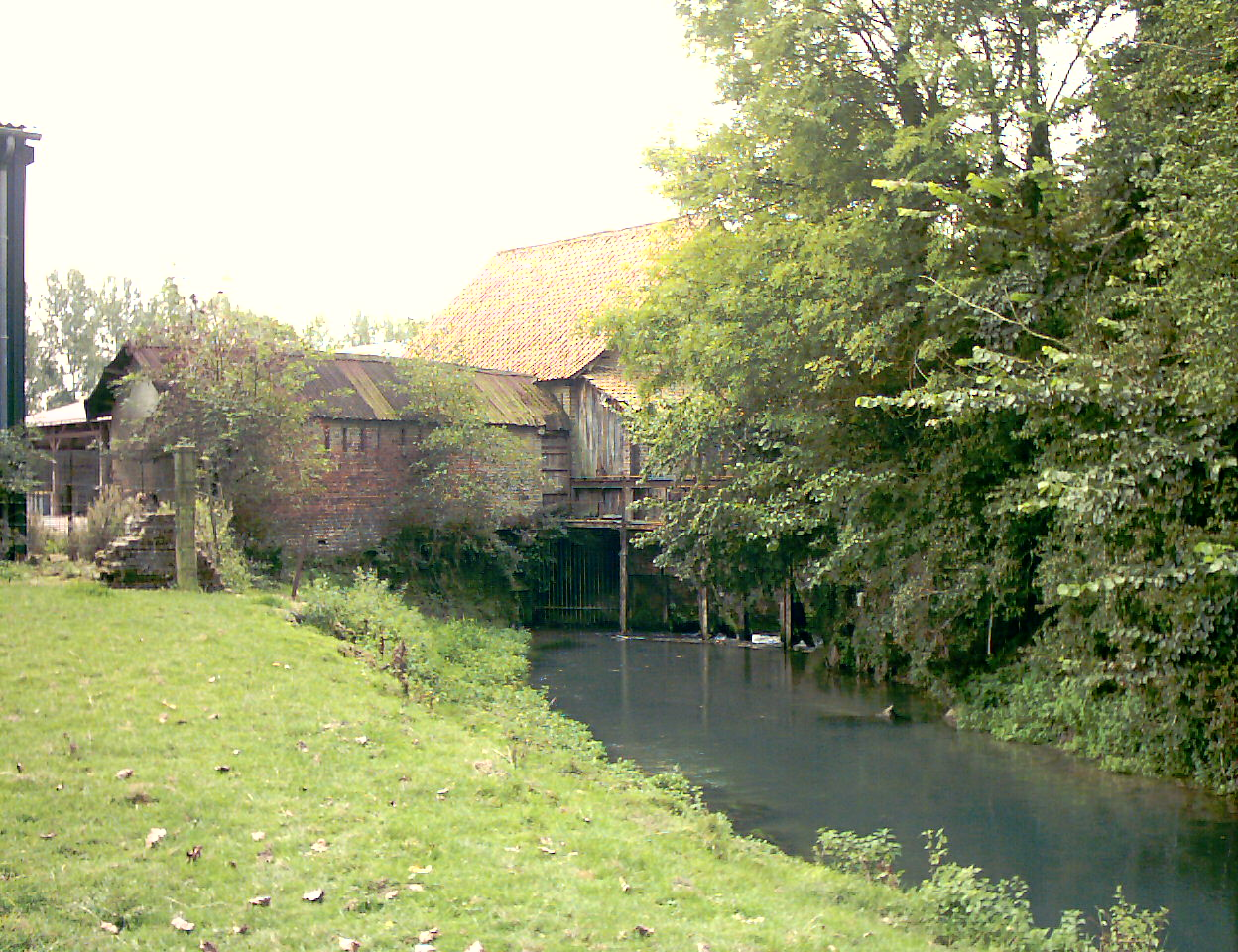
The Ternoise at Anvin

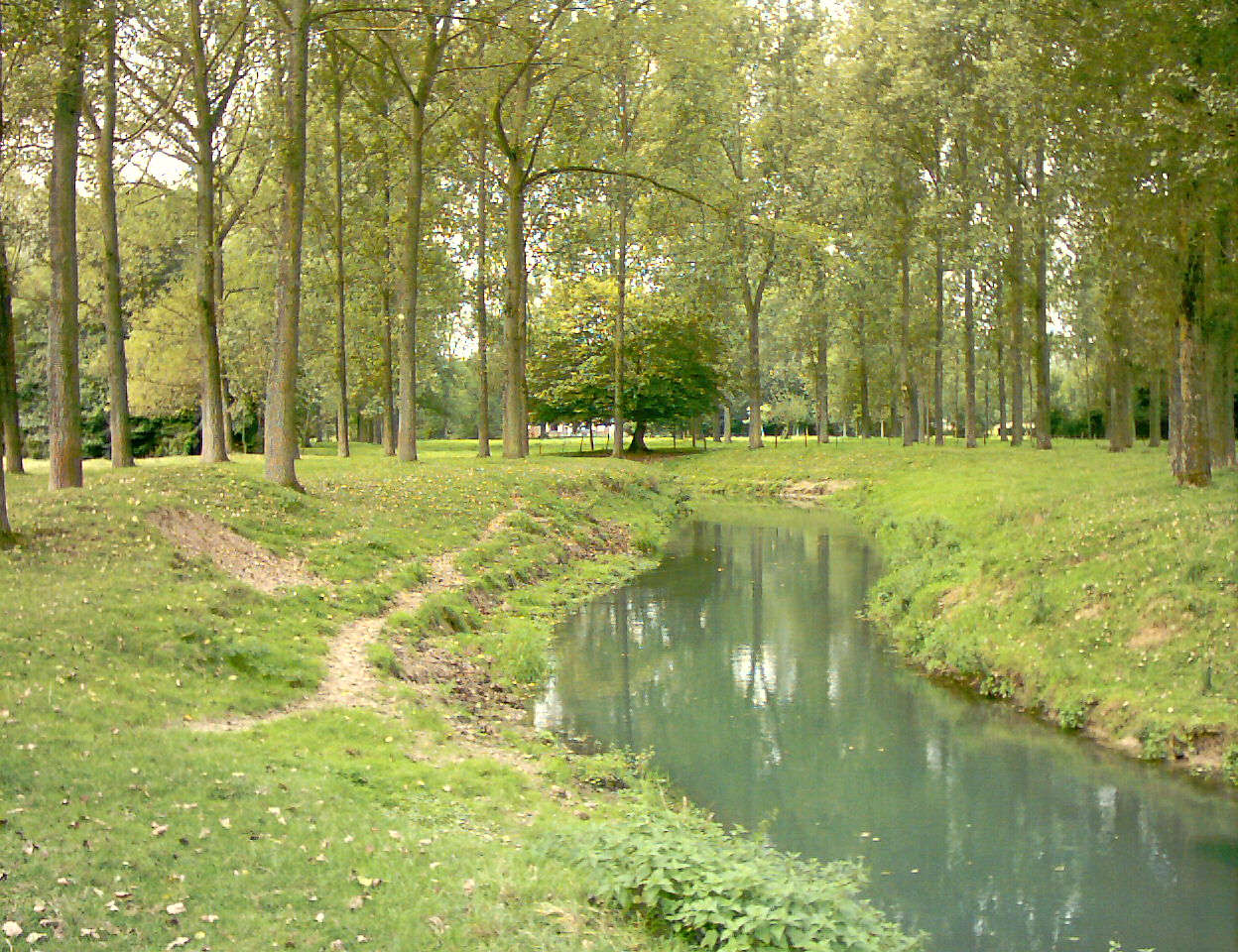
At Anvin, further upstream

== See also ==
- Schéma directeur d'aménagement et de gestion des eaux
