= Le Parcq =

- Commune
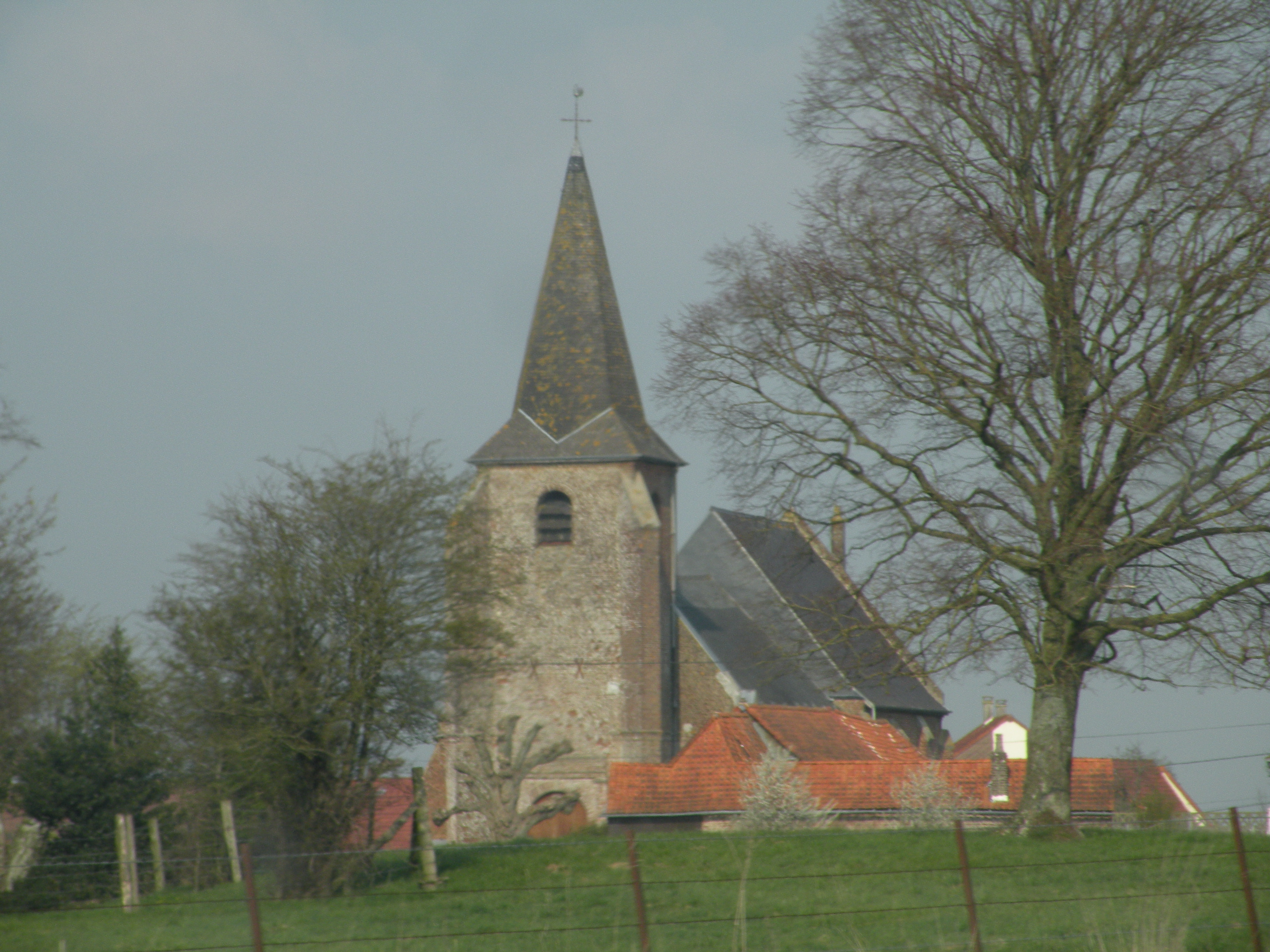
- The church of Le Parcq

- Coat of arms
- Location of Le Parcq
- Location within France Location within Hauts-de-France
- Coordinates: 50°22′48″N 2°06′04″E
- Country: France
- Region: Hauts-de-France
- Department: Pas-de-Calais
- Arrondissement: Montreuil
- Canton: Auxi-le-Château
- Intercommunality: CC des 7 Vallées

Government
  - Mayor (2020–2026): Gérard Vandenhove
- Area^{1}: 9.27 km^{2} (3.58 sq mi)
- Elevation: 115 m (377 ft)
- Highest elevation: 113 m (371 ft)
- Lowest elevation: 27 m (89 ft)
- Population (2023): 740
  - Density: 80/km^{2} (210/sq mi)
- Time zone: UTC+01:00 (CET)
  - Summer (DST): UTC+02:00 (CEST)
- INSEE/Postal code: 62647 /62770
- ^{1} French Land Register data, which excludes lakes, ponds, glaciers > 1 km^{2} (0.386 sq mi or 247 acres) and river estuaries.

Le Parcq (French pronunciation: [lə paʁk]) is a commune in the Pas-de-Calais department in the Hauts-de-France region of France about 18 miles (29 km) southeast of Montreuil-sur-Mer, in the valley of the Ternoise river.

== Administration ==
On 1 January 2007, Le Parcq became part of the arrondissement of Montreuil, with the other communes of the then canton of Le Parcq. Previously, Le Parcq was in the arrondissement of Arras. At the French canton reorganisation which came into effect in March 2015, the canton of Le Parcq was disbanded and its communes became part of the canton of Auxi-le-Château.

== Population ==
Historical population
Year	Pop.	±% p.a.
1968	604	—
1975	586	−0.43%
1982	570	−0.39%
1990	633	+1.32%
1999	702	+1.16%
2007	754	+0.90%
2012	798	+1.14%
2017	776	−0.56%
2023	740	−0.79%
Source: INSEE

== See also ==
- Communes of the Pas-de-Calais department
