= Saint-Michel-sur-Ternoise =

- Commune
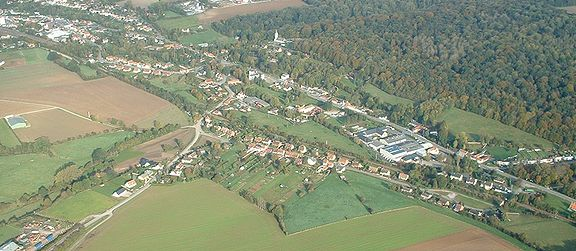
- An aerial view of Saint-Michel-sur-Ternoise

- Coat of arms
- Location of Saint-Michel-sur-Ternoise
- Location within France Location within Hauts-de-France
- Coordinates: 50°22′34″N 2°21′44″E
- Country: France
- Region: Hauts-de-France
- Department: Pas-de-Calais
- Arrondissement: Arras
- Canton: Saint-Pol-sur-Ternoise
- Intercommunality: CC Ternois

Government
  - Mayor (2020–2026): Fabienne Deligniere
- Area^{1}: 5.97 km^{2} (2.31 sq mi)
- Elevation: 90 m (300 ft)
- Highest elevation: 147 m (482 ft)
- Lowest elevation: 87 m (285 ft)
- Population (2023): 826
  - Density: 138/km^{2} (358/sq mi)
- Time zone: UTC+01:00 (CET)
  - Summer (DST): UTC+02:00 (CEST)
- INSEE/Postal code: 62763 /62130
- ^{1} French Land Register data, which excludes lakes, ponds, glaciers > 1 km^{2} (0.386 sq mi or 247 acres) and river estuaries.

Saint-Michel-sur-Ternoise (French pronunciation: [sɛ̃ miʃɛl syʁ tɛʁnwaz], literally Saint-Michel on Ternoise) is a commune in the Pas-de-Calais department in the Hauts-de-France region of France.

== Geography ==
Saint-Michel-sur-Ternoise is an eastern suburb of Saint-Pol-sur-Ternoise, on the banks of the Ternoise river, some 24 miles (39 km) west of Arras, at the junction of the D8 and D85 roads.

== Population ==
Historical population
Year	Pop.	±% p.a.
1968	783	—
1975	935	+2.57%
1982	933	−0.03%
1990	926	−0.09%
1999	943	+0.20%
2007	932	−0.15%
2012	916	−0.35%
2017	878	−0.84%
2023	826	−1.01%
Source: INSEE

== Places of interest ==
- The church of St.Michel, dating from the sixteenth century.

== See also ==
Communes of the Pas-de-Calais department
