= Hernicourt =

- Commune
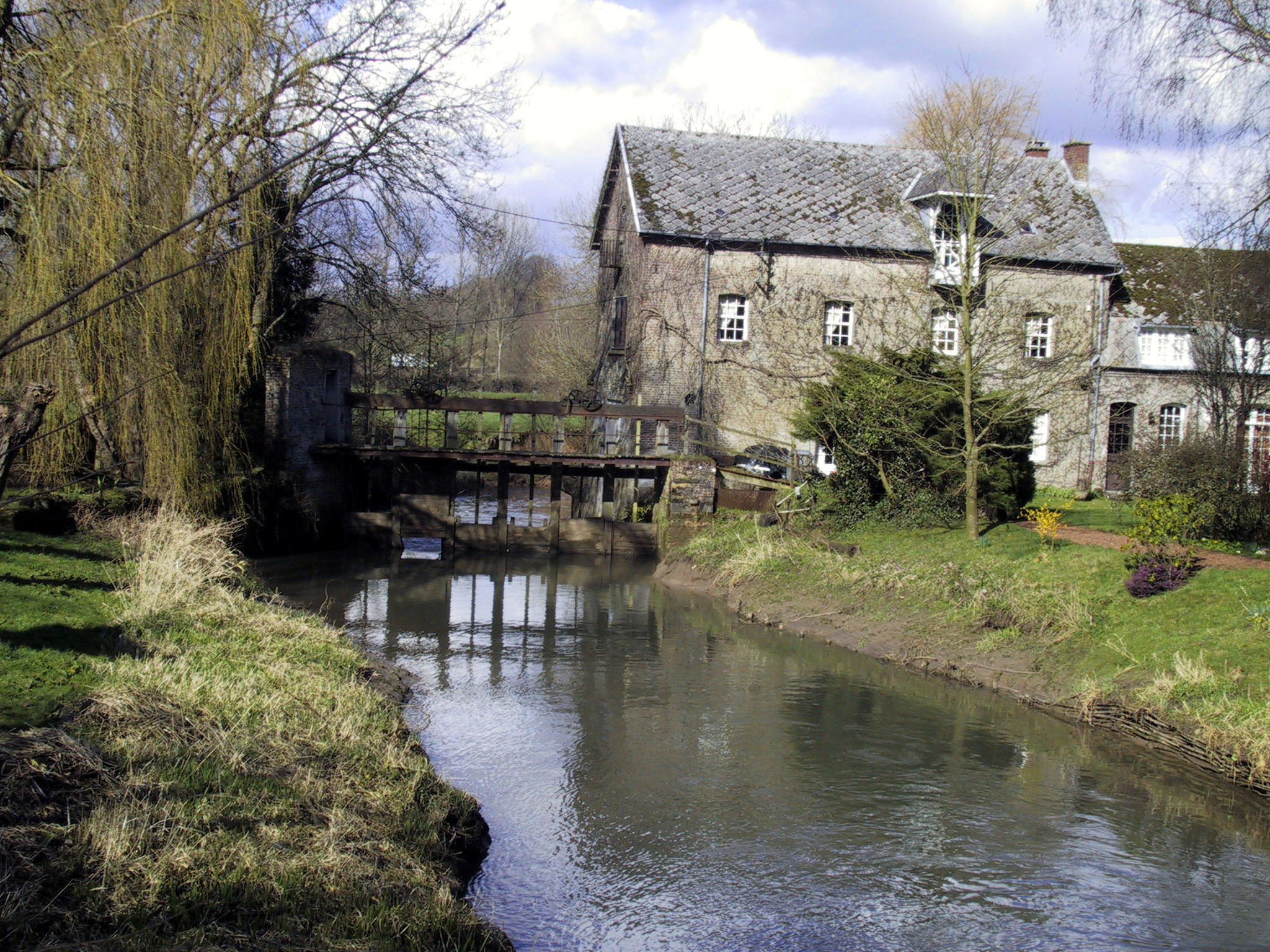
- The Ternoise at Hernicourt

- Coat of arms
- Location of Hernicourt
- Location within France Location within Hauts-de-France
- Coordinates: 50°24′21″N 2°18′27″E
- Country: France
- Region: Hauts-de-France
- Department: Pas-de-Calais
- Arrondissement: Arras
- Canton: Saint-Pol-sur-Ternoise
- Intercommunality: CC Ternois

Government
  - Mayor (2020–2026): Lionel Boitel
- Area^{1}: 9.85 km^{2} (3.80 sq mi)
- Elevation: 73 m (240 ft)
- Highest elevation: 149 m (489 ft)
- Lowest elevation: 65 m (213 ft)
- Population (2023): 512
  - Density: 52.0/km^{2} (135/sq mi)
- Time zone: UTC+01:00 (CET)
  - Summer (DST): UTC+02:00 (CEST)
- INSEE/Postal code: 62442 /62130
- ^{1} French Land Register data, which excludes lakes, ponds, glaciers > 1 km^{2} (0.386 sq mi or 247 acres) and river estuaries.

Hernicourt (French pronunciation: [ɛʁnikuʁ]; Picard: Harnicourt) is a commune in the Pas-de-Calais department in the Hauts-de-France region of France.

== Geography ==
A commune made up of three farming villages (Sautricourt, St.Martin and Hernicourt) that surround the neighbouring commune of Wavrans-sur-Ternoise. Situated 2.5 miles (4 km) north of St.Pol and 24 miles (39 km) northwest of Arras, on the D99 and the D343 roads.

== Population ==
Historical population
Year	Pop.	±% p.a.
1968	373	—
1975	378	+0.19%
1982	395	+0.63%
1990	416	+0.65%
1999	423	+0.19%
2007	451	+0.80%
2012	527	+3.16%
2017	567	+1.47%
2023	512	−1.69%
Source: INSEE

== Places of interest ==
- The church of St.Vaast at Hernicourt, rebuilt in the 19th century.
- The medieval church of St.Martin.
- Evidence of an old castle at Sautricourt.
- A watermill.

== See also ==
- Communes of the Pas-de-Calais department
