= Grigny =

Grigny may refer to:

== People ==
- Nicolas de Grigny (1672–1703), French Baroque organist and composer

== Places ==
Grigny is the name or part of the name of several communes in France:

- Grigny, Pas-de-Calais
- Grigny-sur-Rhône, on the outskirts of Lyon
- Grigny, Essonne
