= Château de Beaurepaire =

Château in Hauts-de-France, France

Coordinates: 46.66718°N 5.38260°E

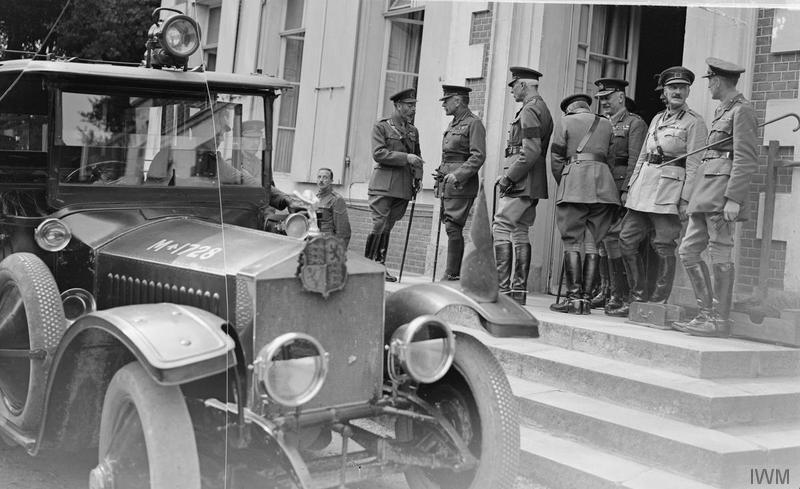
Douglas Haig welcomes King George V.

Château de Beaurepaire is a château on the D138 road between Montreuil and Campagne-les-Hesdin in the Pas-de-Calais, France.

It housed the British Expeditionary Force's General Headquarters during World War I from April 1916 to April 1919, and was the headquarters in this period of its commander, Douglas Haig.
