= Citadel of Montreuil-sur-Mer =

Royal citadel in Montreuil-sur-Mer, France

Coordinates: 50.4670°N 1.7597°E

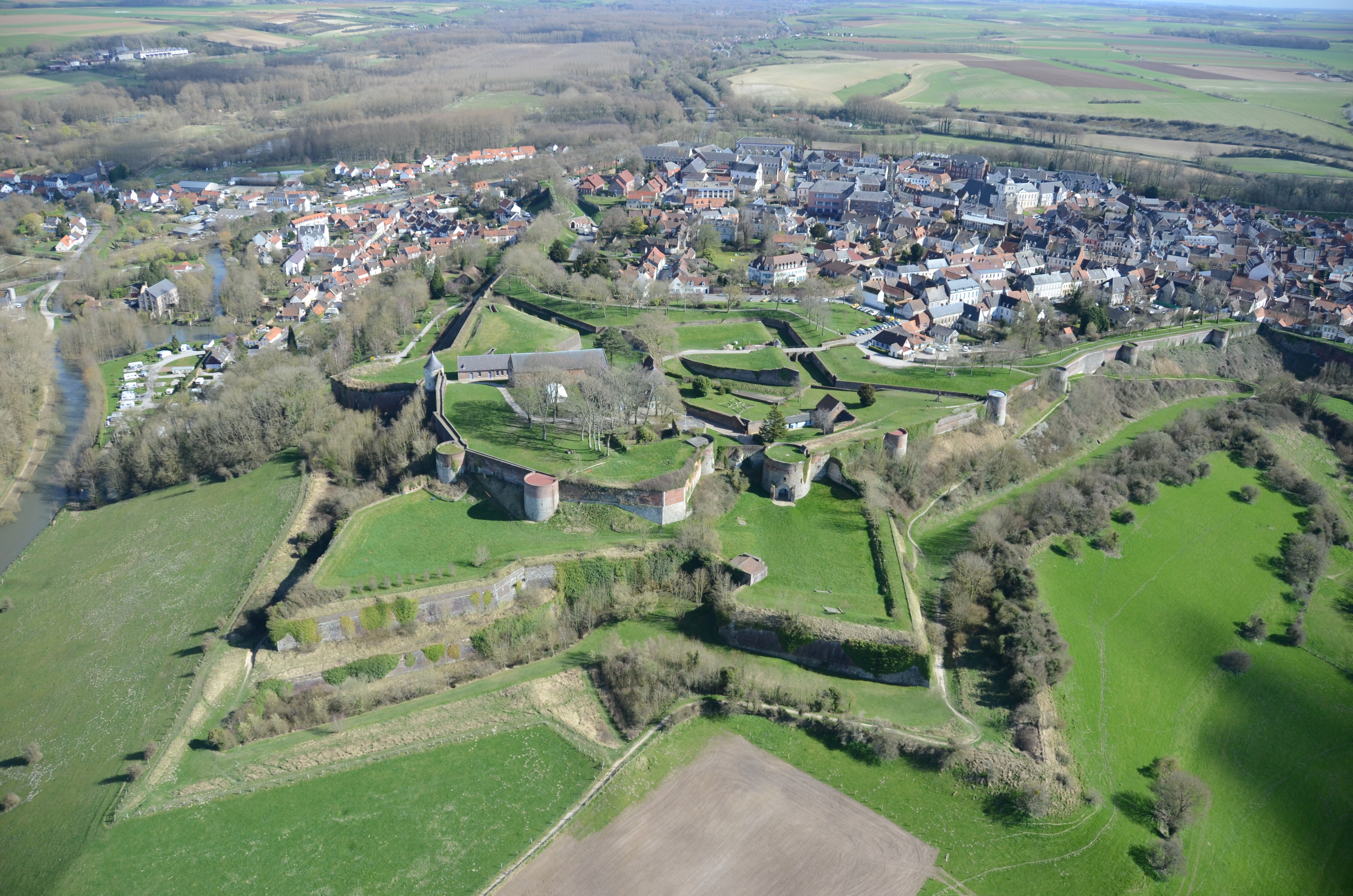
Aerial view of the citadel

The citadel of Montreuil-sur-Mer is a 16th-century pre-Vauban French royal citadel located in Montreuil-sur-Mer in the Pas-de-Calais department in northern France. Built on the foundations of a medieval royal castle, it was listed as a historical monument on December 18, 1926.

The citadel is a separate defensive redoubt within the fortified town walls, the ramparts of which had been listed as historical monuments on September 10, 1913. Between 2016 and 2022, volunteers from the Chantiers histoire et architecture médiévales association participated in the citadel's restoration.

Parts of the structure can be dated to the 13th, 15th and 17th centuries. An underground structure was built at the site by the occupying German forces during World War II.
