= Nicolas Aubriot =

French professional football player (born 1984)

Personal information
- Date of birth: 27 September 1984 (age 42)
- Place of birth: Saint-Pol-sur-Ternoise, France
- Height: 1.68 m (5 ft 6 in)
- Position: Defender

Team information
- Current team: AS Cherbourg
- Number: 14

Senior career*
Years	Team	Apps	(Gls)
2001–2004	Lille (B team)		
2004–2007	FC Gueugnon	39	(0)
2007–	AS Cherbourg		
- * Club domestic league appearances and goals as of 13:39, 30 November 2009 (UTC)

Nicolas Aubriot (born 27 September 1984) is a French professional football player. Currently, he plays in the Championnat National for AS Cherbourg Football.

He played on the professional level in Ligue 2 for FC Gueugnon.
