= Rollancourt =

- Commune
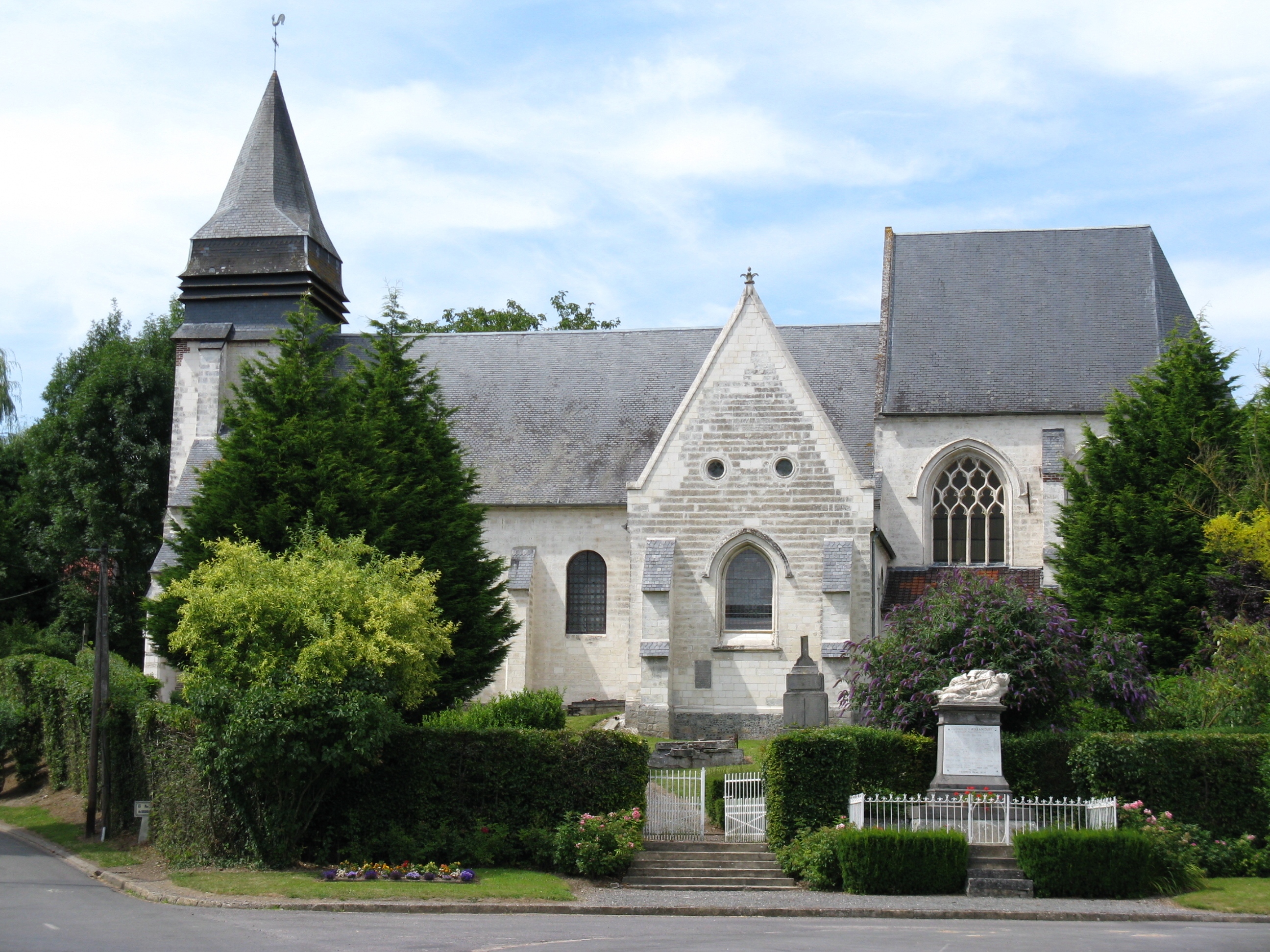
- The church of Rollancourt

- Coat of arms
- Location of Rollancourt
- Location within France Location within Hauts-de-France
- Coordinates: 50°24′31″N 2°07′24″E
- Country: France
- Region: Hauts-de-France
- Department: Pas-de-Calais
- Arrondissement: Montreuil
- Canton: Auxi-le-Château
- Intercommunality: CC des 7 Vallées

Government
  - Mayor (2020–2026): Alain Carlier
- Area^{1}: 11.59 km^{2} (4.47 sq mi)
- Elevation: 35 m (115 ft)
- Highest elevation: 116 m (381 ft)
- Lowest elevation: 30 m (98 ft)
- Population (2023): 293
  - Density: 25.3/km^{2} (65.5/sq mi)
- Time zone: UTC+01:00 (CET)
  - Summer (DST): UTC+02:00 (CEST)
- INSEE/Postal code: 62719 /62770
- ^{1} French Land Register data, which excludes lakes, ponds, glaciers > 1 km^{2} (0.386 sq mi or 247 acres) and river estuaries.

Rollancourt (French pronunciation: [ʁɔlɑ̃kuʁ]) is a commune in the Pas-de-Calais department in the Hauts-de-France region of France.

== Geography ==
Rollancourt is located 18 miles (28 km) southeast of Montreuil-sur-Mer on the D107 road, in the valley of the Ternoise river.

== Population ==
Historical population
Year	Pop.	±% p.a.
1968	304	—
1975	311	+0.33%
1982	321	+0.45%
1990	276	−1.87%
1999	301	+0.97%
2007	394	+3.42%
2012	321	−4.02%
2017	307	−0.89%
2023	293	−0.77%
Source: INSEE

== Places of interest ==
- The church of St.Riquier, dating from the fifteenth century.
- The Manoir de Courcelles, XIIth, XVIth and XVIIIth centuries
- A Louis XV château.
- Traces of an ancient château.

== See also ==
- Communes of the Pas-de-Calais department
