= Bertha of Artois =

Abbess
- Born: c. mid 7th century Artois
- Died: 4 July 725; Blangy-sur-Ternoise (near Lille), département of Pas-de-Calais, Nord-Pas de Calais, France
- Venerated in: Roman Catholic Church
- Canonized: Pre-Congregation
- Feast: 4 July
- Attributes: a nun kneeling before an altar with her daughter
- Patronage: widows

Bertha of Artois or Bertha of Blangy (mid 7th century – 4 July 725) was a Frankish and Anglo-Saxon Abbess of noble blood.

== Life ==
Bertha was the daughter of Count Rigobert, the Mayor of the Palace under King Clovis II prior to Ebroin. Her mother, Ursana, was the daughter of the King of Kent (in England).

At the age of twenty Bertha married Siegfried or Sigfrid, a relation of the king. When her husband Siegfried died in 672, after nearly twenty years of marriage and five daughters, Bertha was determined to become a Religious. In the year 682 or 685 Bertha had founded a convent at Blangy, Artois (now Blangy-sur-Ternoise). She retreated there with her two eldest daughters, Deotila and Gertrude. Later, her daughter Deotila succeeded her as Abbess, when Bertha retired to live the life of a recluse, solely devoted to prayer. Bertha died at an advanced age of natural causes on 4 July 725. Her feast day is celebrated on 4 July. (See "Ste. Berthe et son Abbaye de Blangy", Lille, 1892).

== Hagiography ==
Two buildings which Bertha constructed had fallen down, but an angel in a vision supposedly guided her to another spot, and there after many difficulties a nunnery was built, which she entered with her two eldest daughters, Deotila and Gertrude.

A still later legend represents Gertrude as much persecuted by the attentions of a great noble, Roger, who wished to marry her by force, but she was saved from his violence by her mother's firm courage and trust in God.

Some time before her death Bertha is said to have resigned her office of abbess and to have shut herself up in a little cell built against the church wall.

The whole story of Bertha, as her biographers agree, is of a very late date but not entirely legendary.
