= Saint-Pol-sur-Ternoise station =

Railway station in Saint-Pol-sur-Ternoise, France

Coordinates: 50°22′44″N 2°20′22″E

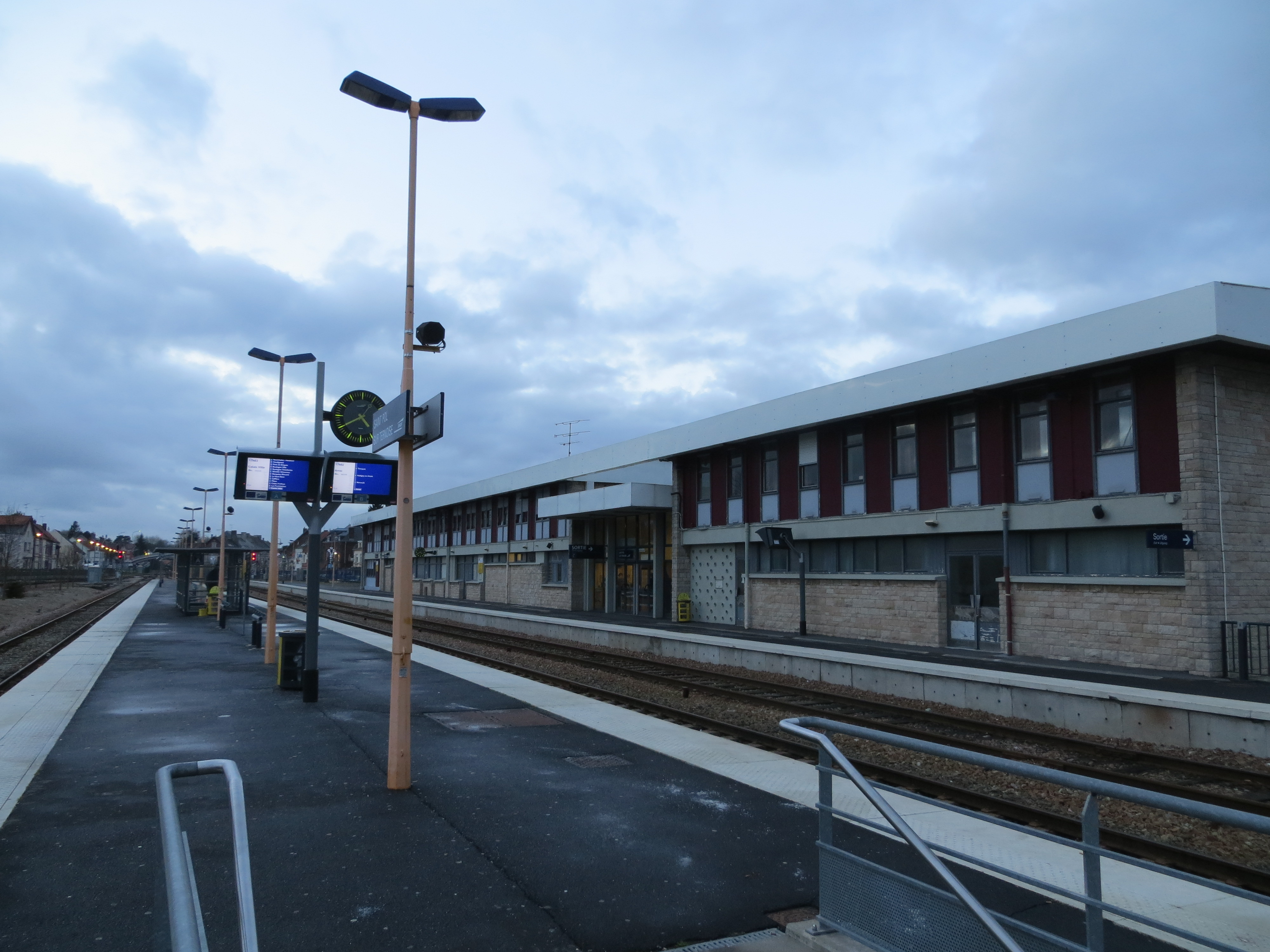
Platform at the Saint-Pol-sur-Ternoise station

Saint-Pol-sur-Ternoise station is a railway station serving the town Saint-Pol-sur-Ternoise, Pas-de-Calais department, northern France. It is situated on the Saint-Pol-sur-Ternoise–Étaples railway, the Arras–Saint-Pol-sur-Ternoise railway and the Fives–Abbeville railway. The station is served by regional trains towards Lille, Arras, Béthune and Étaples.

Preceding station	TER Hauts-de-France	Following station
Terminus	Krono K50	Pernes-Camblain towards Lille-Flandres
Terminus	Proxi P51	Pernes-Camblain towards Béthune
Anvin towards Étaples-Le Touquet	Proxi P53	Tincques towards Arras
