= Blangy-sur-Ternoise =

- Commune
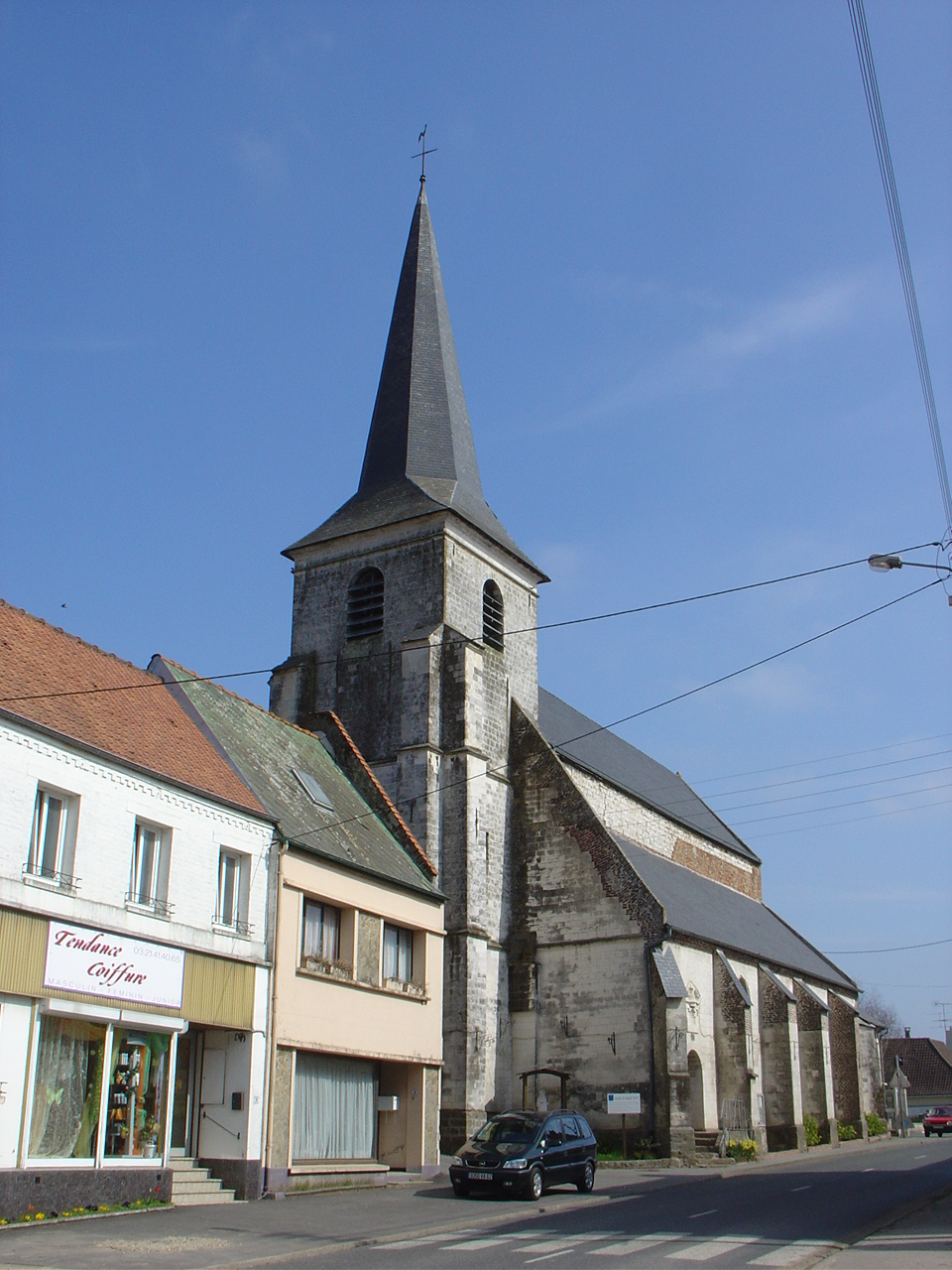
- The church of Blangy-sur-Ternoise

- Coat of arms
- Location of Blangy-sur-Ternoise
- Location within France Location within Hauts-de-France
- Coordinates: 50°25′18″N 2°10′08″E
- Country: France
- Region: Hauts-de-France
- Department: Pas-de-Calais
- Arrondissement: Montreuil
- Canton: Auxi-le-Château
- Intercommunality: CC des 7 Vallées

Government
  - Mayor (2020–2026): Michel Massart
- Area^{1}: 11.61 km^{2} (4.48 sq mi)
- Elevation: 44 m (144 ft)
- Highest elevation: 129 m (423 ft)
- Lowest elevation: 37 m (121 ft)
- Population (2023): 715
  - Density: 61.6/km^{2} (160/sq mi)
- Time zone: UTC+01:00 (CET)
  - Summer (DST): UTC+02:00 (CEST)
- INSEE/Postal code: 62138 /62770
- ^{1} French Land Register data, which excludes lakes, ponds, glaciers > 1 km^{2} (0.386 sq mi or 247 acres) and river estuaries.

Blangy-sur-Ternoise (French pronunciation: [blɑ̃ʒi syʁ tɛʁnwaz], literally Blangy on Ternoise) is a commune in the Pas-de-Calais department in the Hauts-de-France region in northern France.

== Geography ==
Situated some 9 miles(15 km) northwest of Saint-Pol-sur-Ternoise, on the D94 road.

== Population ==
Historical population
Year	Pop.	±% p.a.
1968	750	—
1975	677	−1.45%
1982	727	+1.02%
1990	747	+0.34%
1999	756	+0.13%
2007	745	−0.18%
2012	757	+0.32%
2017	720	−1.00%
2023	715	−0.12%
Source: INSEE

== Personalities ==
- Saint Bertha of Artois, established a convent at Blangy and died here in 725.

== See also ==
- Communes of the Pas-de-Calais department
