= Teneur =

- Commune
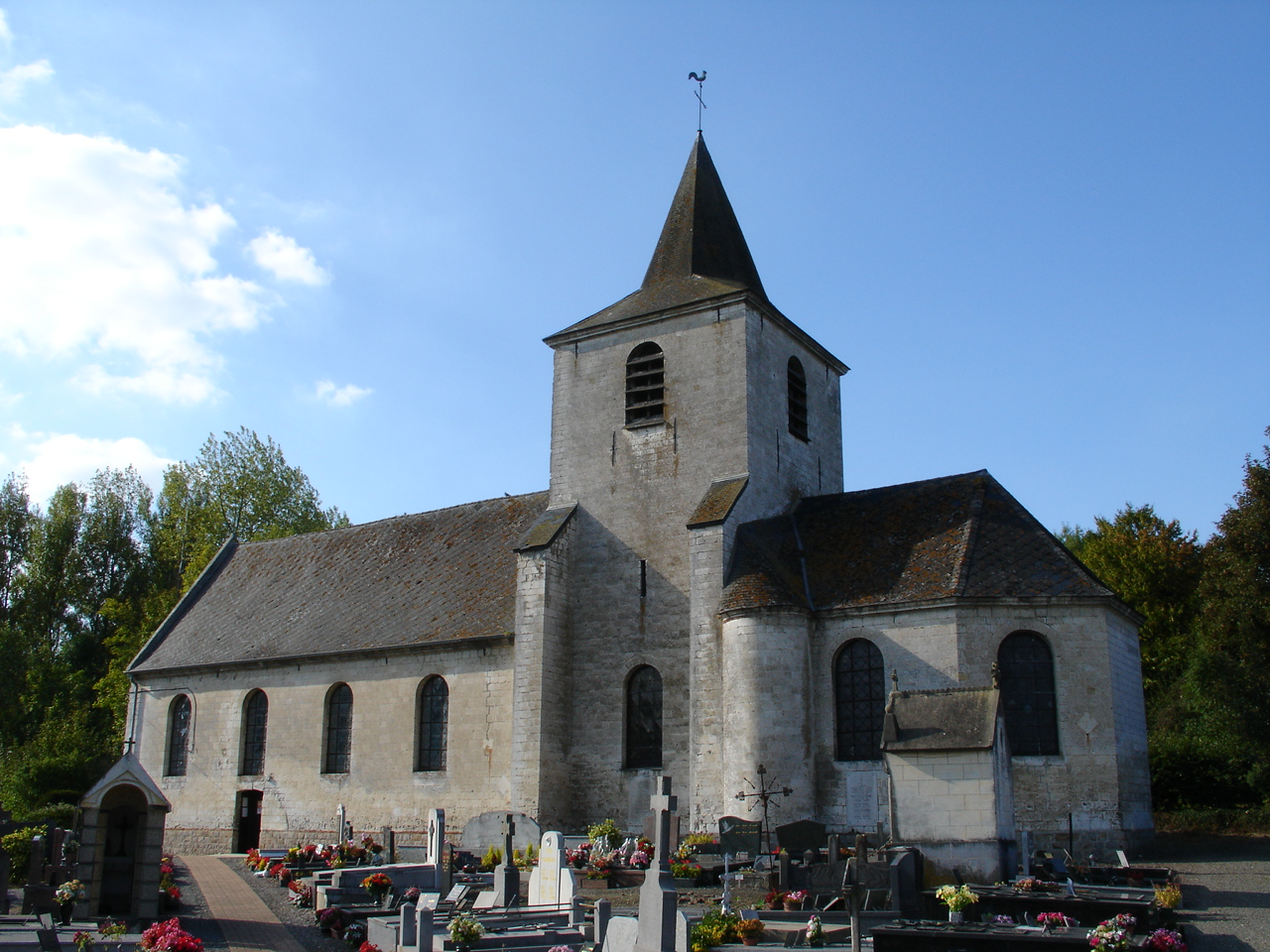
- The church of Teneur

- Coat of arms
- Location of Teneur
- Location within France Location within Hauts-de-France
- Coordinates: 50°27′06″N 2°13′09″E
- Country: France
- Region: Hauts-de-France
- Department: Pas-de-Calais
- Arrondissement: Arras
- Canton: Saint-Pol-sur-Ternoise
- Intercommunality: CC Ternois

Government
  - Mayor (2020–2026): Serge Magniez
- Area^{1}: 6.85 km^{2} (2.64 sq mi)
- Elevation: 56 m (184 ft)
- Highest elevation: 134 m (440 ft)
- Lowest elevation: 48 m (157 ft)
- Population (2023): 259
  - Density: 37.8/km^{2} (97.9/sq mi)
- Time zone: UTC+01:00 (CET)
  - Summer (DST): UTC+02:00 (CEST)
- INSEE/Postal code: 62808 /62134
- ^{1} French Land Register data, which excludes lakes, ponds, glaciers > 1 km^{2} (0.386 sq mi or 247 acres) and river estuaries.

Teneur (French pronunciation: [tənœʁ]) is a commune in the Pas-de-Calais department in the Hauts-de-France region of France.

== Geography ==
Teneur lies 25 miles (40 km) northwest of Arras, at the junction of the D97 and D94 roads, by the banks of the river Ternoise.

== Population ==
Historical population
Year	Pop.	±% p.a.
1968	242	—
1975	233	−0.54%
1982	260	+1.58%
1990	270	+0.47%
1999	278	+0.32%
2007	272	−0.27%
2012	288	+1.15%
2017	260	−2.02%
2023	259	−0.06%
Source: INSEE

== Places of interest ==
- The church of St. Germain, dating from the eighteenth century.

== See also ==
- Communes of the Pas-de-Calais department
