= Monchy-Cayeux =

- Commune
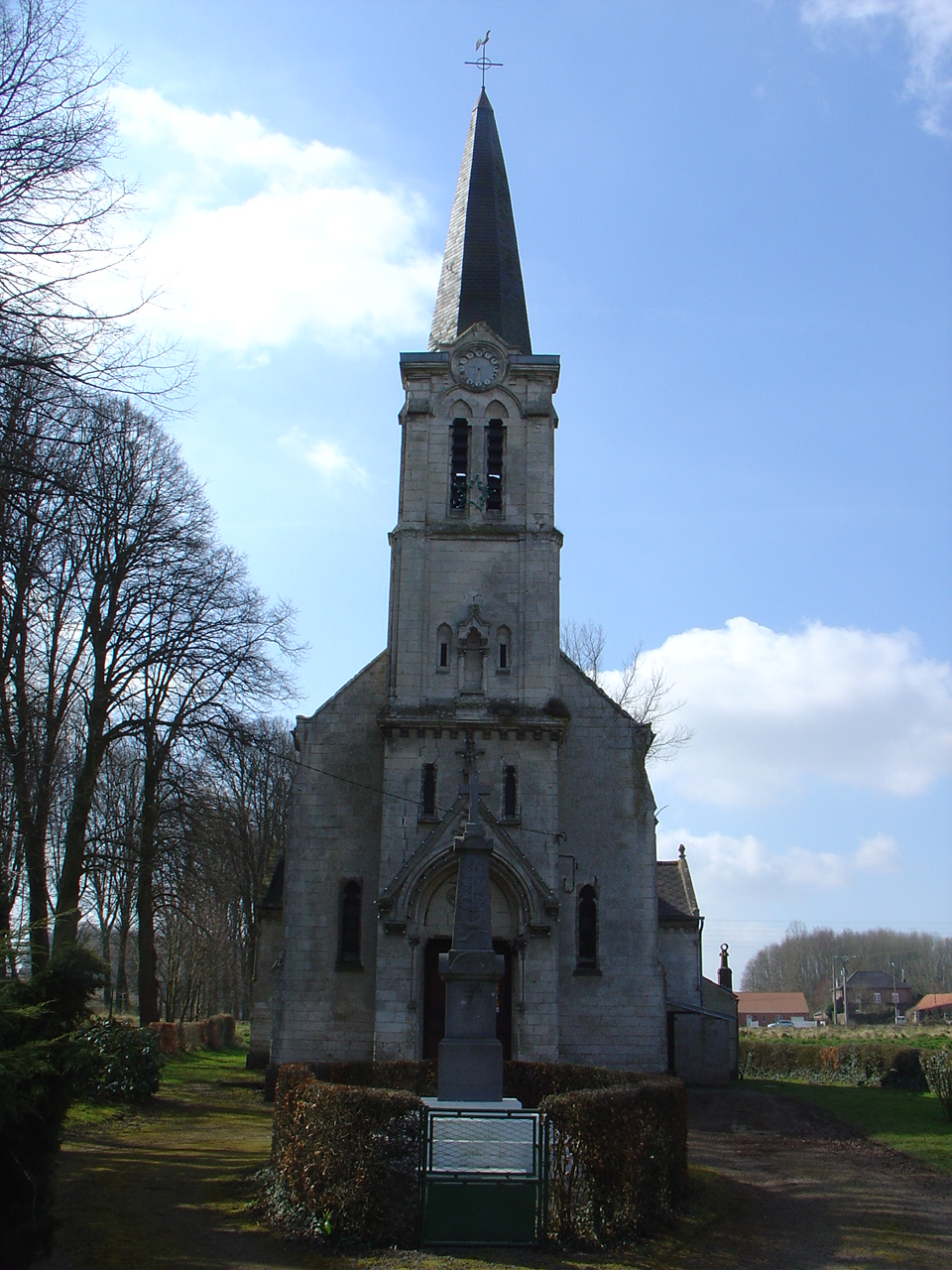
- The church of Monchy-Cayeux

- Coat of arms
- Location of Monchy-Cayeux
- Location within France Location within Hauts-de-France
- Coordinates: 50°26′19″N 2°16′39″E
- Country: France
- Region: Hauts-de-France
- Department: Pas-de-Calais
- Arrondissement: Arras
- Canton: Saint-Pol-sur-Ternoise
- Intercommunality: CC Ternois

Government
  - Mayor (2020–2026): Benoît Hoguet
- Area^{1}: 6.22 km^{2} (2.40 sq mi)
- Elevation: 68 m (223 ft)
- Highest elevation: 138 m (453 ft)
- Lowest elevation: 60 m (200 ft)
- Population (2023): 285
  - Density: 45.8/km^{2} (119/sq mi)
- Time zone: UTC+01:00 (CET)
  - Summer (DST): UTC+02:00 (CEST)
- INSEE/Postal code: 62581 /62134
- ^{1} French Land Register data, which excludes lakes, ponds, glaciers > 1 km^{2} (0.386 sq mi or 247 acres) and river estuaries.

Monchy-Cayeux (French pronunciation: [mɔ̃ʃi kajø]; Picard: Monchy-Caillau) is a commune in the Pas-de-Calais department in the Hauts-de-France region of France 29 miles (47 km) northwest of Arras, in the Ternoise river valley.

== Population ==
Historical population
Year	Pop.	±% p.a.
1968	313	—
1975	286	−1.28%
1982	277	−0.46%
1990	297	+0.88%
1999	274	−0.89%
2007	283	+0.40%
2012	311	+1.90%
2017	300	−0.72%
2023	285	−0.85%
Source: INSEE

== See also ==
- Communes of the Pas-de-Calais department
