= Tilly-Capelle =

- Commune
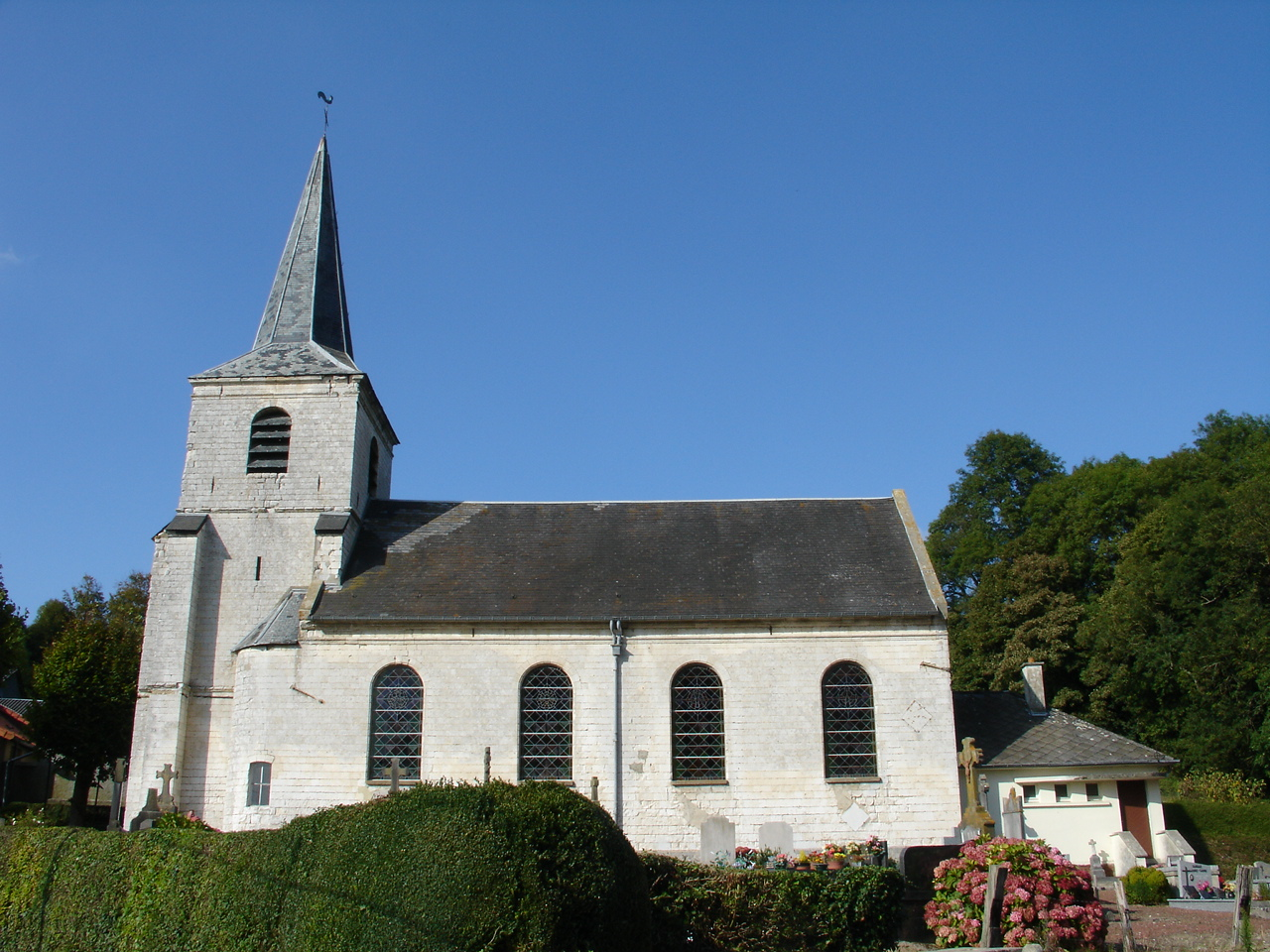
- The church of Tilly-Capelle
- Location of Tilly-Capelle
- Location within France Location within Hauts-de-France
- Coordinates: 50°26′40″N 2°11′58″E
- Country: France
- Region: Hauts-de-France
- Department: Pas-de-Calais
- Arrondissement: Arras
- Canton: Saint-Pol-sur-Ternoise
- Intercommunality: CC Ternois

Government
  - Mayor (2020–2026): Francis Noury
- Area^{1}: 6.31 km^{2} (2.44 sq mi)
- Elevation: 58 m (190 ft)
- Highest elevation: 130 m (430 ft)
- Lowest elevation: 42 m (138 ft)
- Population (2023): 154
  - Density: 24.4/km^{2} (63.2/sq mi)
- Time zone: UTC+01:00 (CET)
  - Summer (DST): UTC+02:00 (CEST)
- INSEE/Postal code: 62818 /62134
- ^{1} French Land Register data, which excludes lakes, ponds, glaciers > 1 km^{2} (0.386 sq mi or 247 acres) and river estuaries.

Tilly-Capelle is a commune in the Pas-de-Calais department in the Hauts-de-France region of France in the Ternoise valley, 31 miles (50 km) northwest of Arras.

== Population ==
Historical population
Year	Pop.	±% p.a.
1968	173	—
1975	156	−1.47%
1982	166	+0.89%
1990	180	+1.02%
1999	157	−1.51%
2007	168	+0.85%
2012	154	−1.73%
2017	159	+0.64%
2023	154	−0.53%
Source: INSEE

== See also ==
- Communes of the Pas-de-Calais department
