= Gauchin-Verloingt =

- Commune
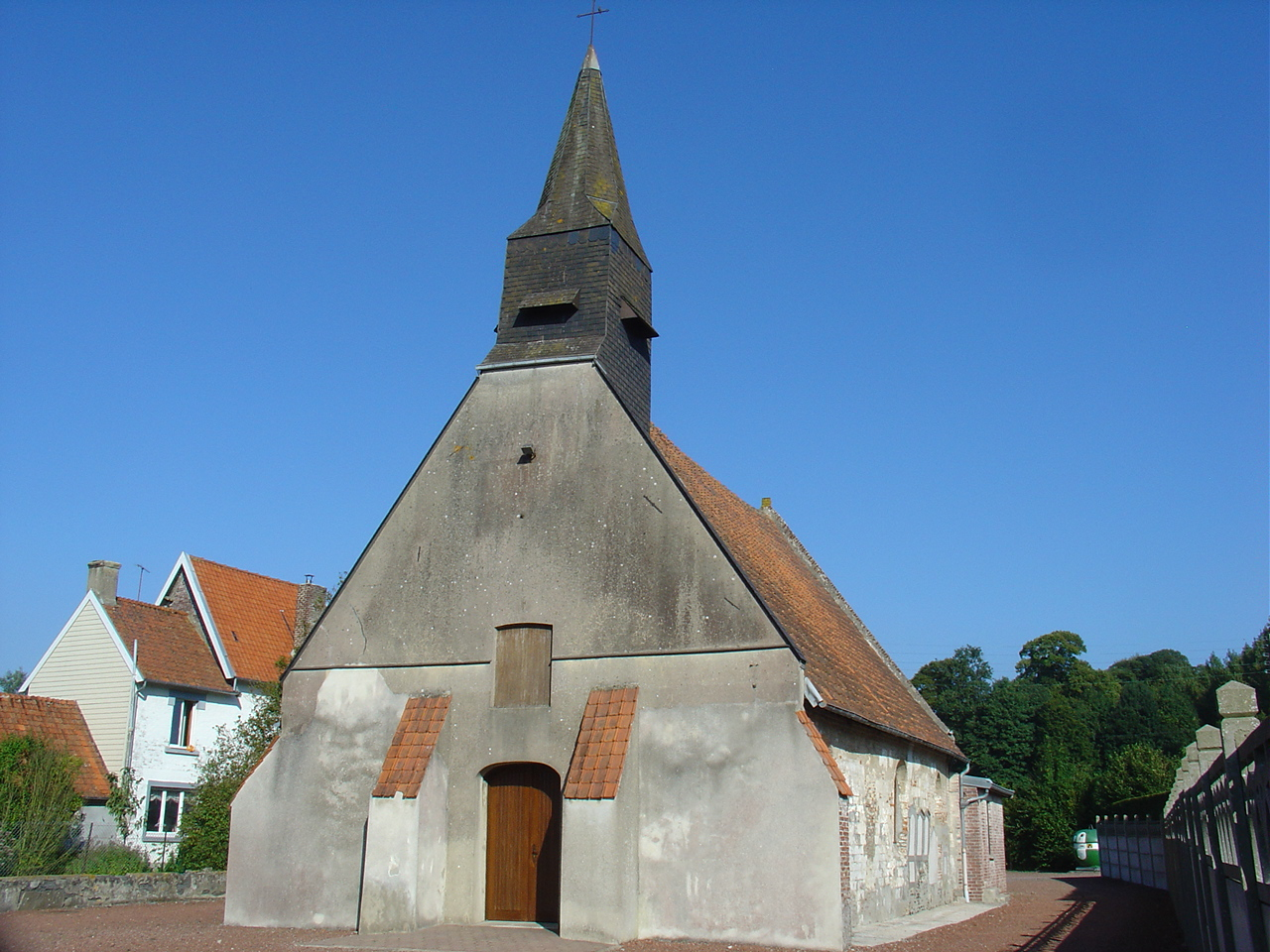
- The church of Gauchin-Verloingt

- Coat of arms
- Location of Gauchin-Verloingt
- Location within France Location within Hauts-de-France
- Coordinates: 50°23′43″N 2°18′47″E
- Country: France
- Region: Hauts-de-France
- Department: Pas-de-Calais
- Arrondissement: Arras
- Canton: Saint-Pol-sur-Ternoise
- Intercommunality: CC Ternois

Government
  - Mayor (2023–2026): Dominique Crépy
- Area^{1}: 5.92 km^{2} (2.29 sq mi)
- Elevation: 85 m (279 ft)
- Highest elevation: 141 m (463 ft)
- Lowest elevation: 75 m (246 ft)
- Population (2023): 774
  - Density: 131/km^{2} (339/sq mi)
- Time zone: UTC+01:00 (CET)
  - Summer (DST): UTC+02:00 (CEST)
- INSEE/Postal code: 62367 /62130
- ^{1} French Land Register data, which excludes lakes, ponds, glaciers > 1 km^{2} (0.386 sq mi or 247 acres) and river estuaries.

Gauchin-Verloingt (French pronunciation: [ɡoʃɛ̃ vɛʁlwɛ̃]) is a commune in the Pas-de-Calais department in the Hauts-de-France region of France.

== Geography ==
A farming village situated in the valley of the Ternoise river, 23 miles (37 km) northwest of Arras, at the junction of the D343 and the D100 roads.

== Population ==
Historical population
Year	Pop.	±% p.a.
1968	396	—
1975	465	+2.32%
1982	592	+3.51%
1990	801	+3.85%
1999	825	+0.33%
2007	918	+1.34%
2012	856	−1.39%
2017	838	−0.42%
2023	774	−1.32%
Source: INSEE

== Places of interest ==
- The church of St.Vaast, dating from the seventeenth century.
- The chapel at Rocourt, also dating from the seventeenth century.
- An old farmhouse

== See also ==
- Communes of the Pas-de-Calais department
