= Ligny-Saint-Flochel =

- Commune
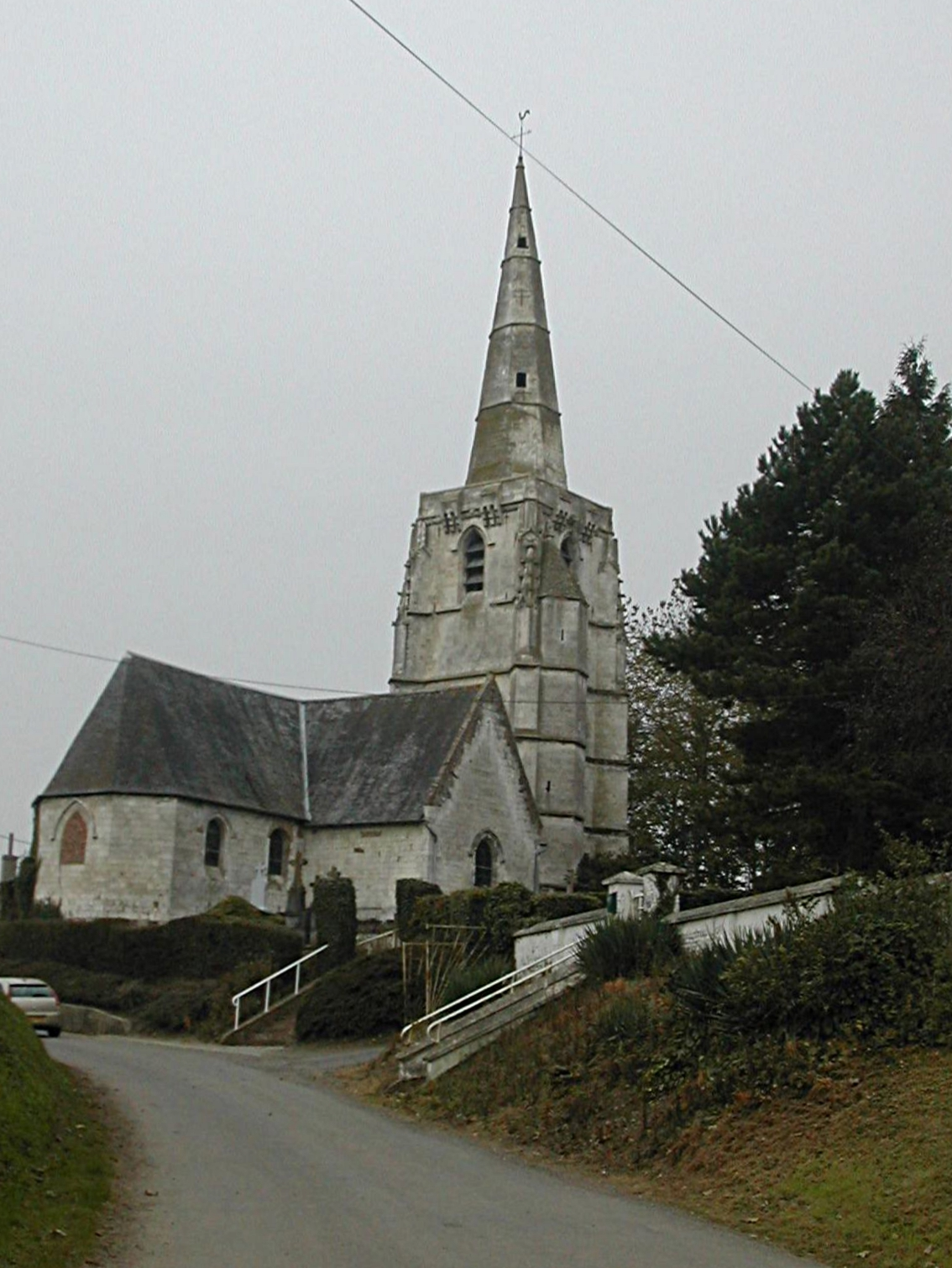
- The church of Ligny-Saint-Flochel

- Coat of arms
- Location of Ligny-Saint-Flochel
- Location within France Location within Hauts-de-France
- Coordinates: 50°21′32″N 2°25′47″E
- Country: France
- Region: Hauts-de-France
- Department: Pas-de-Calais
- Arrondissement: Arras
- Canton: Saint-Pol-sur-Ternoise
- Intercommunality: Ternois

Government
  - Mayor (2020–2026): Jean-Marie Cretel
- Area^{1}: 5.23 km^{2} (2.02 sq mi)
- Elevation: 134 m (440 ft)
- Highest elevation: 157 m (515 ft)
- Lowest elevation: 111 m (364 ft)
- Population (2023): 235
  - Density: 44.9/km^{2} (116/sq mi)
- Time zone: UTC+01:00 (CET)
  - Summer (DST): UTC+02:00 (CEST)
- INSEE/Postal code: 62514 /62127
- ^{1} French Land Register data, which excludes lakes, ponds, glaciers > 1 km^{2} (0.386 sq mi or 247 acres) and river estuaries.

Ligny-Saint-Flochel (French pronunciation: [liɲi sɛ̃ flɔʃɛl]) is a commune in the Pas-de-Calais department in the Hauts-de-France region of France 15 miles (24 km) west of Arras.

== Population ==
Historical population
Year	Pop.	±% p.a.
1968	227	—
1975	209	−1.17%
1982	236	+1.75%
1990	243	+0.37%
1999	202	−2.03%
2007	232	+1.75%
2012	260	+2.31%
2017	258	−0.15%
2023	235	−1.54%
Source: INSEE

== See also ==
- Communes of the Pas-de-Calais department
