= Wavrans-sur-Ternoise =

- Commune
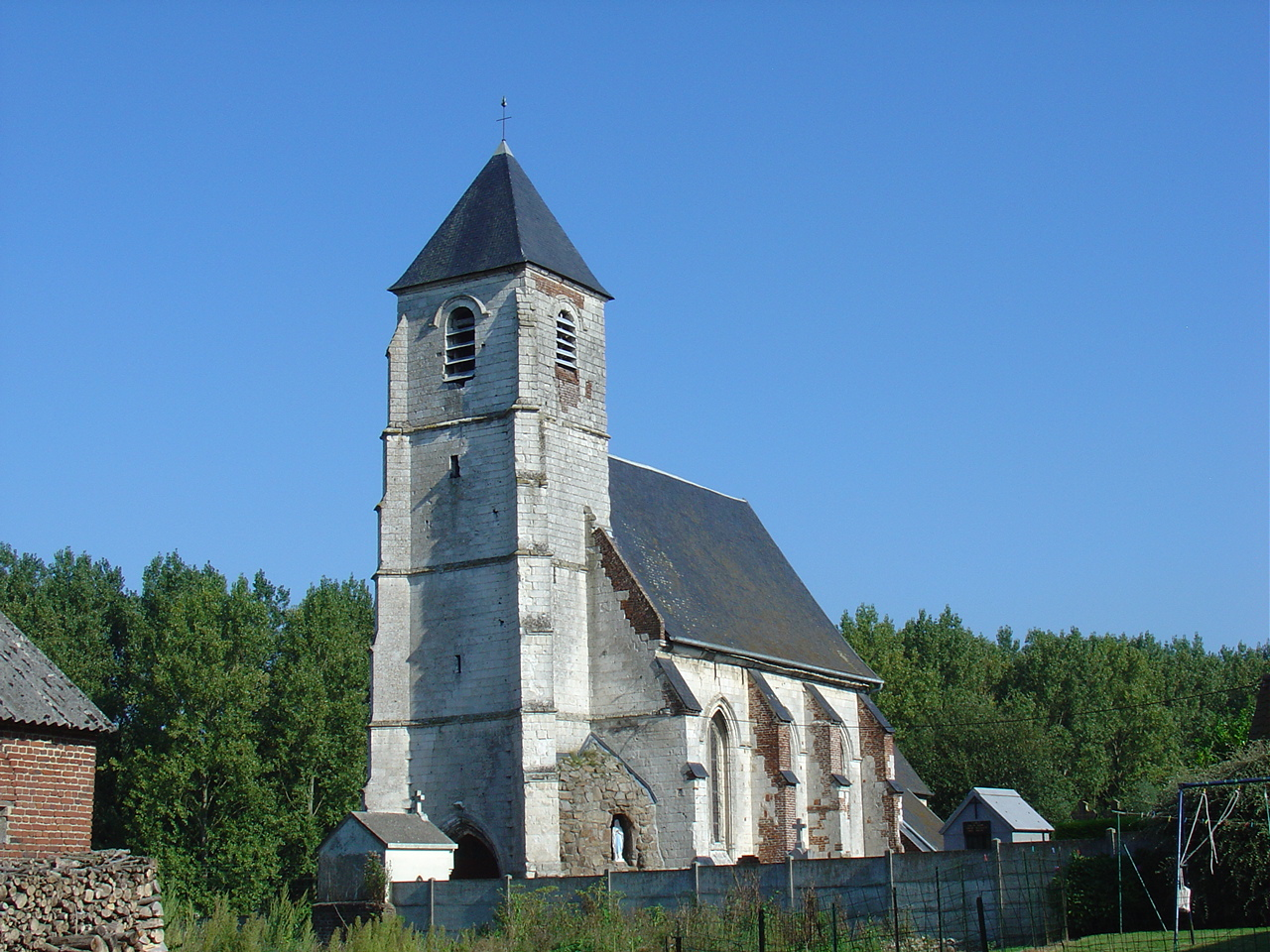
- The church of Wavrans-sur-Ternoise
- Location of Wavrans-sur-Ternoise
- Location within France Location within Hauts-de-France
- Coordinates: 50°24′46″N 2°18′02″E
- Country: France
- Region: Hauts-de-France
- Department: Pas-de-Calais
- Arrondissement: Arras
- Canton: Saint-Pol-sur-Ternoise
- Intercommunality: Ternois

Government
  - Mayor (2020–2026): Luc Delbe
- Area^{1}: 4.81 km^{2} (1.86 sq mi)
- Elevation: 47 m (154 ft)
- Highest elevation: 126 m (413 ft)
- Lowest elevation: 67 m (220 ft)
- Population (2023): 197
  - Density: 41.0/km^{2} (106/sq mi)
- Time zone: UTC+01:00 (CET)
  - Summer (DST): UTC+02:00 (CEST)
- INSEE/Postal code: 62883 /62130
- ^{1} French Land Register data, which excludes lakes, ponds, glaciers > 1 km^{2} (0.386 sq mi or 247 acres) and river estuaries.

Wavrans-sur-Ternoise (French pronunciation: [wavʁɑ̃ syʁ tɛʁnwaz], literally Wavrans on Ternoise) is a commune in the Pas-de-Calais department in the Hauts-de-France region of France about 28 miles (45 km) northwest of Arras on the banks of the river Ternoise.

== Population ==
Historical population
Year	Pop.	±% p.a.
1968	231	—
1975	206	−1.62%
1982	200	−0.42%
1990	177	−1.52%
1999	201	+1.42%
2007	216	+0.90%
2012	215	−0.09%
2017	201	−1.34%
2023	197	−0.33%
Source: INSEE

== See also ==
- Communes of the Pas-de-Calais department
