= Grigny, Pas-de-Calais =

Grigny
- Commune
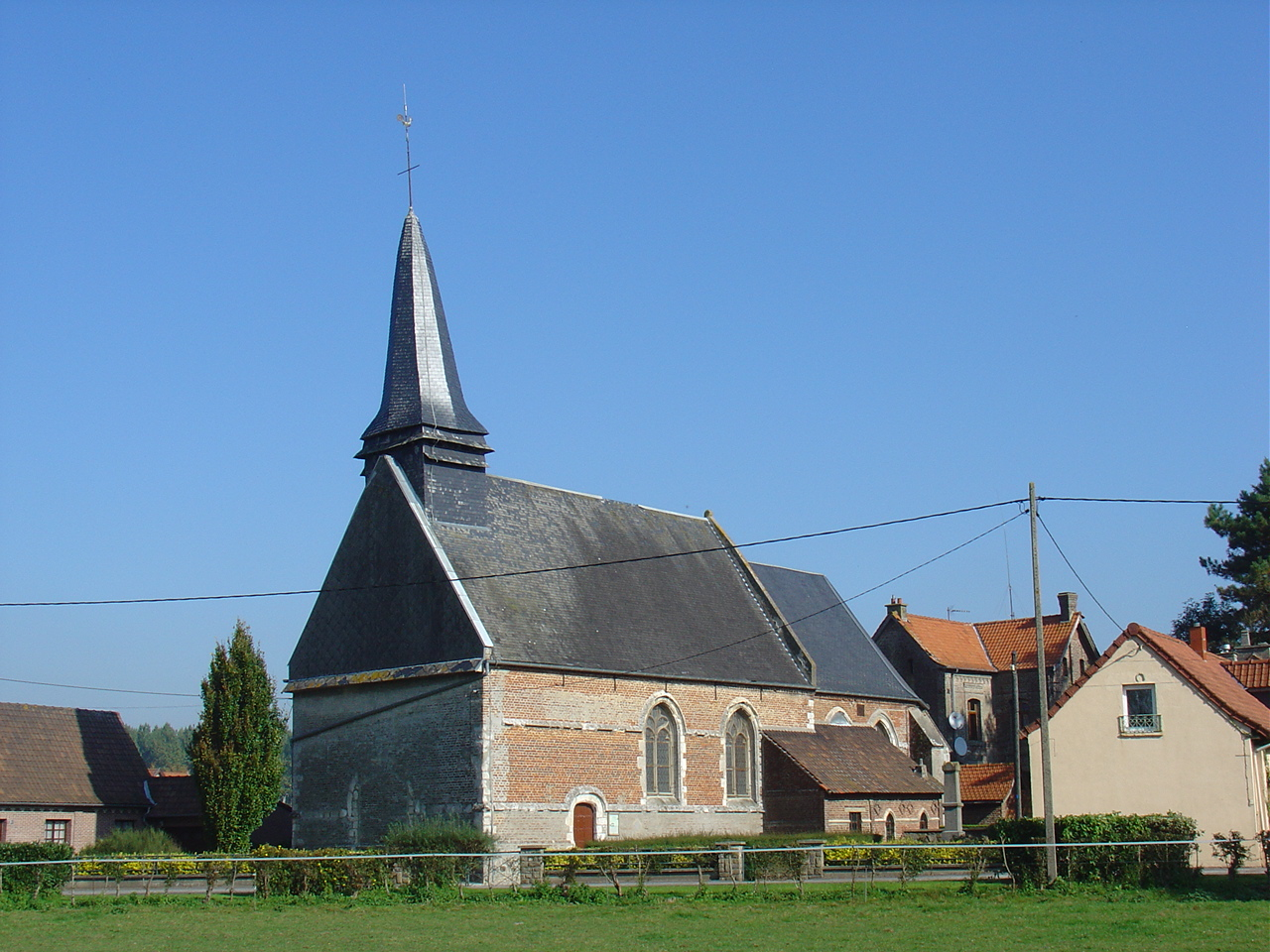
- The church of Grigny

- Coat of arms
- Location of Grigny
- Location within France Location within Hauts-de-France
- Coordinates: 50°23′08″N 2°04′02″E
- Country: France
- Region: Hauts-de-France
- Department: Pas-de-Calais
- Arrondissement: Montreuil
- Canton: Auxi-le-Château
- Intercommunality: CC des 7 Vallées

Government
  - Mayor (2020–2026): Francis Maniez
- Area^{1}: 2.14 km^{2} (0.83 sq mi)
- Elevation: 31 m (102 ft)
- Highest elevation: 85 m (279 ft)
- Lowest elevation: 25 m (82 ft)
- Population (2023): 290
  - Density: 140/km^{2} (350/sq mi)
- Time zone: UTC+01:00 (CET)
  - Summer (DST): UTC+02:00 (CEST)
- INSEE/Postal code: 62388 /62140
- ^{1} French Land Register data, which excludes lakes, ponds, glaciers > 1 km^{2} (0.386 sq mi or 247 acres) and river estuaries.

Grigny (French pronunciation: [ɡʁiɲi]) is a commune in the department of Pas-de-Calais, in the French region of Hauts-de-France at the edge of the forest of Hesdin, about 13 miles (21 km) southeast of Montreuil-sur-Mer.

== Population ==
Historical population
Year	Pop.	±% p.a.
1968	383	—
1975	399	+0.59%
1982	375	−0.88%
1990	361	−0.47%
1999	329	−1.03%
2007	298	−1.23%
2012	298	+0.00%
2017	296	−0.13%
2023	290	−0.34%
Source: INSEE

== See also ==
- Communes of the Pas-de-Calais department
