= Saint-Pol-sur-Ternoise =

- Commune
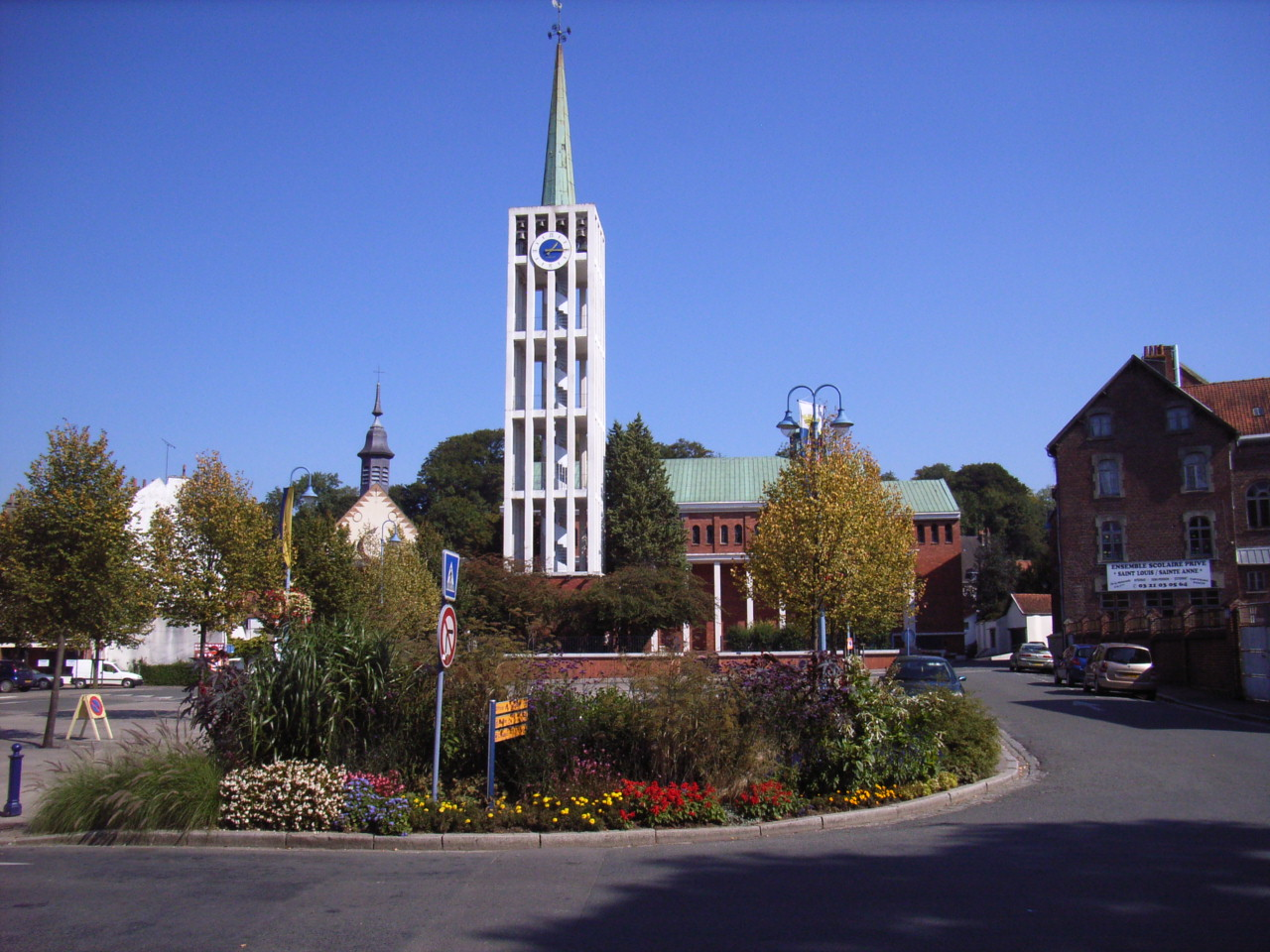
- The bell tower of Saint-Pol-sur-Ternoise

- Coat of arms
- Location of Saint-Pol-sur-Ternoise
- Location within France Location within Hauts-de-France
- Coordinates: 50°22′47″N 2°20′06″E
- Country: France
- Region: Hauts-de-France
- Department: Pas-de-Calais
- Arrondissement: Arras
- Canton: Saint-Pol-sur-Ternoise
- Intercommunality: CC Ternois

Government
  - Mayor (2022–2026): Danielle Vasseur
- Area^{1}: 8.24 km^{2} (3.18 sq mi)
- Elevation: 87 m (285 ft)
- Highest elevation: 149 m (489 ft)
- Lowest elevation: 82 m (269 ft)
- Population (2023): 4,677
  - Density: 568/km^{2} (1,470/sq mi)
- Time zone: UTC+01:00 (CET)
  - Summer (DST): UTC+02:00 (CEST)
- INSEE/Postal code: 62767 /62130
- ^{1} French Land Register data, which excludes lakes, ponds, glaciers > 1 km^{2} (0.386 sq mi or 247 acres) and river estuaries.

Saint-Pol-sur-Ternoise (French pronunciation: [sɛ̃ pɔl syʁ tɛʁnwaz], lit. 'Saint Pol on Ternoise'; West Flemish: Sint-Pols-aan-de-Ternas; Picard: Saint-Po-su-Térnoèse) is a commune in the Pas-de-Calais department in northern France. It is the seat of the canton of Saint-Pol-sur-Ternoise.

== Geography ==
Saint-Pol-sur-Ternoise lies in the middle of the Pas-de-Calais department, on the river Ternoise. It lies 26 km southwest of Béthune, and 32 km west of Arras, the prefecture of Pas-de-Calais. Saint-Pol-sur-Ternoise station is served by regional trains towards Lille, Arras, Béthune and Étaples.

== History ==
The county of Saint-Pol-sur-Ternoise, usually referred to as just Saint-Pol, was originally a stronghold of the Counts of Flanders and was established as a county in the late 9th century. When the county passed out of the family of the Flemish counts, it remained subject to the Count of Flanders as his vassals until 1180. It became subject to France, then Artois (1237–1329), then France again until it ceased to exist as a county and was annexed to France in 1702.

Saint-Pol was first controlled by the Flemish counts, then by the family known as Campdavaine from early in the 11th century. In 1205 the county passed to the seigneurs of Châtillon through marriage, and remained with this dynasty until 1360 when it passed to the Luxembourg dynasty. Around 1487 the county passed to the Capetian-Bourbon-Vendôme dynasty through marriage, then to the Longueville-Neuchâtel dynasty from around 1563. In 1702 it came under direct rule of France.

In the Middle Ages, several of the Counts of Saint-Pol were active in the Crusades.

On 7 November 1920, the remains of four unidentifiable, fallen British soldiers disinterred from the battlefields at Aisne, Arras, the Somme and Ypres were brought to the town's chapel. There, Brigadier-General Louis John Wyatt of the North Staffordshire Regiment, aided by Lieutenant-Colonel EAS Gell, selected one to be carried to Westminster Abbey to be re-buried in the Tomb of the Unknown Warrior. The remaining three bodies were removed and reburied in the military cemetery at Wyatt's headquarters at St Pol.

== Population ==
Historical population
Year	Pop.	±% p.a.
1968	5,318	—
1975	5,717	+1.04%
1982	5,752	+0.09%
1990	5,215	−1.22%
1999	5,220	+0.01%
2007	5,132	−0.21%
2012	5,113	−0.07%
2017	4,971	−0.56%
2023	4,677	−1.01%
Source: INSEE

== Notable people ==
- Marie de St Pol (c. 1303–1377), foundress of Pembroke College, Cambridge, was born in Saint-Pol-sur-Ternoise
- Pierre Repp (1909–1986), humorist and actor, was born in Saint-Pol-sur-Ternoise
- Martial Joseph Armand Herman (1749–1795), a politician of the French Revolution, and temporary French Foreign Minister, was born in Saint-Pol-sur-Ternoise
- Nicolas Aubriot, footballer, was born in Saint-Pol-sur-Ternoise

== See also ==
- Counts of Saint-Pol
- Communes of the Pas-de-Calais department
