= Montreuil-sur-Mer =

Montreuil-sur-Mer Montreu(l)-su-Mér (Picard)
- Subprefecture and commune
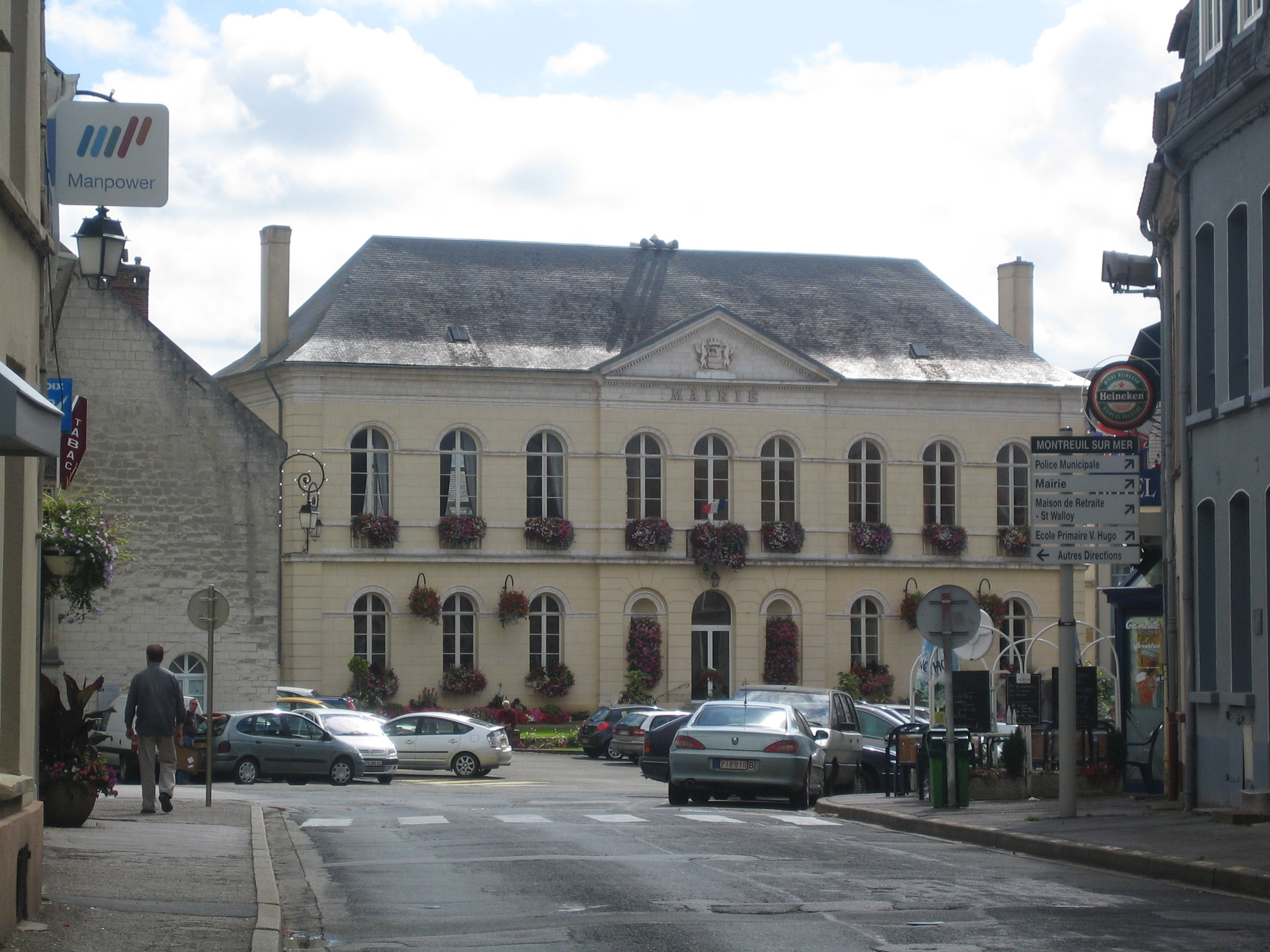
- The town hall of Montreuil-Sur-Mer

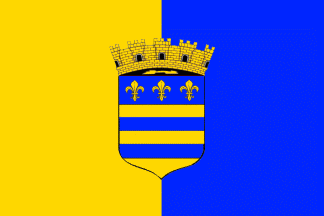
- Flag Coat of arms
- Location of Montreuil-sur-Mer
- Location within France Location within Hauts-de-France
- Coordinates: 50°27′53″N 1°45′47″E
- Country: France
- Region: Hauts-de-France
- Department: Pas-de-Calais
- Arrondissement: Montreuil
- Canton: Berck
- Intercommunality: CA Deux Baies en Montreuillois

Government
  - Mayor (2020–2026): Pierre Ducrocq
- Area^{1}: 2.85 km^{2} (1.10 sq mi)
- Highest elevation: 43 m (141 ft)
- Lowest elevation: 2 m (6.6 ft)
- Population (2023): 1,912
  - Density: 671/km^{2} (1,740/sq mi)
- Time zone: UTC+01:00 (CET)
  - Summer (DST): UTC+02:00 (CEST)
- INSEE/Postal code: 62588 /62170
- ^{1} French Land Register data, which excludes lakes, ponds, glaciers > 1 km^{2} (0.386 sq mi or 247 acres) and river estuaries.

Montreuil-sur-Mer (French pronunciation: [mɔ̃tʁœj syʁ mɛʁ], lit. 'Montreuil on Sea'; Picard: Montreu-su-Mér or Montreul-su-Mér; Dutch: Monsterole) is a subprefecture in the Pas-de-Calais Department in northern France. Though commonly called by this name since at least the twelfth century, it was legally known as Montreuil until 31 December 2022. It is located on the Canche river, not far from Étaples. The sea, however, is now some distance away. Montreuil-sur-Mer station has rail connections to Arras and Étaples.

== History ==
Montreuil-sur-Mer is surrounded by notable brickwork ramparts, constructed after the destruction of the town by troops of Habsburg emperor Charles V in June 1537. These fortifications pre-date the extensive fortification of towns in northern France by Sébastien Le Prestre de Vauban in the 17th century, and include a separate defensive redoubt, the Citadel of Montreuil-sur-Mer.

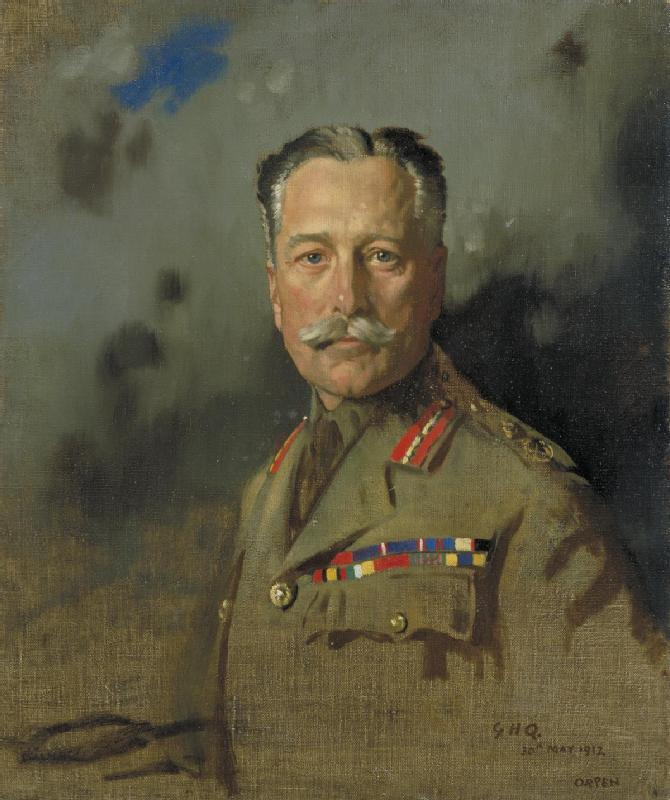
Portrait of Field-Marshal Sir Douglas Haig at General Headquarters, France, by Sir William Orpen, May 1917

Montreuil-sur-Mer was the headquarters of the British Army in France during the First World War from March 1916 until it closed in April 1919. The military academy there provided excellent facilities for GHQ.

Montreuil-sur-Mer was chosen as GHQ for a wide variety of reasons. It was on a main road from London to Paris—the two chief centres of the campaign—though not on a main railway line, which would have been an inconvenience. It was not an industrial town and so avoided the complications alike of noise and of a possibly troublesome civil population. It was from a telephone and motor transit point of view in a very central situation to serve the needs of a Force which was based on Dunkirk, Calais, Boulogne, Dieppe, and Le Havre, and had its front stretching from the River Somme to beyond the Belgian frontier.

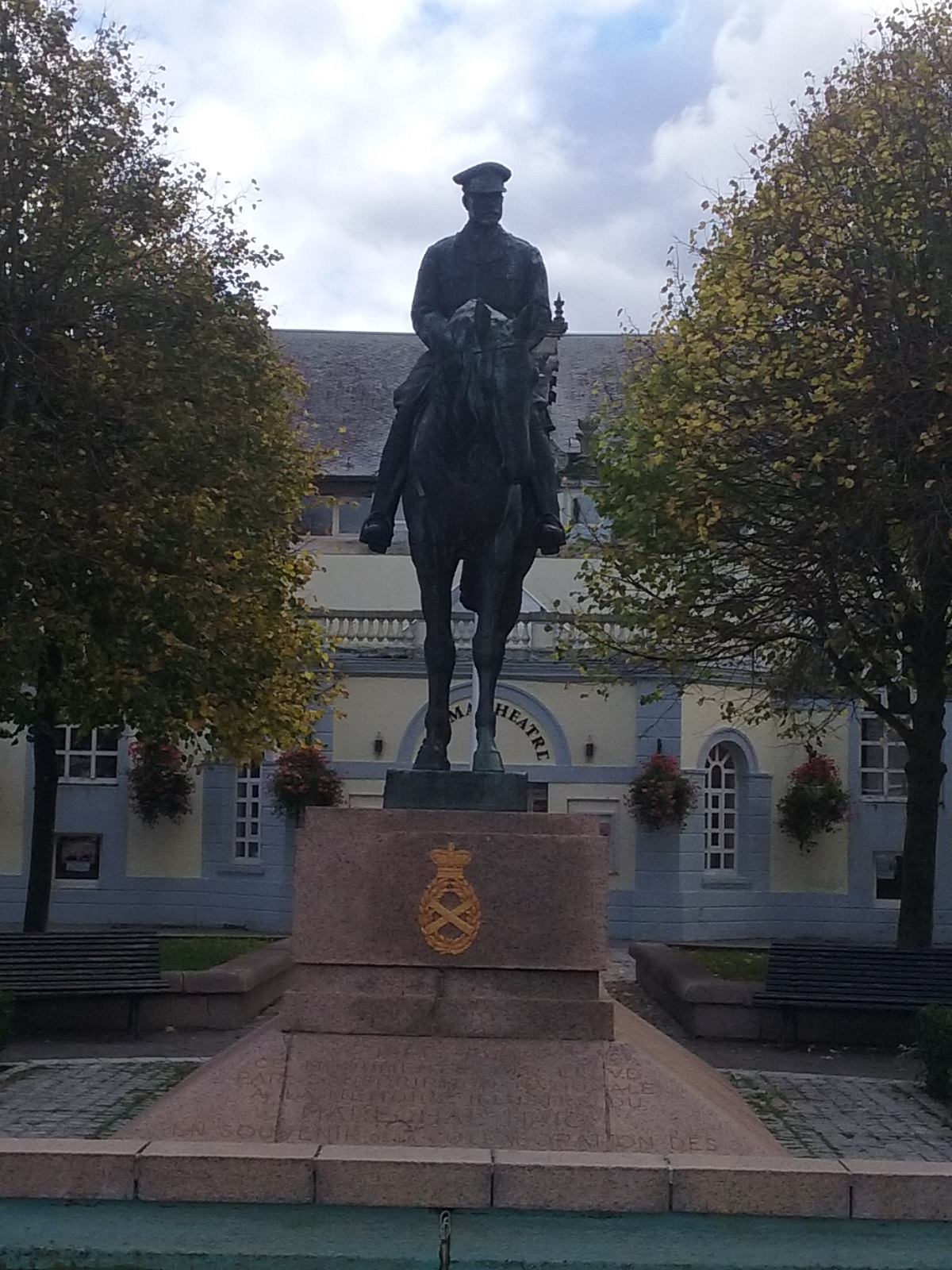
The statue of Field Marshal Haig, standing outside the theatre in Montreuil-sur-Mer

Haig staff member Sir Frank Fox OBE wrote a critically acclaimed contemporary account of the headquarters in 1916, originally published under the pseudonym "G.S.O.", called G.H.Q. (Montreuil-sur-Mer) His work in the QMG's Directorate in the final offensive against the German Army resulted in his being awarded the OBE (Military) He was also Mentioned in Despatches.

General Haig was quartered in the nearby Château de Beaurepaire, two miles (3.2 kilometres) southeast of the town on the D138. There is a plaque on the château wall to commemorate this.

King George V, accompanied by Haig, made a triumphant passage through Montreuil-sur-Mer on his way to Paris on 27 November 1918.

A statue of Haig on horseback, commemorating his stay, can be seen outside the theatre on the Place Charles de Gaulle. During the German occupation of the town during the Second World War, the statue was taken down. It was never found and is thought to have been melted down. It was rebuilt in the 1950s, using the sculptor's original mould.

== Demographics ==
Historical population
Year	Pop.	±% p.a.
1968	2,944	—
1975	2,840	−0.51%
1982	2,753	−0.44%
1990	2,450	−1.45%
1999	2,428	−0.10%
2007	2,316	−0.59%
2012	2,191	−1.10%
2017	2,014	−1.67%
2023	1,912	−0.86%
Source: INSEE

== Literature ==
Laurence Sterne visited the town in 1765. He recounted his visit through the eyes of the narrator of his novel A Sentimental Journey Through France and Italy (1768).

In Victor Hugo's novel Les Misérables (1862), Montreuil-sur-Mer is the setting for much of volume I, "Fantine," being the hometown of the eponymous heroine. In early English-language editions, the town is identified only as M____-sur-M__, and the name is changed entirely in some film adaptations. E.g., the 1998 film directed by Bille August calls it "Vigaud," a pun on Victor Hugo. However, the English-language version of the popular Schönberg-Boublil musical, and all screen adaptations thereof, restore the full name in the on-screen title cards, although it is never spoken in the libretto.

== International relations ==
Montreuil-sur-Mer is twinned with Slough, England, UK.

== Gallery ==
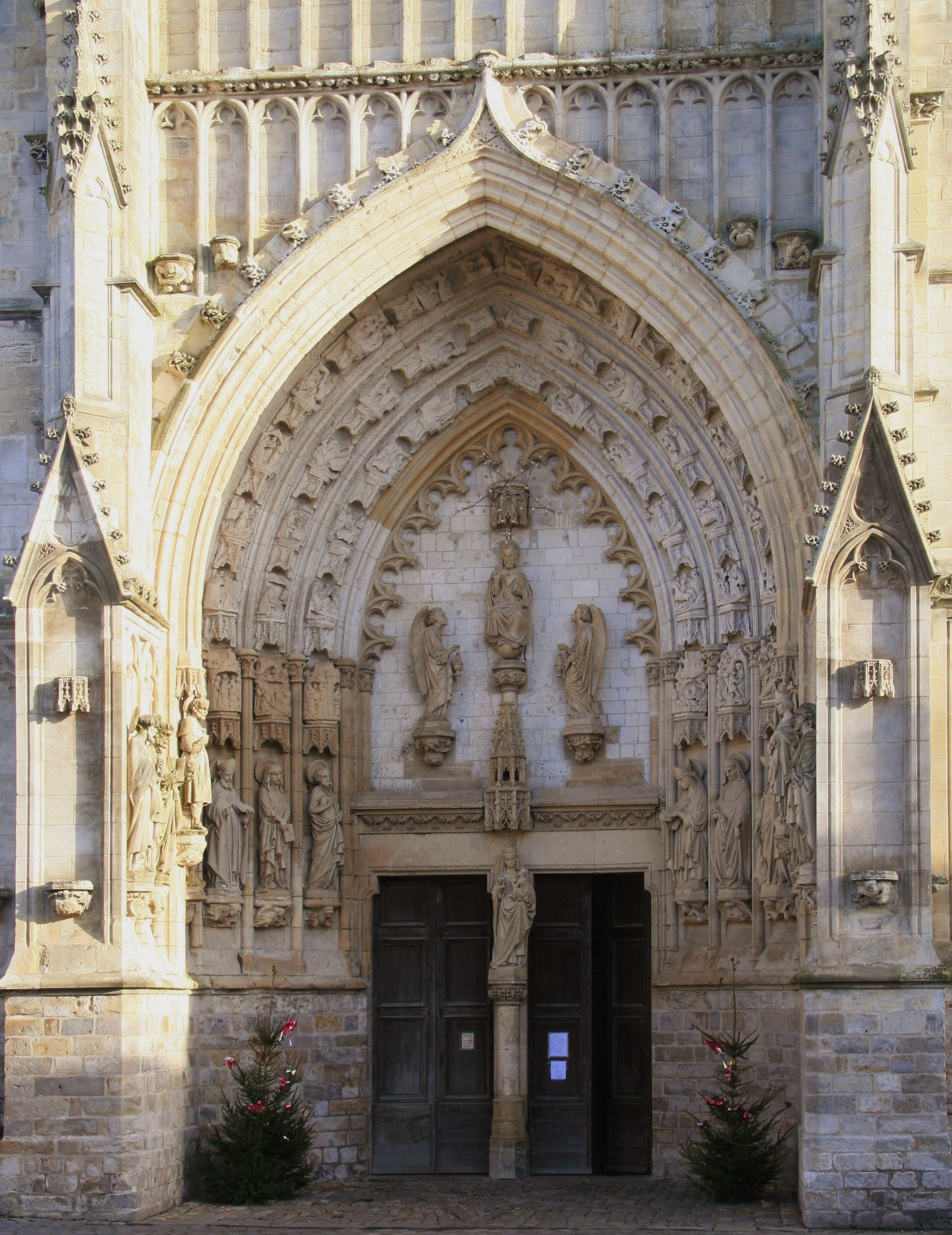
Church, Montreuil-sur-Mer

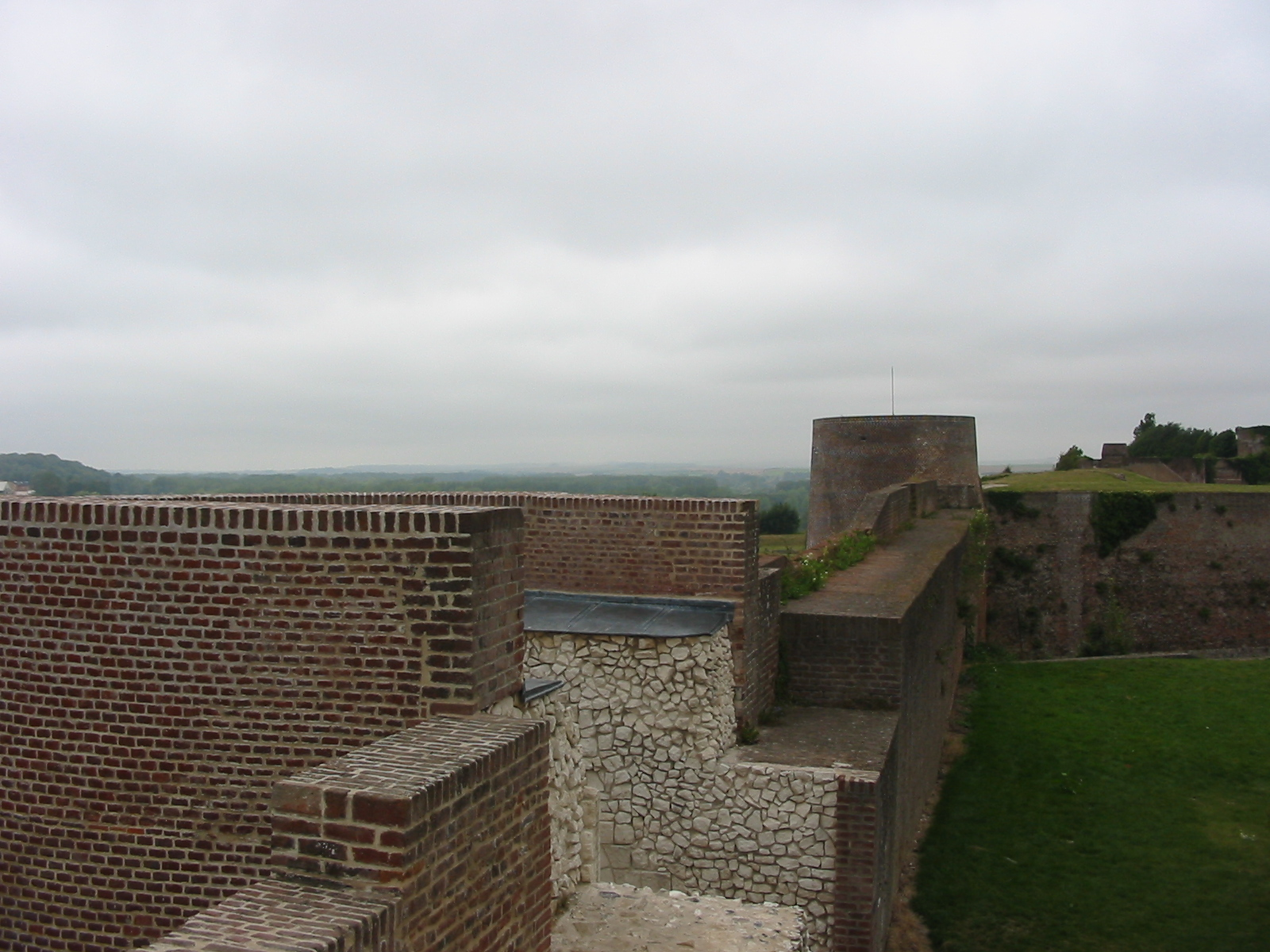
Walls of Montreuil-sur-Mer

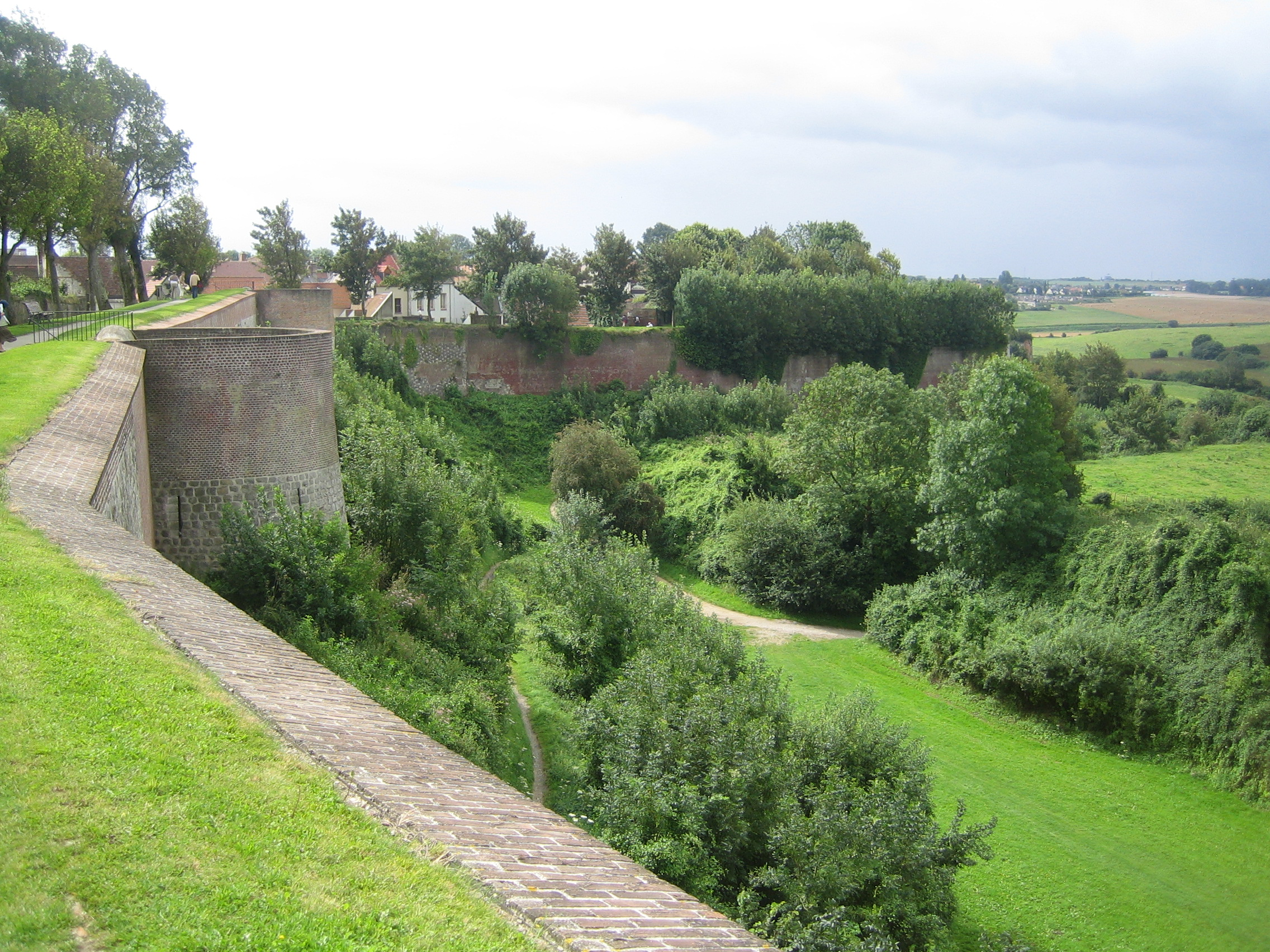
Ramparts

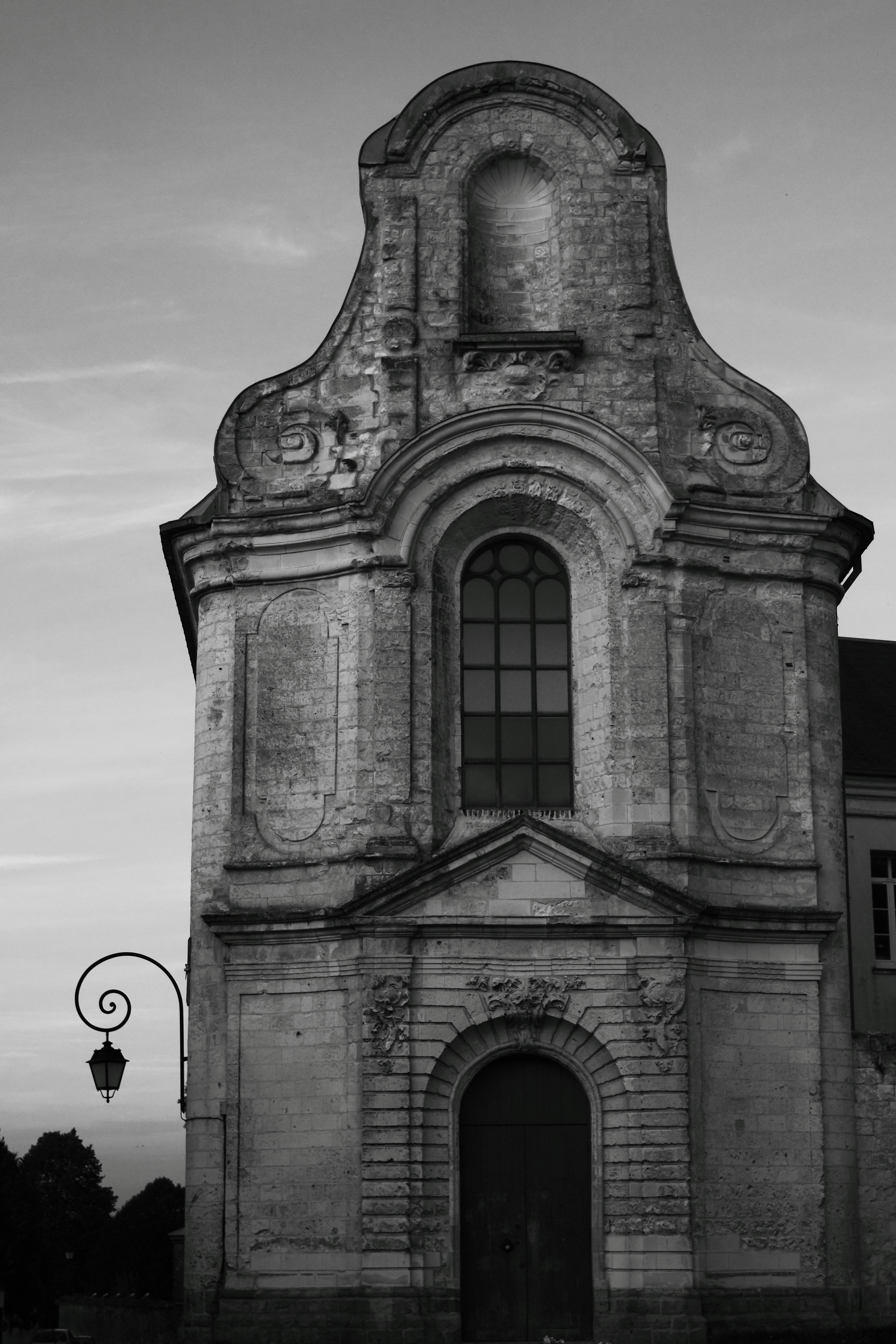
Chapelle Sainte-Austreberthe

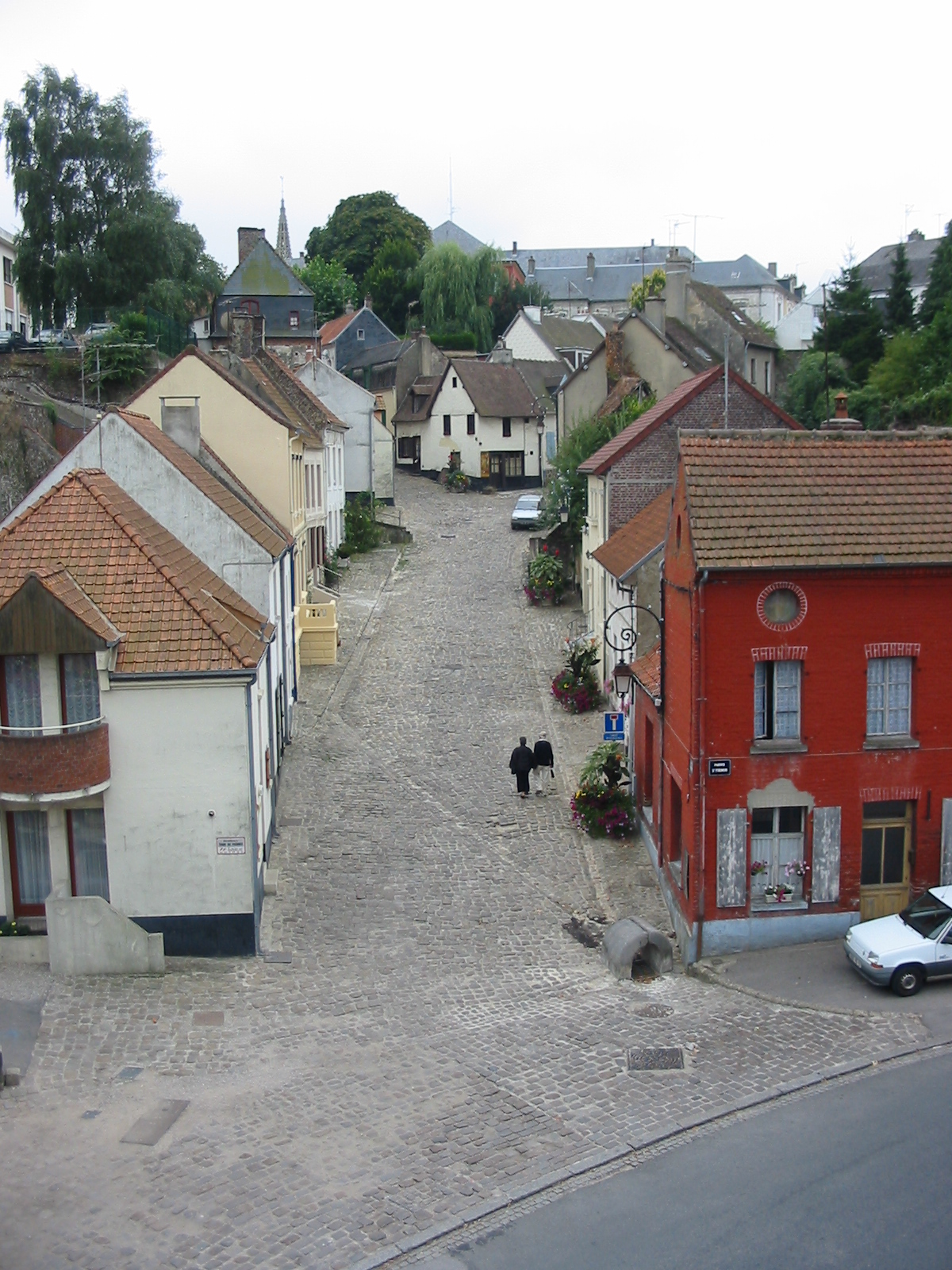
A street in Montreuil-sur-Mer

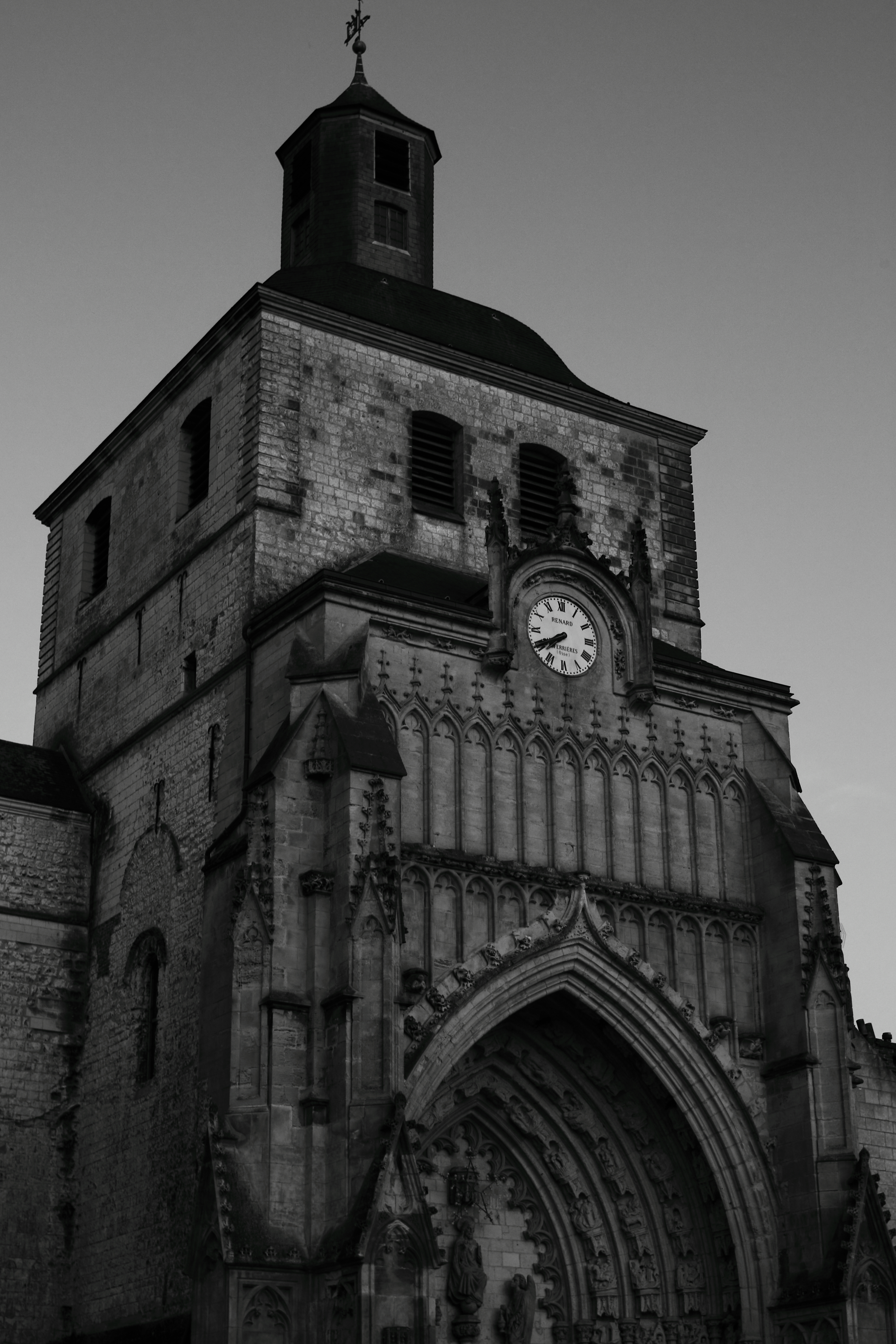
Église abbatiale Saint-Saulve

== See also ==
- Communes of the Pas-de-Calais department
