= 1918–19 Chelsea F.C. season =

English football club season

Chelsea
1918–19 season
- Chairman: Claude Kirby
- Manager: David Calderhead
- Stadium: Stamford Bridge
- London Combination: 6th
- London Victory Cup: Winners
- Top goalscorer: League: All: Joe Smith (21)
- Biggest win: 6–0 v Clapton Orient (12 October 1918)
- Biggest defeat: 2–6 v Fulham (1 March 1919)
| Home colours | Away colours |

The 1918–19 season was Chelsea Football Club's thirteenth year in existence. Due to the ongoing First World War, the Football League and the FA Cup were suspended so the club instead participated in the London Combination, an unofficial regional league mainly comprising teams from London. Results and statistics from these matches are not considered official. Chelsea finished 6th in the league, but did win the London Victory Cup.

Former Chelsea player Philip Smith was killed in action whilst fighting in the Western Front on 29 September 1918. George Lake died of wounds on 6 November 1918, five days before the armistice, two days after his battalion's attempt to cross the Sambre–Oise Canal near Frasnoy, France. He was buried in Frasnoy Communal Cemetery. Lake was one of the two last English footballers to die in the war, dying on the same day as Edward Thompson.
