= Guards Divisional Artillery =

Artillery formation of the British Army in World War I

- Royal Artillery cap badge
- Active: 18 August 1915–15 March 1919
- Country: United Kingdom
- Branch: New Army
- Role: Field Artillery
- Size: 2–4 Artillery brigades
- Part of: Guards Division
- Engagements: Battle of Loos; Battle of the Somme; Third Battle of Ypres; Battle of Cambrai; German Spring Offensive; Hundred Days Offensive

Commanders
- Notable commanders: Brig-Gen Alexander Wardrop, CMG; Brig-Gen Francis Wilson, CMG, DSO

The Guards Divisional Artillery (abbreviated to 'Guards DA' or 'GDA') was a force of field artillery raised in Ireland as part of Kitchener's Army early in World War I. Assigned to the Guards Division on the Western Front, it took part in the battles of Loos, the Somme, Ypres, Cambrai, the German Spring Offensive, the final Hundred Days Offensive and then the postwar Occupation of the Rhineland.

== Organisation and training ==
On 6 August 1914, less than 48 hours after Britain's declaration of war, Parliament sanctioned an increase of 500,000 men for the Regular British Army, and the newly appointed Secretary of State for War, Earl Kitchener of Khartoum issued his famous call to arms: 'Your King and Country Need You', urging the first 100,000 volunteers to come forward. This group of six divisions with supporting arms became known as Kitchener's First New Army, or 'K1'. Recruitment was rapid and the 'K2' units followed shortly after, including 16th (Irish) Division authorised on 11 September. The divisional artillery (Note: The artillery component of a British infantry division during World War I was commanded by a brigadier-general and was effectively a brigade, but was never referred to as such because 'brigade' was the term used by the Royal Artillery to designate a regimental-sized unit, of which there were initially four in each division.) for this formation (16th (I) DA) was quickly raised at Cahir, Fermoy and Kilkenny in September, though there was a shortage of Irish recruits for the artillery and many of the gunners were from England. The divisional artillery had the following planned organisation:

- LXXIV Brigade, Royal Field Artillery (RFA):
  - 232, 233, 234 Batteries
  - LXXIV Brigade Ammunition Column (BAC)
- LXXV Brigade, RFA
  - 235, 236, 237 Btys
  - LXXV BAC
- LXXVI Brigade, RFA
  - 238, 239, 240 Btys
  - LXXVI BAC
- LXXVII (Howitzer) Brigade, RFA
  - 241 (H), 242 (H) 243 (H) Btys
  - LXXVII (H) BAC
- 16th Heavy Battery, Royal Garrison Artillery (RGA)
- 16th Divisional Ammunition Column (DAC)

The three numbered batteries in each field brigade were to be equipped with six guns each (18-pounder guns or 4.5-inch howitzers), but on 23 January 1915 they were reorganised as four batteries of four guns, lettered A, B, C, D in each brigade. Brigadier-General C.E. Goulburn was appointed Commander, Royal Artillery (CRA) for 16th (I) Division on 25 October 1914. The training of 16th (I) Division progressed slowly, and initially the artillery 'had neither guns, dial sights, directors, nor harness for the horses'. It was some months before the batteries were able to obtain even 15 horses each, let alone guns. In January 1915 B/LXXVII (H) Bty had to do its gun drill with a single 12-pounder muzzle-loading cannon. In a change of policy heavy batteries were removed from divisional artillery, and 16th Hvy Bty left, landing in France on 10 July 1915 and serving independently on the Western Front for the rest of the war. The field brigades and DAC began crossing from Ireland to England in July to complete their training at the Larkhill ranges on Salisbury Plain. However, the rest of the division was still delayed, and in August it was decided to send 16th (I) DA (less LXXVII (H) Bde, which had only just arrived on Salisbury Plain) to France to become the divisional artillery for a new Guards Division that was being assembled within the British Expeditionary Force (BEF).

Guards Divisional Artillery was formed at Rollestone Camp on 18 August, with Headquarters (HQ), LXXIV, LXXV and LXXVI Bdes and the DAC transferred from 16th (I) DA. The missing howitzer brigade was supplied by LXVI (H) Bde, which had been left behind when 11th (Northern) Division had sailed for Gallipoli in June. The composition of Guards DA on formation was therefore as follows:

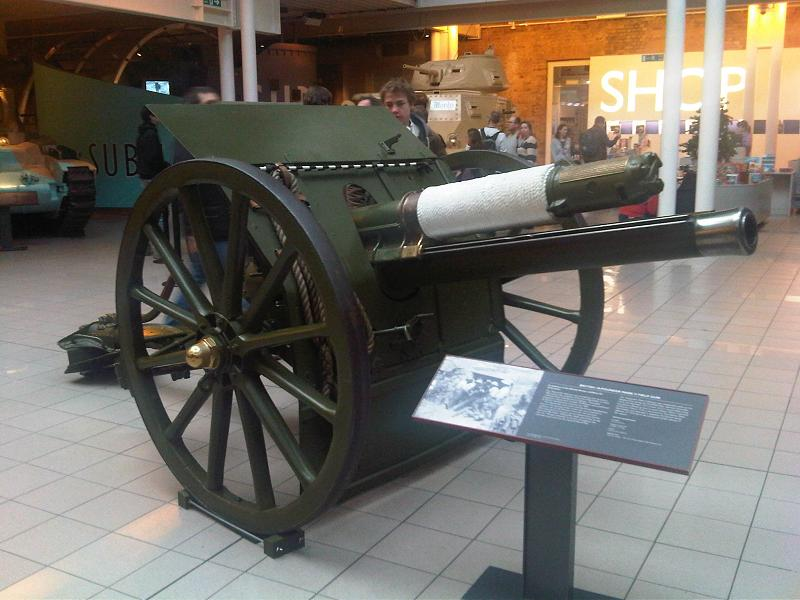
18-pounder preserved at the Imperial War Museum.

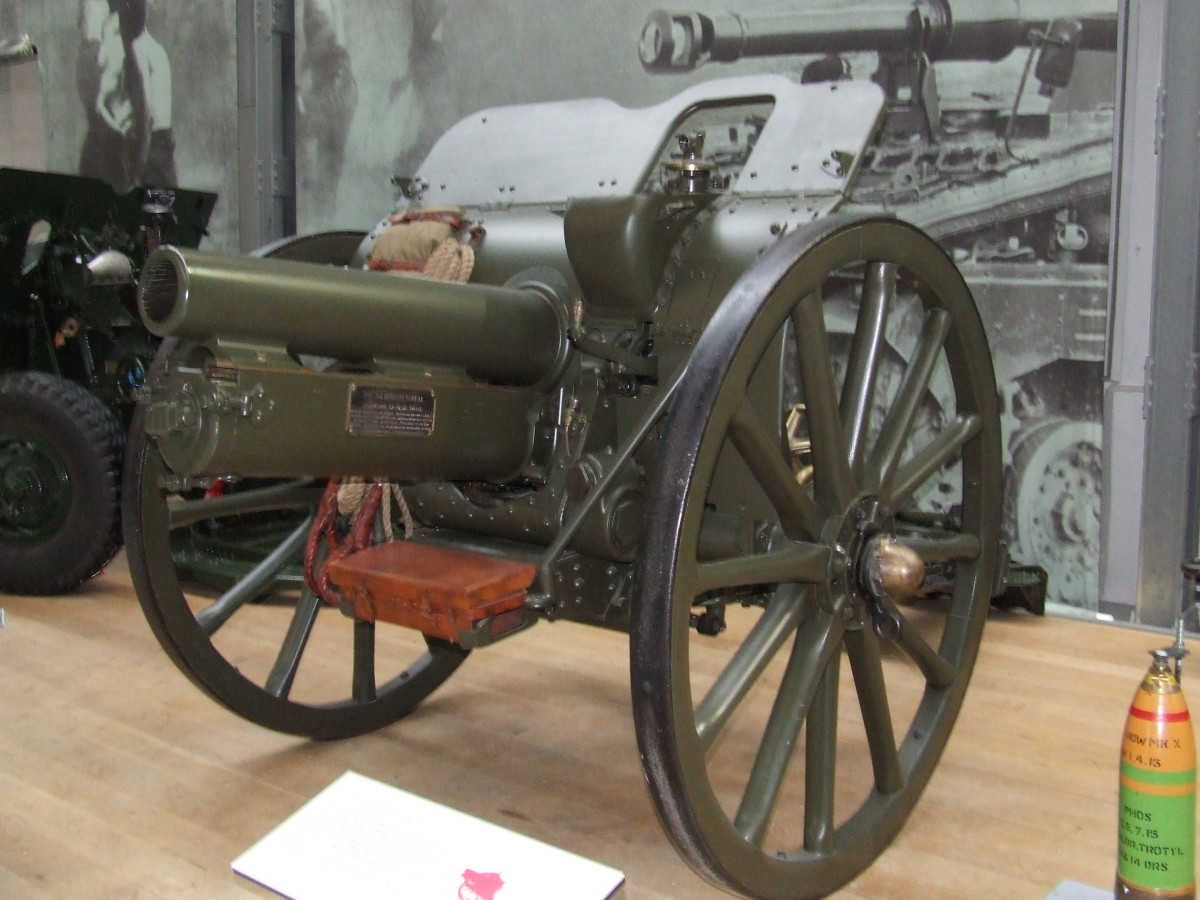
4.5-inch howitzer at the Royal Artillery Museum.

- LXI (H) Bde – Lieutenant-Colonel G.N. Cartwright
  - A, B, C, D (H) Btys – 4 x 4.5-inch howitzers each
  - LXI (H) BAC
- LXXIV Bde – Lt-Col L.P. Garden
  - A, B, C, D Btys – 4 x 18-pdrs each
  - LXXIV BAC
- LXXV Bde – Lt-Col Frederick Thackeray
  - A, B, C, D Btys – 4 x 18-pdrs each
  - LXXV BAC
- LXXVI Bde – Col Russell Gubbins
  - A, B, C, D Btys – 4 x 18-pdrs each
  - LXXVI BAC
- Guards DAC – Lt-Col H. Fawcus

Guards Division's commander, the Earl of Cavan, was conscious of the inexperience of his artillery and wanted the best RA officers to command it. Brigadier-Gen Goulburn who had trained 16th (I) DA became CRA of Guards Division on 30 August, but was replaced on 13 September by Brig-Gen Alexander Wardrop who had experience in the recent fighting. Colonel Gubbins, a recalled reserve officer, was later replaced as Commanding Officer (CO) of LXXVI Bde by Lt-Col G.R.V. Kinsman. Major D. Le P. Trench was appointed Brigade major of Guards DA on its formation.

== Western Front ==
LXI (H) Brigade was the first unit to leave Rollestone Camp, entraining at Amesbury on 22 August for Southampton Docks, where it embarked on the transports Mona's Queen, Nirvana and Austrialand. It landed at Le Havre next morning and went by train to Saint-Omer. It was followed by HQ, the 18-pounder brigades and the DAC from 27 August, and the whole force was billeted in villages around the divisional concentration at Lumbres by 4 September.

Most of the infantry units of Guards Division had been serving on the Western Front since the beginning of the war, but some battalions were newly arrived from England and the division was undergoing training to integrate these. None of the artillery units had any experience, and thus soon after arrival LXI (H) and LXXIV Bdes were sent up to First Army's area for a week's introduction to front line duties with the Meerut and Lahore Divisions respectively. By 18 September all the batteries had been through this process, and 2nd Guards Brigade carried out a field exercise with the DA. Next day Guards Division received its orders to take over a sector of the front line south of Aire.

=== Loos ===
Guards Division was assigned as the final reserve for the BEF's forthcoming offensive (the Battle of Loos), and secretly moved up by night marches to the neighbourhood of Allouage, 6 miles (9.7 km) west of Béthune, ready to advance behind the first reserves (21st and 24th Divisions) when required. The reserve divisions contributed a few field brigades to the preliminary bombardments, Guards DA sending LXXV Bde forward on 19 September for this purpose. Meanwhile, the rest of the division continued its preparations, LXXVI Bde carrying out a field exercise with 3rd Guards Brigade on 21 September. The offensive was launched on 25 September and the GDA began its approach march next day, taking over the infantry's bivouacs at Nœux-les-Mines. After struggling along roads choked by 21st and 24th Division's columns, Guards Division launched its own attack on 27 September, when Brig-Gen Wardrop had the guns of 21st and 24th Divisions as well as his own under command. LXXVI Brigade supporting 3rd Guards Bde took up positions near 'Quality Street' and engaged targets between the 'Chalk Pits' and Hill 70. In the afternoon the battery commanders established their observation posts (OPs) in the prominent coal mine winding gear known as the 'Pylon'. However, LXI (H) Bde at the rear of the column never came into action. The division's attack was a partial success, 2nd Gds Bde being pushed back from its furthest advance among the coal pits, and 3rd Gds Bde digging in on the nearer slope of Hill 70. The division renewed its attack on the pits on 28 September, the artillery putting down a hurricane bombardment on the objective just before zero, but without success. 24th DA was withdrawn on 29 September and LXI (H) Bde came into action. Guards DA set up an advanced HQ at Quality Street and LXXIV and LXXV Bdes reconnoitred new positions, while LXXVI Bde came temporarily under 21st DA. Guards Division consolidated its position before being relieved on 30 September.

While Guards Division's infantry rested, the guns remained in position around Quality Street and Mazingarbe, digging in and registering various targets. Guards DA's four brigades together with one brigade of 24th DA constituted the left group of the artillery concentrated under Brig-Gen Wardrop's command. The Guards infantry came back into the line for a proposed attack on 3–4 October, for which a 3-day preliminary bombardment was planned, but the enemy recaptured the Hohenzollern Redoubt and the infantry were rushed north to deal with this, while the GDA remained in place covering the troops of 12th (Eastern) Division. On 5 October LXXV Bde was heavily shelled, with some damage, the gunners taking shelter in nearby trenches. Lieutenant-Col Thackeray of LXXV Bde was admitted to hospital with pneumonia on 8 October (he died on 15 October. (Note: Lieutenant-Col Frederick Thackeray was buried at Etretat Churchyard near No 1 General Hospital.)) and was replaced by Lt-Col A.B. Bethell on 8 October. On 8 October a registration shell fired by LXI (H) Bde caused a huge explosion and column of smoke in the enemy-held village of Cité St Elie. Later that day the guns fired barrages on pre-arranged targets around the Puits and Hill 70 against enemy attacks developing against 12th (E) Division. These attacks had been halted by nightfall. The British resumed their offensive on 13 October and the GDA fired a bombardment with observation aircraft in support of 12th (E) Division's attack on the Quarries and Hulluch, which made limited progress. The capture of the Quarries was completed on the night of 17/18 October. Two nights later GDA's brigades moved north to Annequin, Cambrin and Vermelles to relieve 28th DA in support of Guards Division, which was holding the line after the bitter Action of the Hohenzollern Redoubt.

Guards Division was relieved to rest billets on 26/27 October, but the batteries remained in the line under 12th (E) DA. On 8 November Guards Division began relieving the Lahore Division north of the La Bassée Canal and the GDA moved to support it, with HQ at La Gorgue and the brigades billeted west of Merville and south of the Forêt de Nieppe. The DAC moved up from Nœux-les-Mines to Lestrem and later Robermetz. Trenches in this area were flooded and the division had to repair crumbling breastworks and communications. The divisional defence scheme involved defended localities rather than continuous lines, backed by a strong counter-attack force. Guards DA was to support the counter-attacks with all available guns, but in case of German breakthrough the batteries were to withdraw to prepared positions in the rear, leaving four single guns for close support. In the event the Germans made no serious attack, confining themselves to intermittent bombardments and mining. Lord Cavan ordered the DA to reserve its fire for prompt and heavy retaliation, or for special targets. For example, C/LXI (H), B/LXXIV and C/LXXVI Btys bombarded an enemy-held mine crater on 23 November, and next day A/ and B/LXI (H) and D/LXXVI Btys damaged a German blockhouse and blew a wide gap in the enemy breastworks and barbed wire at Sign Post Lane using the new high explosive (HE) shells. The gap was then sprayed with machine gun fire and occasional Shrapnel shells throughout the night to prevent repair. The artillery kept certain lanes clear through the enemy wire so that patrols and raiding parties could come and go, and provided supporting fire for these raids. For example, on 11 December B/LXXVI Bty fired a 'circular' barrage to protect an infantry raid on Sign Post Lane. Enemy working parties and anti-aircraft batteries were also targeted. On 27 November Lt-Col Kinsman of LXXVI Bde was placed in command of the GDA's Right Group, while Lt-Col Bethell of LXXV Bde took over Left Group; the brigade HQs moved to Laventie. On 29 November Right Group and a 60-pounder battery of the RGA bombarded a blockhouse and steel cupola, but really needed 6-inch howitzers to damage the blockhouse. The routine of trench warfare and minor operations continued throughout the winter, the crews sometimes being flooded out of their gun pits.

=== Reorganisation ===
Guards Division was posted to a new XIV Corps (commanded by the Earl of Cavan) in Second Army and on 14 February 1916 began moving north to join it in the Ypres Salient. It was not immediately required in the front line, and spent several weeks in corps reserve, at rest and training. The CRA's HQ and LXXVI Bde were at Zegerscappel, the other brigades at Kroonhuys (LXI (H)), Rubrouck (LXXIV Bde) and Arnèke (LXXV Bde). The DAC was first established at Ebblinghem, then in the area between Arnèke and Ledringhem.

On 21 February D/LXI (H) Bty with a proportion of the DAC was transferred to 50th (Northumbrian) Division. On 29 February Brig-Gen Wardrop was promoted to be Corps CRA for XIV Corps and next day Brig-Gen W. Evans succeeded him as CRA of Guards Division.

Three medium trench mortar batteries (TMBs) (Note: Unlike some divisions, Guards DA did not refer to the group of TMBs as a brigade, but simply 'Guards Divisional Trench Mortar Batteries'.) were formed in March 1916: one manned by infantry drawn from 1st Guards Bde and trained at the Divisional School of Explosives, the remainder by the RFA. Each battery consisted of 4 x 2-inch Medium Mortars. They were designated X/, Y/, and Z/Gds Btys. A heavy battery (V/Gds) with French 240 mm trench mortars was formed in May. The Guards TMBs were commanded by the Divisional Trench Mortar Officer (DTMO).

=== Trench warfare ===
One battery of LXXIV Bde went into action at Ypres under 20th (Light) Division at the beginning of March, but the remainder of the GDA remained at rest until 14 March, when orders arrived for Guards Division to take over the front line from Bellewaarde Stream to Wieltje Farm. Guards DA, in two groups, took up positions in the northern outskirts of Ypres, with the CRA's HQ at Poperinge and the DAC at Peselhoek just to the north of that village. The ammunition was dumped close to the guns and the DAC remained empty, the men being employed for various fatigue duties. Arriving reinforcements were initially posted to the DAC, and later reposted to brigades as required. The guns were positioned and began registering on 19 March. Both side's artillery was very active around the Salient. The batteries expended great efforts in fortifying their gun positions and OPs against frequent enemy counter-battery (CB) fire, which caused some damage. The batteries' usual targets were enemy working parties, suspected HQs and OPs, or retaliatory fire on their trenches. Batteries would also assign single guns to 'snipe' enemy crossroads and railway crossings. Because the DA's fire had little effect in keeping down enemy shelling, a special bombardment was carried out on 4 April by the corps heavy artillery with the howitzers of LXI Bde, while the 18-pdr batteries of the GDA harassed communication trenches with shrapnel and later fired bursts on the bombarded targets to hamper repair. This bombardment should have gone on all day, but bad weather reduced visibility, so it was resumed on 5 April, causing considerable damage to the enemy first and second defence systems. Thereafter, German artillery fire remained persistent, but was less concentrated, except when they attempted a raid on 19 April.The routine continued, with registration, retaliatory fire and shoots against targets of opportunity identified by the OPs, such as working parties or transport.

On 15–16 May 1916 the field brigades were reorganised in line with new BEF policy. LXI Brigade transferred one of its howitzer batteries to each of the 18-pdr brigades to become D (H) Bty in each and received their 18-pdr D Btys in return. At the same time the BACs were abolished and absorbed into the DAC, which was reorganised into A Echelon (Nos 1–3 Sections) and B Echelon (No 4 Section) under divisional and corps control respectively; No 1 Section was responsible for supplying small arms ammunition (SAA) to the infantry brigades. LXI (H) Brigade (and probably others) took the opportunity to bring its batteries up to strength with men and horses from its BAC before transferring the surplus to the DAC. At this point Guards DA was organised as follows:

- LXI Bde
  - A Bty (ex D/LXXIV) – 4 x 18-pdrs
  - B Bty (ex D/LXXV) – 4 x 18-pdrs
  - C Bty (ex D/LXXVI) – 4 x 18-pdrs
- LXXIV Bde
  - A, B, C Btys – each 4 x 18-pdrs
  - D (H) Bty (ex A/LXI) – 4 x 4.5 inch
- LXXV Bde
  - A, B, C Btys – each 4 x 18-pdrs
  - D (H) Bty (ex B/LXI) – 4 x 4.5 inch

- LXXVI Bde
  - A, B, C Btys – each 4 x 18-pdrs
  - D (H) Bty (ex C/LXI) – 4 x 4.5 inch
- Gds TMBs
  - X, Y, Z Btys – each 4 x medium mortars
  - V Bty – 4 x heavy mortars
- Gds DAC
  - A Echelon
  - B Echelon

The trench routine continued until 21 May, when the GDA was relieved. The batteries handed their guns in position over to the relieving units and went by motor bus to the waggon lines at Arnèke, from where the DAC's General Service (GS) waggons took the men to their rest billets. Over the following weeks they undertook training, particularly for signallers, forward observation officers (FOOs) and battery staff. Only B/LXXIV Bty remained in action, taking over the guns of a battery attached to 6th Division; it was relieved and rejoined its brigade at the beginning of June. On 3 June LXXVI Bde received orders to move to Calais for instruction, but this was cancelled the next day because part of Guards Division was being rushed back to Ypres where a German attack had penetrated the Canadian Corps line at Sanctuary Wood. LXXV Brigade had returned from instruction at Cap Gris-Nez and D (H)/LXXV Bty had just sent four of its guns for repair when the battery was ordered up to the front. Borrowing two guns from D (H)/LXXVII it marched back to Ypres and prepared gun positions a few hundred yards south of the Menin Gate. The battery came into action at midnight on 8/9 June and began registration before taking part in a concentrated two-day bombardment of German positions between Hill 60 and the 'Bird Cage' on 12 and 13 June. During this fighting the rest of the GDA remained at Arnèke and Ledringhem.

Guards Division returned to the line on 18 June, occupying the Canal Bank positions in the north of the Salient, with the GDA taking over the guns of 6th DA in position. The battery positions were outside Ypres on the Wieltje road, the DAC establishing a large forward ammunition dump. Second Army now adopted a more offensive policy, to divert attention away from the 'Big Push' being prepared on the Somme. On 24 June Left Group of guns covering Guards Division's front bombarded the German line, cutting three gaps in the wire and four breaches in the parapet, after which 3rd Gds Bde carried out a raid and advanced their line by about 200 yards (180 m). Both groups repeated the operation on 27 June and after that the gaps were kept open by systematic shell and machine gun fire, and were used by nightly raiding parties and patrols. On 1 July the 18-pdr batteries cut the wire round a German post at Morteldje Estaminet at the crossroads of 'Admiral's Road' from Wieltje and 'Boundary Road' running north from Ypres, while 24th Heavy Artillery Group, RGA, shelled 'High Command Redoubt' behind. That night concentrated fire from the 4.5-inch howitzers, primarily D (H)/LXIV Bty (Z/Gds TMB was unable to get into position in time), supported a raid by 1st Battalion, Welsh Guards, while the 18-pdrs fired shrapnel to cover the flanks. The Welsh Guards succeeded in capturing the post but under heavy fire from German artillery and Minenwerfers were forced to evacuate it the following day. Left Group was relieved by 6th DA on 5 July and went back to Proven, but this was reversed two days later, and the batteries returned to wire-cutting, firing on working parties and exchanging retaliatory fire with enemy Minenwerfers.

=== Somme ===
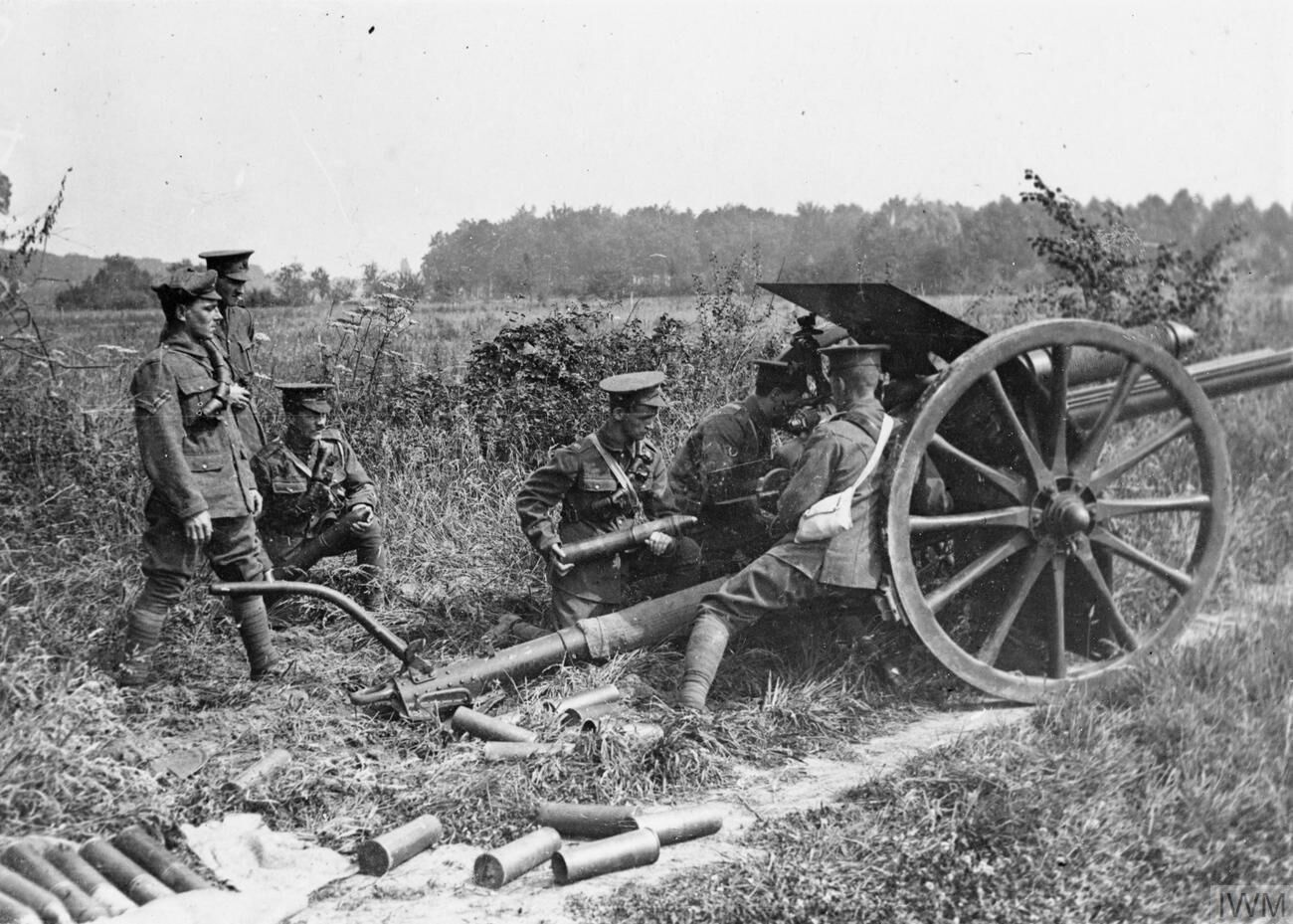
18-pounder in action on the Somme.

The Somme Offensive had opened on 1 July, and XIV Corps was sent to reinforce Reserve Army in this fighting. Guards Division was relieved on 27 July and moved south by train. By 31 July it was billeted round Doullens, with GDA HQ in Bus-lès-Artois, the brigades around Authie and the DAC at Coigneux. The division occupied the line opposite Serre and Beaumont-Hamel, where there had been fierce fighting on 1 July but was now a quiet sector while Fourth Army continued the offensive further south. Nevertheless, there were exchanges of fire and a number of casualties. On 8 and 14 August XIV Corps laid on gas discharges and heavy bombardments as diversions. During the month XIV Corps' divisions were put at the disposal of Fourth Army and Guards Division began moving south to join that army, but the GDA did not follow immediately. On 21 August 2nd Division's bomb store at Coigneux caught fire, and large quantities of ammunition of all types held by the DAC blew up, wrecking the village. Guards DA pulled out on 28–29 August, and withdrew to billets around Thièvres to overhaul equipment. It marched to Sailly-le-Sec on 1 September and on 4–6 September took over gun positions from 24th DA around Bernafay Wood and Trônes Wood, with HQ at 'Minden Post'. Immediately the batteries began firing SOS barrages south of Guillemont and round Leuze Wood, where fighting continued, but were hampered by the poor telephone circuits they took over and the unclear positions of friendly troops. The infantry of Guards Division were due to come up from reserve to take part in the forthcoming Battle of Flers–Courcelette, but first the GDA reinforced by two brigades from 6th DA supported 16th (I) Division in a preliminary attack (the Battle of Ginchy). LXI and LXXV Brigades were in Left Group under Lt-Col Frank Buzzard (LXI Bde), while LXXIV and LXXVI were in Right Group under 6th DA. (The TMBs found the country impracticable for their weapons, so the men worked on road repair and new gun positions.) The infantry of 16th (I) Division attacked at 16.45 on 9 September, preceded by a Creeping barrage fired by half the 18-pdrs, the other half firing a standing barrage in front, while the howitzers kept selected areas such as the orchards in Ginchy under fire. The attack was a success, but the guns remained busy as the Germans launched persistent counter-attacks. Guards Division's infantry relieved 16th (I) Division on the night of 9/10 September in preparation for the forthcoming battle.

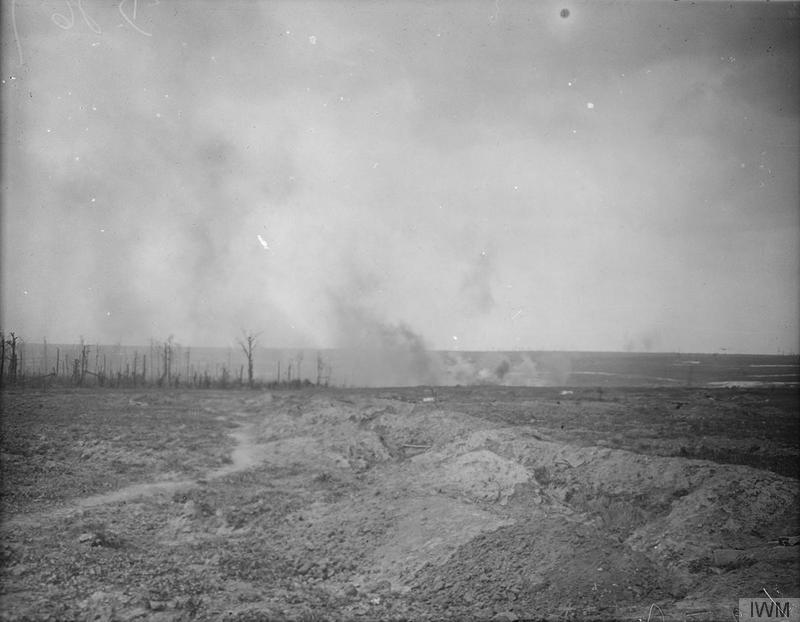
The bombardment of Ginchy, 9 September 1916, photographed from Trônes Wood by John Warwick Brooke.

As Guards Division took over the newly won Ginchy salient, GDA HQ moved up to Bernafay Wood. Buzzard's Left Group supporting 1st Gds Bde consisted of LXI and LXXVI Bdes and one from 6th DA. Right Group under Lt-Col Bethell had LXXIV, LXXV and one of 6th DA to support 2nd Gds Bde. The DAC at Carnoy prepared advanced ammunition dumps for the operation, for which it had to supply all six RFA brigades. Guards Division was given a sequence of four objectives from Ginchy to Lesbœufs. The artillery bombardment began on 12 September, the field guns mainly employed for wire cutting in daylight and harassing fire at night. The attack was launched on 15 September when the bombardment suddenly became intense at Zero (06.20). The advance was preceded by half the field guns firing a Creeping barrage falling 30 yards (27 m) in front of the infantry and advancing at a rate of 50 yards (46 m) per minute. Three clear lanes 100 yards (91 m) wide were left in this barrage for the columns of tanks (making their first appearance in battle) to advance. The other half of the guns fired standing barrages ahead of the advance; these lifted forwards when the creeping barrage reached each barrage line. The howitzers fired on selected targets. Unfortunately, most of the 10 tanks of C Company, Tanks Corps, advancing with the Guards either broke down or got lost, the infantry were raked in enfilade from unsuppressed machine guns on their flanks, and many got lost amongst the featureless shell-churned countryside, 1st Battalion Coldstream Guards walking into their own creeping barrage. As early as 08.30 the 18-pdr batteries of LXXVI Bde were ordered to cease firing and move up to pre-prepared forward positions between Delville Wood and Ginchy, with HQ near Guillemont Station under command of 1st Gds Bde. Coming into action again at 14.40 it turned its guns onto enemy infantry reported to be massing for a counter-attack. LXXIV Brigade was ordered to follow up at 10.30; the batteries moved off at 20-minute intervals and came under 2nd Gds Bde; LXI Bde also made a considerable advance, and two sections of the DAC moved up to Trônes Wood. However, having suffered heavy casualties 1st Guards Bde could not get beyond the Brown Line, the second of its four objectives, and the Groups were ordered to bring the barrages back from the Blue Line to help the infantry maintain what they had gained. With no further advance possible, LXXIV and LXXVI Bdes reverted to Group command. Next day 3rd Gds Bde continued the attack, but was late coming up, and received little benefit from the standing barrage provided for it. After the Guards infantry were relieved on the night of 16/17 September, the GDA remained in the line supporting an attack next day by 20th (L) Division.

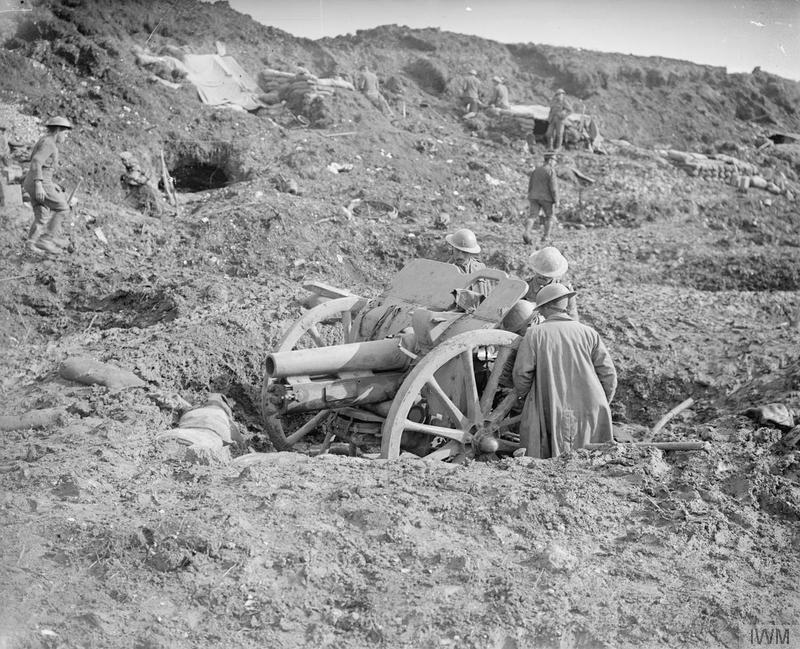
4.5-inch howitzer dug into a shellhole after the Battle of Flers-Courcelette.

From 18 September the GDA was engaged in wire-cutting for the next phase of the offensive, as well as directing irregular bursts of fire where the enemy were suspected of working on their defences. Preparations were delayed by bad weather, and some of the batteries moving forward to shorten the range found themselves stuck in the mud for hours, but on 21–23 September the weather was clear enough for observation aircraft to assist the brigades in registering targets behind enemy lines. Most of the DAC moved up from Carnoy to Maricourt. The delayed Battle of Morval began on 25 September, with the GDA and its attached brigades providing creeping and standing barrages to cover 3rd Gds Bde in its successful Capture of Lesbœufs. That night they carried out night firing on the enemy's new line and the tracks behind it, and some batteries moved forward again. On 27 September the GDA fired a creeping barrage as 21st Division completed the Capture of Gueudecourt. That night a German aircraft bombed the waggon lines at Carnoy, LXXVI Bde and No 3 Section DAC (left behind on 24 September) suffering badly, with the loss of over 100 horses killed and badly injured. No 3 Section also suffered casualties on 7 October when the advanced dump at Trônes Wood was shelled. Guards Division was relieved at the end of September, but the artillery remained in the line for another month, supporting XIV Corps in the Battle of the Transloy Ridges. By early October the batteries were getting out of range, and they began work on new forward positions. They fired in support of small operations against 'Cloudy', 'Rainy' and 'Rainbow' trenches, and LXXVI Bde fired for other minor operations on 14 and 18 October. The attack against 'Eclipse' and 'Zenith' trenches in front of Le Transloy by 8th Division on 23 October, supported by a creeping barrage, had to be delayed by several hours because morning mist blinded the OPs. Much of the other firing over the month was by the howitzers against these trench objectives, while the 18-pdr gunners worked to improve gun pits, ammunition pits and dugouts. After a succession of wet days in late October the roads and tracks become impassable and ammunition had to be brought up by pack animals. LXI Brigade's advanced HQ at Ginchy was flooded out. On 31 October LXXVI Bde's gunners were withdrawn to rest at 'The Citadel', leaving guards on their guns, but the rest of GDA remained in action. Eclipse and Zenith trenches were finally captured on 2–3 November by 17th (Northern) Division, and subsequent counter-attacks driven off with the help of the artillery. Trench fighting continued, then on the night of 10/11 November the GDA's brigades and DAC handed over their guns and ammunition in position and marched back to Méaulte to reorganise.

=== Winter 1916–17 ===
On 14 November the field brigades at Méaulte were reorganised into 6-gun batteries: in LXXIV Bde C Bty was split between A and B, in LXXV B was split between A and C, and in LXXVI A was split between B and C. In addition, D (H)/LXXVI was split between D (H)/LXXIV and D (H)/LXXV. LXI Brigade HQ was disbanded, its the three batteries being reorganised into two, which became C/LXXIV and B/LXXV. LXXVI Brigade remained temporarily understrength with only two batteries. After the Somme, General Headquarters (GHQ) had decided that it needed a reserve of field artillery to reinforce parts of the front without breaking up divisional artillery. Each infantry division contributed one of its RFA brigades to become independent Army Field Artillery (AFA) brigades in this reserve. LXXVI therefore became LXXVI AFA Bde on 19 January 1917, with No 3 Section from the DAC as its BAC, and left the division. The TMBs remained unchanged. Guards DA therefore had the following organisation:

- LXXIV Bde
  - A, B, C Btys – each 6 x 18-pdrs
  - D (H) Bty – 6 x 4.5 inch
- LXXV Bde
  - A, B, C Btys – each 6 x 18-pdrs
  - D (H) Bty – 6 x 4.5 inch

For the rest of November 1916 the field brigades rested and trained around Hangest, but on 23 November the DAC sent a section forward to work with the corps siege artillery. At the beginning of December LXXV and LXXVI Bdes took over positions from the French on the right around Frégicourt and Combles. They carried out the usual trench warfare tasks of registration, retaliation and harassing fire, with occasional intense bombardments of specific enemy positions. The DAC concentrated at Carnoy, with No 1 Section resuming its SAA work, and established ammunition dumps at 'Plateau Siding' and Combles. It then marched to 'Minden Post', near Albert, in early December. The TMBs constructed bomb store tunnels and new emplacements, and spent the second half of January in training. During January 1917 Guards DA was relieved by 20th (L) DA, but after a short rest relieved 8th DA further south round Maurepas. On 8 February the GDA fired creeping, standing and smoke barrages for an operation by the neighbouring 17th (N) Division, and again on 28 February for an attack by 29th Division on 'Potsdam Trench' and 'Palz Trench' in front of Sailly-Saillisel after four days of wirecutting. LXXIV Brigade in Haie Wood suffered a number of hostile bombardments directed by enemy observation aircraft, while on 16 February the XIV Corps ammunition dump at Plateau Sidings was bombed by a hostile aircraft and continued burning all day. The GDA carried out a number of destructive shoots on enemy trenches in conjunction with the corps heavy artillery. On the night of 7/8 March 18-pounder batteries laid a creeping barrage over No man's land to clear snipers who had been active there. In February Guards TMBs returned to fatigue duties, constructing OPs and dugouts, and in March they relieved 29th Division's TMBs in the line as Guards Division took over more of the line

The Germans on XIV Corps' front began a retreat to the Hindenburg Line (Operation Alberich) on the night of 13/14 March. Patrols discovered this next day, one of the first people into the empty enemy trench along St Pierre Vaast Wood being the FOO of D/LXXV Bty with an infantry patrol, who promptly reported the enemy withdrawal. Guards Division began following up, the GDA moving up to previously chosen positions. However, they were unable to do much firing to support the outpost line against German rearguards because their positions were not accurately known. On 17 March LXXIV Bde had a good target when a party of Germans were observed destroying dugouts west of St Martin's Wood. Although the gunners reconnoitred positions beyond St Pierre Vaast Wood, they were ordered to stand fast on 19 March after the division's patrols lost contact with the retreating enemy. XIV Corps Cavalry Regiment took over the pursuit, accompanied by Maj W.E Mann of B/LXXIV Bty as liaison officer (who was Mentioned in dispatches for his work with them). From 24 March to 6 May Guards Division was employed in repairing the road and rail communications across the old Somme battlefield and the devastated area left by the retreating Germans. The DAC supplied teams of pack animals to help salvage material from the battlefields, and B Echelon waggons to help the road repair parties. LXXIV Brigade handed over to LXXV Bde and withdrew to its waggon lines at Morlancourt on 25 March, apart from C Bty, which acted as the depot battery at XIV Corps Artillery School at Daours. On 30 March LXXV Bde also went to Morlancourt. The brigades and TMBs spent April resting, training, and calibrating their guns.

=== Messines ===
During May 1917 XIV Corps was transferred north to join Second Army as army reserve. Guards Division concentrated at Morlancourt and went by train to billets at Renescure near Saint-Omer. Second Army was planning a set-piece attack to capture the Messines–Wytschaete Ridge (the Battle of Messines). Massive artillery resources were gathered, and although XIV Corps was not going to be used for the operation, its divisional artilleries were made available for the attack. On 23 May the GDA marched to Strazeele where the field brigades and DAC came under the orders of 25th DA. They began preparing gun positions, suffering a number of casualties from enemy fire over the following days (three battery ammunition dumps of LXXV Bde and one of LXXIV were blown up). On 24 May the Guards TMBs began wirecutting for 19th (Western) Division. Meanwhile, Guards DAC was used for the huge build-up of ammunition. On 27 May a number of its waggons were delivering to dumps on the Wulverghem Road, which came under shellfire. A New Zealand Division SAA dump blew up, killing and wounding a number of DAC men and horses. However, even after the damage to their dumps, the two GDA brigades had 7800 18-pdr rounds and 6600 for 4.5s at their gun positions in time for Zero on 7 June. The batteries continued working on their gun positions and laying telephone lines until 2–3 June, and they registered their guns by 6 June. The 18-pdrs did not take part in the general bombardment, but the two howitzer batteries carried out bombardments with gas shells on 6 June. Brigadier-Gen W. Evans left on 27 May and on 7 June Lt-Col Francis Wilson (XCI Bde, 20th DA) was promoted to succeed him as CRA of Guards Division.

25th Division was on the right of the attack, with orders to advance from a point north of Ploegsteert Wood to the village of Messines. LXXIV and LXXV Bdes under Lt-Col Bethell formed 'N' Group of the artillery concentration on that part of the front. Barrage rehearsals were carried out on the afternoons of 3 and 5 June. British artillery fire died away about 02.40 on the morning of 7 June. Before dawn, at 03.10, the surprise element of the plan was revealed: the simultaneous explosion of 19 huge mines dug under the ridge, which blew the German front line system to bits before the infantry advanced. N Group's role was to fire standing barrages to keep all enemy defensive positions within 1,500 yards (1,400 m) of the infantry's jumping-off line under continuous fire until the creeping barrage reached them. At that point the guns joined in the creeping barrage, advancing at a rate varying from 100 yards (91 m) in 3 minutes to 100 yd in 5 minutes. Aided by the explosion of the 'Ontario Farm' mine and the artillery support, 25th Division had little difficulty in reaching its first objectives. It then pushed on to the Messines–Wytschaete road along the summit of the ridge, with the only serious opposition coming from a strongpoint at 'Hell Farm' near the top of the slope, which was captured after a sharp fight. The reserve brigade then went through and took the line beyond the ridge, including the 'Lumm Farm strongpoint'.The dust and smoke of the mines and barrages were so great that the FOO of N Group could see little, and even when observers were able to move forward to the ridge the observation was not good, obstructed by trees and hedges. A number of German batteries, which would have been easy targets, were not seen in time and were able to escape. N Group ceased fire at 13.00. However, Lt-Col Buzzard as liaison officer with 75th Infantry Bde reported an advance by enemy infantry, confirmed by balloon observers; a protective barrage shattered this counter-attack at 14.10. At 14.40 the rate of fire was increased to cover the next phase of the attack, by 4th Australian Division, who passed through 25th Division to complete the advance to the Oosttaverne Line. This bombardment developed into a creeping barrage at 15.10 when the Australians commenced their advance, Lt-Col Buzzard going forward with 13th Australian Infantry Bde. They were on most of their objectives before 17.30 and the batteries ceased firing. Although prepared to fire SOS tasks, no call was made on the GDA batteries during the night. Next day they engaged some enemy troop concentrations reported by observation aircraft, and a number of SOS calls were made on the night of 8/9 September but no serious counter-attack came in on their front. On 9 June Guards DA HQ resumed command of its units, which were withdrawn to Borre, and then to camp at Herzeele.

=== Ypres ===
XIV Corps took over the left (northern) part of the Ypres Salient under Fifth Army for the forthcoming Ypres Offensive, and Guards Division began moving into the Boesinghe sector on 15 June. Guards TMBs arrived at Boesinghe on 19 June and begun constructing emplacements. From 1 to 14 July one medium TMB carried out bombardment duties with 2-inch mortars while the others carried out fatigues and retrained on the new Newton 6-inch Mortar. V Heavy TMB was also re-equipped with both 9.45-inch Heavy Mortars and 'Super' 9.45-inch mortars with longer barrels. The mortars and ammunition were taken to Boesinghe Chateau by tramway, which could only operate at night because of enemy fire, and then carried into the line by infantry working parties. 29th and 56th (1st London) Division TMBs also came up to work on the emplacements under Guards DA. Guards DAC moved to camps in the woods at Peselhoek on 24 June and began taking ammunition and engineer supplies up at night to the forward dumps at Elverdinge in preparation for the offensive. The enemy regularly shelled the road, causing numerous casualties. The field brigades rested at Herzeele until late June, when LXXIV Bde came into action, carrying out routine shoots while constructing new forward positions, assisted by working parties from LXXV Bde while the DAC worked on new OPs. LXXV Brigade moved into action on 11 July, and with LXXIV Bde formed part of XIV Corps' Left Artillery, within which the GDA commanded Left Group and 29th DA Right Group. They registered their guns and began bombardments of enemy trenches on 15 July; particular targets were 'Cariboo Avenue', 'Baboon Trench', 'Canal Drive' and dugouts in 'Artillery Wood'. Enemy retaliation was strong, having the advantage of OPs on the Pilckem Ridge overlooking the British battery positions. The Germans first used their new Mustard gas against the BEF on 12 July and among the early victims were men of the GDA, subjected to a 3-hour rain of gas shells on the night of 17/18 July, particularly on LXXV Bde HQ. Lieutenant-Col Buzzard of LXXIV Bde was wounded on 23 July. The TMBs (Guards, 29th and 56th (1st L) Divisions) were very active, it having been decided that wire-cutting was best done by the mortars and howitzers; the new heavy mortars produced good results on 'hard' targets beyond the range or power of 2-inch mortars. By 25 July, the Guards TMBs had fired 326 rounds of 9.45-inch, 400 rounds of 6-inch, and 4500 rounds of 2-inch bombs, despite a hold-up in supply when an explosion in an ammunition dump on 17 July damaged the trench tramway up to Boesinghe Chateau. The 4.5-inch howitzers were also used against fortified woods, farms and concrete blockhouses ('pillboxes'), carrying out night gas bombardments of Abri Wood and the crossings over the Steenbeek stream. The 18-pdrs assisted with the wire-cutting and kept the damaged defences under intermittent fire to hinder repairs.

Guards Division's task for the attack appeared extremely difficult. The opposing trench lines were separated by the wide, mud-filled Yser Canal, which was a formidable obstacle. The troops then had to advance up the Pilckem Ridge to capture the German Second Line, continuing on to the Steenbeek stream beyond. To cover any further advance the field artillery would have to be moved forward. They practised crossing water obstacles and the Royal Engineers collected quantities of material to enable them to do so. However, on 27 July air patrols reported that the enemy had pulled back from their front line in front of Boesinge, apparently to avoid the continuous bombardments and gas attacks. That afternoon patrols sent out by the Guards Division confirmed this withdrawal, and they were able to occupy the German trenches across the canal on a wide frontage and to a depth of 500 yards (460 m). The range having been increased, all the TMBs except one medium battery in each artillery group were withdrawn next day and sent to help build and repair tracks up to the front line, or carry ammunition for the field batteries.

The first day of the offensive (the Battle of Pilckem Ridge) was on 31 July. At sunrise (03.50) the GDA reinforced by V Army Bde, Royal Horse Artillery, fired to cover the advance of 3rd Gds Bde on the left, 29th DA to cover 2nd Gds Bde on the right as far as the Ypres–Staden railway. The creeping barrage of shrapnel (described as 'magnificent') started as close to the jumping-off line as possible and then rolled forwards at a pace of 100 yards (91 m) in four minutes. There was one 18-pdr for every 15 yards (14 m) of the front. The barrage was in three phases: up to the capture of the Black Line (second objective), the advance from the Black Line to the Green Line (third objective), and then to the Green Dotted Line (final objective). The protective barrages of 18-pdrs and 4.5-inch howitzers were placed 500 yards (460 m) beyond each objective but were not stationary, 'searching' back and forward over the ground where the enemy might mount a counter-attack. Smoke barrages were also fired in front of the Black and Green lines. Despite opposition, the two Guards brigades reached the Green Line, and the 1st Gds Bde passed through to the final objective along the Steenbeek (where the barrage became ragged at extreme range) and established posts across it by 09.30. At 08.00 LXXIV Brigade had moved its batteries to forward positions at Gouvy Farm, where they came into action again at 10.15, though casualties, particularly among officers of A Bty, were high. During the day the Guards DAC had established advanced dumps at Turques Farm and Canal Bank, and men of the TMBs had repaired the tracks and carried ammunition across the canal by bridge and by aerial ropeway for those field batteries of XIV Corps that had crossed during the day (V AFA Bde RHA went over that night). On the corps' front the day had gone well, but rain set in during the evening, converting the shelled areas into a swamp.

As well as slowing movement and ammunition supply (from 1 August firing had to be limited to 100 rounds per gun per day), the wet weather hindered observation as the batteries tried to register targets along the new German line around Langemarck village. Although 29th DA's batteries were all across the canal by 5 August, LXXV Bde did not move across until 7 August, followed by LXXIV on 8 August when 29th Division's infantry relieved the Guards along the Steenbeek. The GDA came under the command of 29th DA for the next advance. Battery positions were heavily shelled, and high ammunition expenditure strained the ability of the horse teams to replenish it through the mud. 29th Division carried out a minor operation under a creeping barrage on 11 August to obtain a better 'jumping off' line on the far side of the Steenbeek. The next major attack (the Battle of Langemarck) was launched on 16 August. Advancing through the mud behind a slow barrage (100 yards (91 m) every 5 minutes) described as 'terrific and exact', 29th Division's infantry reached their objectives near Langemarck village and took up a line on the high ground 200 yards (180 m) short of the Broenbeek stream. The SOS barrage was arranged to fall 200 yards (180 m) beyond the stream, but the enemy massed for their counterattack between the British line and this barrage. An FOO at Craonne Farm realised the situation and informed 29th DA HQ: the batteries were turned onto the stream itself and scattered the enemy. In subsequent days the infantry pushed outposts beyond the stream. Three days later LXXIV Bde was able to advance C and D (H) Btys up to 'General's Farm', but next day the enemy bombardment as far back as Boesinge was too heavy to allow any more movement. These two batteries were under enemy observation, and were ordered to fire only in response to SOS calls. However, such calls were frequent, and even when no operations were taking place the batteries were firing a daily average of 600 rounds each, which put great pressure on the ammunition supply; from 30 August the daily ration was reduced to 50 rounds per gun. There was also a steady trickle of casualties from enemy shellfire: during August LXXIV Bde lost 64 officers and men, of whom 12 were killed. On 24 August D (H)/LXXV Bty was put out of action, three howitzers being practically destroyed, but a section was back in action three days later. On 26 August Guards Division relieved 29th Division once more, and the GDA resumed command of its own units, 29th DA's brigades being pulled out of the line for rest. LXXIV Brigade put down a barrage on the afternoon of 26 August to support an attack by the neighbouring 38th (Welsh) Division on 'Eagle Trench'. However, the attacking battalion had been lying out in shellholes that were filling with water, and when they tried to advance through the mud the barrage got away from them and they were unable to reach their objective.

Despite XIV Corps' successes on Fifth Army's north flank, the offensive had not gone well was now paused while Second Army took the lead and prepared for a resumption with new tactics when the weather improved. On 1 September a 160-strong detachment of the British West Indies Regiment (BWIR) was attached to the Guards DAC to replace some of the gunners. Many of them worked at Turque Farm Dump, which was bombed by German aircraft on 11 September, causing some casualties. The DAC and BWIR lost further casualties to shellfire over the following days. During September the GDA had seven field brigades under its command. Their targets in the shell-torn wilderness in front could be simply a hedge or a group of occupied shellholes, though on several nights practice creeping barrages were fired as diversions from minor operations and raids by the neighbouring corps. By now all of LXXIV Bde was round General's Farm, and LXXV was even further forward near the Ypres–Staden railway. On 14/15 September the Guards withdrew their outposts from across the Broembeek to allow the area to be thoroughly bombarded before an attack behind a creeping barrage the following afternoon to advance the line. On 17 September a massive 17-inch shell fell close to C/LXXIV Bty, temporarily burying a gun and its detachment, but without causing any casualties. When the offensive was renewed on 20 September (the Battle of the Menin Road Ridge) the Guards infantry played no part, though LXXIV and LXXV Bdes were in action for 42 hours continuously, firing creeping, 'combing', smoke and gas barrages to assist the attacking units of XIV Corps. Next day the Guards Division was relieved to rest, the GDA withdrawing its guns to the waggon lines and on 22 September marching to Herzeele. Here the DAC, assisted by the men of the TMBs, began constructing shelter for the waggon lines for the coming winter. During the month LXXIV Bde had fired 30,000 rounds, suffered 35 casualties and had 6 guns and 5 howitzers put out of action.

The two field brigades returned to the front on 30 September and the GDA came under 29th DA again the following day, forming part of Left Group for the Battle of Broodseinde (4 October), the DAC suffering casualties from shellfire as they brought up the ammunition and engineer supplies. The brigades fired a creeping barrage at 06.00 for the two battalions of 29th Division that took part in the attack while the remainder made a demonstration. Later they fired SOS barrages against counter-attacks, during which C/LXXIV suffered a number of casualties. The brigades then advanced to prepare new positions across the Steenbeek, with LXXIV Bde north of Abri Wood, and brought up ammunition for the Battle of Poelcappelle following on 9 October. The Guards infantry attacked at 05.20 and gained all their objectives easily, the FOOs moving up with them to Louvois Farm. XIV Corps attacked again at dawn on 12 October (the First Battle of Passchendaele), but the Guards had little to do, the batteries putting down a protective barrage for the left flank of the attack. The weather was now very wet, hampering all operations. The TMBs took part in the 9 October attack, but spent most of the month repairing tracks for the field guns and ammunition waggons. The Guards infantry were relieved by 35th Division on 17 October, but Brig-Gen Wilson and GDA HQ continued to command all the artillery on the divisional front. On 20 October LXXIV Bde took over the guns of another brigade at Tuff's Farm in the muddy Steenbeek valley, and both GDA howitzer batteries took part in a special gas bombardment before 35th Division attacked towards Houthulst Forest on 22 October. Two days later the GDA began a 48-hour bombardment to prepare for the next attack. By now LXXIV Bde was in new positions on the Broembeek, where a light railway simplified ammunition supply. The attack on 26 October (the Second Battle of Passchendaele) was on the right of 35th Division and the GDA was not called on to any great extent. It fired the following day to support the French on the left, and on 28 and 30 October took part in barrages to support advances on the right towards Passchendaele village. By the end of the month LXXIV Bde alone had suffered 79 casualties and 15 damaged guns. The waggon lines were a sea of mud and many of the drivers began to suffer from Trench foot.

=== Cambrai ===
On 26 October the BEF was ordered to send reinforcements to the Italian Front following the Battle of Caporetto, and XIV Corps HQ was among the formations provided. Guards Division did not accompany it, but instead was sent south to join Third Army, which was preparing for a renewed offensive. The Guards infantry had been in rest billets since 17 October, but the GDA brigades were not withdrawn to their waggon lines until 3 November, and began their long march three days later. They caught up with the rest of the division at St Pol on 12 November, and by 19 November were in reserve at Courcelles. Third Army launched the offensive (the Battle of Cambrai) next day with a surprise attack led by massed tanks. On 21 November Guards Division was moved to Achiet-le-Petit to be closer to the fighting, and on the night of 23/24 November it relieved 51st (Highland) Division in the line between Cantaing and the corner of Bourlon Wood. The following morning the GDA moved up to the south-west corner of Havrincourt Wood, ready to reinforce the four RFA brigades already in position. The DAC took over 51st (H) DAC's ammunition dumps and bomb stores in Havrincourt Wood.

Bourlon Wood had remained in enemy hands after the initial attacks. On the morning of 25 November Guards Division attacked into the wood, gaining the highest ground within it. The GDA batteries were not in position until that evening, and they spent the next day registering. All the batteries were in the open and by day were under direct observation by the enemy on the high ground beyond the village of Fontaine-Notre-Dame. The six brigades fired a creeping barrage in support of the Guards' attack on Fontaine and the eastern edge of the wood on 27 November; however, the attacking battalions were heavily counter-attacked and driven back with serious casualties. Without reinforcements available, Third Army was forced to shut down the operations in Bourlon Wood, the divisions consolidating the positions they occupied. Guards Division's infantry were relieved next day by 59th (2nd North Midland) Division.

As usual, the GDA brigades remained in position, and were covering 59th (2nd NM) Division when a massive German counter-offensive was launched on 30 November. This division was not in the path of the main assault, and two small infantry attacks were broken up by the combined fire of the Guards, 51st (H), 59th (2nd NM) and one brigade of the 61st (2nd South Midland) divisional artilleries, all under Brig-Gen Wilson. However, the Germans made great progress on the flanks of the Cambrai salient, and the batteries brought up their gun limbers ready to withdraw at short notice, together with the DAC. However, the situation on the flanks was stabilised (that on the south by a counter-attack by Guards Division that recaptured Gouzeaucourt) and the batteries stayed put while the DAC got ammunition up to the Guards infantry. Large amounts of ammunition were received by rail to replenish the DAC's dumps that evening. During the night the two GDA brigades were withdrawn from Bourlon to Flesquières, and Brig-Gen Wilson handed over control of the artillery in the sector, taking over the batteries that were now covering the Guards Division. LXXIV Brigade remained near Flesquières ready to open fire on any German breakthrough to the north, while LXXV Bde with No 3 Section of the DAC and part of CCLXXVII AFA Bde joined Right Group of 12th (E) DA near Heudicourt. It responded to SOS calls from the south on 2 December and then kept the road between Gonnelieu and Villers-Guislain under fire. For several days limber teams from No 2 Section of the DAC attached to LXXIV Bde were employed in recovering captured German guns from Gouzeaucourt. Guards Division was relieved once more on 6 December, but LXXV Bde stayed in the line carrying out shoots for 9th (Scottish) Division until it was relieved on 12–13 December. The DAC's camps in Havrincourt Wood were heavily shelled on 8 and 9 December, resulting in casualties to men and horses.

=== Winter 1917–18 ===
Guards Division was sent to rest and train south of Arras, the GDA billeted round Beaulencourt. The TMBs had not been engaged during the Cambrai operations, resting and training at Moyenneville while the fighting continued in the woods; they now moved to Duisans. The division went back into the line in early January 1918, relieving 15th (Scottish) Division astride the River Scarpe from Monchy-le-Preux to Gavrelle. Between 3 and 5 January the GDA took over 15th (S) DA's guns in situ section by section, together with the ammunition and mortars, the CRA having previously established his HQ in Arras. LXXIV Bde took up positions on the high ground north of the Scarpe, with excellent OPs, while LXXV was round Feuchy and Fampoux. There was little firing except by detached sections against enemy working parties and other observed movement: apart from registration and calibration the main gun positions generally remained silent and hidden. As usual, the DAC loaned out its GS waggons to the engineers and other HQ departments of the division. On 3/4 February a gas bombardment was carried out, and on 9/10 February 15th (S) Division returned to the line, taking over the positions south of the Scarpe. On 27/28 February the guns covered a raid by 2nd Gds Bde against a position known as the 'Nose'.

In February 1918 the BEF reorganised its trench mortars. Divisional TMBs were reduced to two medium batteries, each equipped with six Newton 6-inch Mortars, while heavy batteries became corps troops. In Guards DA, the left and right sections of Z Bty joined X and Y Btys respectively on 8 February 1918, both manned by the RFA. All the RGA personnel and the 9.45-inch mortars went with V Bty to XVII Corps.

=== Spring Offensive ===
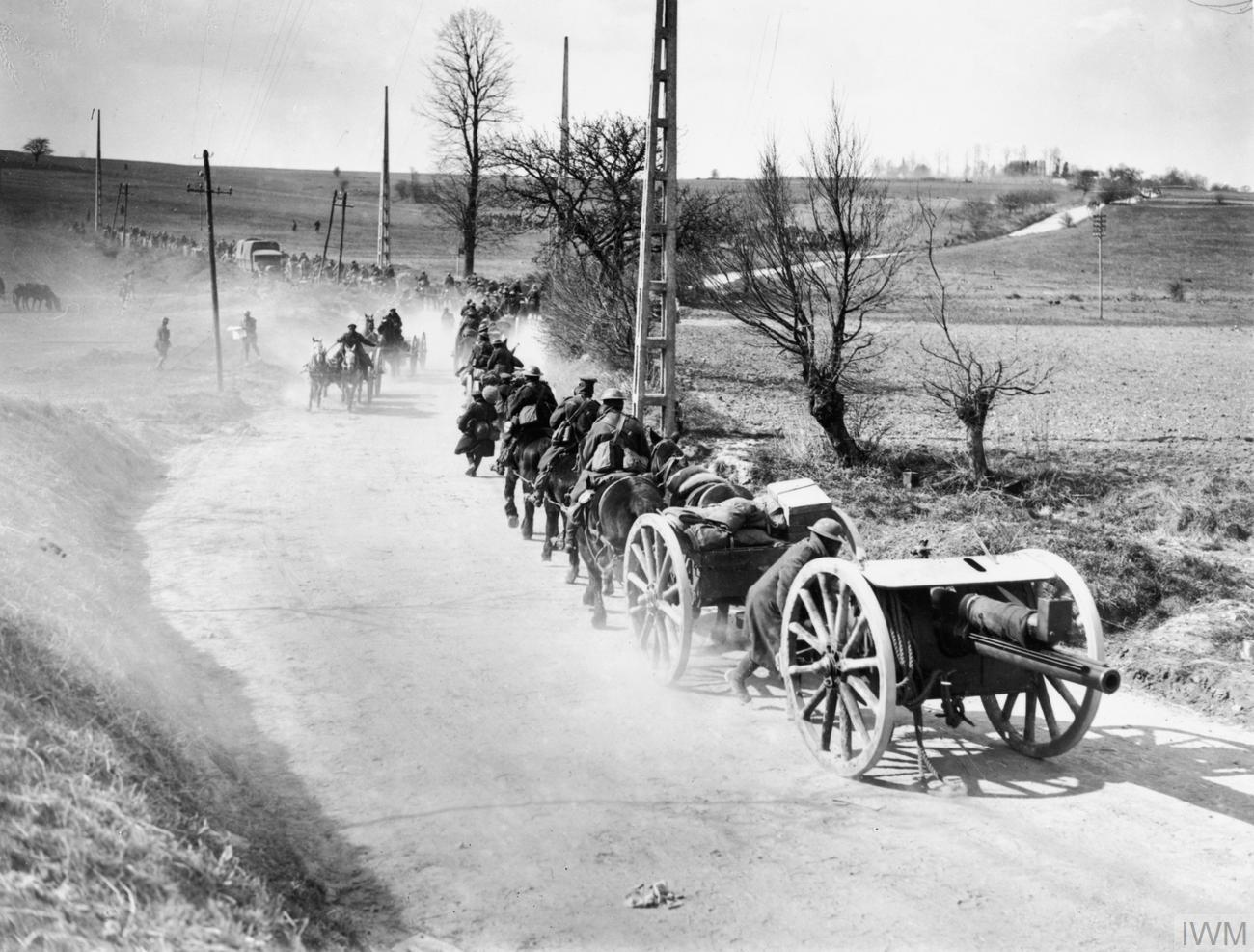
18-pounder battery moving up to meet the German Spring Offensive.

In March the division increased the frequency of raids to gain information on the expected German spring offensive: these were supported by the guns and TMBs. To cover a raid on the night of 5/6 March B/LXXIV Bty fired an accurate barrage at an 'astonishing' rate of 18 rounds per gun in one minute. The artillery practised their SOS and 'counter-preparation' barrages in case of attack, as well as keeping up harassing fire on enemy communications. The division was relieved on 19 March and moved into reserve behind XVII Corps. The German offensive was launched on the morning of 21 March. They bombarded the Arras front heavily but made no attack in this sector, and the planned relief of the GDA was carried out that night. The CRA's HQ moved to Bretencourt and the DAC to Beaumetz, while LXXV Bde was moved to Beaurains, with its guns ready to fire south or southeast, where the Germans were attacking VI Corps.

During 22 March the Germans came close to breaking through VI Corps and the Guards took up positions in the 'Third System' of reserve trenches near Mercatel; that evening they came under the command of VI Corps and remained with it for the rest of the war. Next day the GDA was reinforced by CLV (West Yorkshire) AFA Bde from GHQ Reserve. During 23 March LXXIV Bde moved to positions near the railway line north of Boisleux-au-Mont, while LXXV Bde at Mercatel supported 3rd Division, C Bty destroying a German battery just as it was coming into action; the brigade rejoined the GDA at nightfall. In withdrawing from their positions with the frontline infantry, the TMBs had to leave behind four mortars after rendering them unserviceable. Coming into action next morning between Boisleux and Hamelincourt LXXV Bde covered the whole divisional front, while LXXIV Bde took over the SOS tasks. The Germans made no serious attempt to break through the Guards' positions that day, but considerable numbers passed the division's front while advancing to attack 3rd Division and were driven back by intense rifle and machine gun fire, though their stormtroop tactics of 'dribbling' forward made them difficult targets for the artillery. On 25 March there was considerable German movement in front, but any attempt to advance was broken up by the British artillery. However, with its flank 'in the air' VI Corps was forced to join in the general retirement during the night, pivoting on the Guards' positions. The GDA was ordered back that night to cover a new 'Purple Line' from Adinfer to Ficheux, with HQ at Bavincourt, LXXIV Bde covering 3rd Gds Bde (left), LXXV covering 2nd Gds Bde (right) and CLV AFA Bde covering the whole divisional front as required. Any ammunition that could not be withdrawn was ordered to be fired off or destroyed. The TMBs joined the DAC at Beaumetz and worked on ammunition dumps. Next day the advancing German infantry and artillery presented 'splendid targets' according to the Guards' commander, and the artillery brigades were in action near Hendecourt from the morning onwards. In the afternoon LXXIV Bde moved east of Adinfer to cover a threatened point in the line between Moyennville and Ayette. Over the next three days repeated German attacks 'withered away' in the face of rifle and shellfire, as the Guards held the pivot point around Boisleux-au-Mont and Boisleux-Saint-Marc. On 28 March the Germans renewed their efforts against this northern hinge of the British line around Arras (the Third Battle of Arras). However, the German CB fire was inadequate and the British guns contributed to halting the German attack. A further attempt on 30 March was met by all batteries on the Guards' front firing on the 'SOS' lines with occasional 'rakes' of enemy-occupied villages: the attackers offered 'fine targets' for the guns. At the end of the day the Guards still held their positions. With this failure the German attacks on this sector ended by 31 March.

=== Summer 1918 ===
Although the offensive had been halted, there were still exchanges of artillery fire, including a heavy bombardment on 1 April that wounded Lt-Col J.B. Riddell of LXXV Bde. Even with CLV and part of CLXXVIII AFA Bdes attached, the GDA's resources were really too small for the wide frontage held by the division, but a defence scheme was worked out to cover the critical sectors and CLV Brigade remained with the Guards until the divisional artillery was relieved in the line. The TMBs began constructing new positions between Boisleux and Moyennville. The DAC moved to Gouy-en-Artois. While the Guards infantry were relieved for rest on 16 April the GDA remained to cover 2nd Division, and helped to drive off a local attack. When the Guards Division returned to the line it exchanged with 32nd Division at Gaudiempré, the GDA taking over positions behind Adinfer Wood on 28 April. All three Guards infantry brigades were in the revised defence line, each supported by two RFA brigades and TMBs, LXXIV and Y/Gds in Left Group, LXXV and X/Gds in Centre Group, GDA HQ at Humbercamps controlling all six brigades. Some of the batteries were pushed forward to within 1,000 yards (910 m) of the front line to give them the range to 'search' the enemy rear areas. In addition, four 18-pdrs were posted forwards as anti-tank guns, and four Newton mortars were deployed to defend the Purple Line to the rear. However, these defensive positions were not tested, the next phase of the German offensive having fallen on Second Army to the north. On 6/7 June the Guards Division was withdrawn for a month's rest and training, LXXIV Bde and the TMBs following on 16 June. However LXXV Bde and No 1 Section DAC remained in action under 2nd DA, suffering several guns damaged by enemy shellfire on 8 June. The brigade's gun detachments were much weakened by the outbreak of the Spanish flu epidemic. When the Guards relieved 32nd Division LXXIV Brigade returned to its positions of April at Blairville on 4 July, the TMBs to Boisleux on 8 July, and LXXV Bde finally withdrew on 16 July into mobile reserve at Berles-au-Bois, with C Bty as a mobile anti-tank battery. The GDA HQ was at Bailleulmont. LXXV Brigade returned to the line on 7–9 August.

=== Hundred Days Offensive ===
Fourth Army launched the Allied counter-offensive (the Hundred Days Offensive) with the Battle of Amiens on 8 August. Third Army joined in at the Battle of Albert on 21 August. VI Corps' objective was the Moyenneville–Ablainzevelle Ridge, and 2nd Gds Bde attacked at 04.55 southwards from Hamelincourt. It gained its objectives on the far side of the Achiet–Arras railway with very little resistance apart from 'Hamel Work', which did not surrender until 14.30. The barrage was reported as 'excellent' though LXXV Bde considered that 'the smoke was rather overdone'. GDA HQ moved up to Ransart. VI Corps then regrouped to continue the battle, 56th (1st L) Division coming into the line on the Guards' left. The Guards DAC moved up to camp in the Ransart-Blairville valley where it filled forward dumps, assisted by the men of the TMBs, who left their mortars behind under guard. On 23 August 2nd Gds Bde completed the Guards Division's objectives, covered by protective barrages provided by AFA brigades, while the two GDA brigades formed Right Group of guns supporting the attack of the 56th Division, whose own guns had not had time to register their targets. They brought down a barrage at Zero (04.55), and 56th Division attacked 12 minutes later with complete success, outflanking any points of resistance, capturing Boyelles and Boiry-Becquerelle, and pushing outposts beyond the objective towards the enemy reserve line.

VI Corps continued to advance over the following days. On 24 August 3rd Gds Bde advanced in conjunction with 2nd and 5th (1st L) Divisions behind a barrage that commenced at Zero (07.00). The leading battalions of the Guards were checked by machine guns (MGs) defending St Léger Wood, and being out of touch with the FOOs could not call down artillery fire on them. Another attempt was made on 25 August, GDA HQ now controlling five AFA brigades in addition to its own two (which constituted 'A' Group affiliated to 1st Gds Bde), and ordered the brigade commanders to use their guns boldly, with one two-gun 18-pdr section behind each attacking battalion to deal with MG posts. In the event, the attack was again held up in the rough country round St Léger and 'Banks Trench', and after the early barrage the artillery was kept busy driving of enemy counter-attacks. Enemy shelling was heavier than before, including so much gas shell that the gunners were forced to wear their gas masks while firing. The Guards reorganised and pushed forward outposts into St Léger Wood (which had been abandoned by the enemy) before returning to the attack on 27 August (the Battle of the Scarpe). 1st Guards Bde advanced two battalions but they were held up with heavy casualties. LXXIV and LXXV Bdes were pushed well forward under Lt-Col C.E. Vickery and came under MG fire as they came over the crest of the high ground south of St Léger, C/LXXV Bty suffering numerous casualties. After they came into action three howitzers of D/LXXIV Bty were knocked out. Nonetheless, an artillery concentration on Banks Trench at 19.00 caused the defenders to surrender and the Guards took it over. Afterwards the two artillery brigades were withdrawn into the Sensée valley. 28 August was comparatively quiet, patrols pushing forward as the enemy gave ground. LXXIV Brigade moved into forward positions near Bank Copse, where it was heavily shelled. LXXV Brigade reconnoitred new positions near Hally Copse, but was unable to occupy them due to the shellfire. That evening the Guards infantry were relieved.

As usual the GDA remained in the line covering 3rd Division, which on 29 August was able to advance about 2,000 yards (1,800 m) against minimal opposition except some MGs in the sugar factory at Vraucourt. The two GDA brigades moved up to Mory and the DAC to Boiry-Saint-Martin. The Guards TMBs formed a mobile section with two mortars and ammunition carried on four SAA limbers and two GS waggons provided by the DAC; one detachment was drawn from each battery; the remainder of the mortar men were attached to the DAC to work on dumps. VI Corps attacked on 30 August. 62nd (2nd West Riding) Division was able to advance behind a barrage through the abandoned sugar factory at Vraucourt, but had to withdraw from Vaulx-Vraucourt beyond. 3rd Division attacked Écoust-Saint-Mein and Longatte after they had been bombarded, and kept so close to their barrage (to which the GDA contributed) that they suffered casualties, but reached their objectives. However, 56th (1st L) Division had been thrown out of Bullecourt on their left, and 3rd Division was bundled out again. It completed its task on 1 September and next day attacked towards Lagnicourt, its single infantry brigade being supported by no less than seven RFA brigades, including the GDA. The Germans' Drocourt-Quéant Line was now broken, and when the Guards returned to the attack at 05.20 on 3 September, they found (according to LXXIV Bde) that 'the Boche had slipped clean away'. VI Corps advanced nearly 6 miles (9.7 km), the Guards reaching the Boursies line in the afternoon. Ahead the Germans had re-occupied the old Hindenburg Line behind the Canal du Nord, and their fire dominated the slopes leading down to the canal, preventing the Guards from advancing further. Next day 3rd Gds Bde advanced at 05.00, overrunning the Hindenburg outposts and securing the line of the canal, with its bridges. Support was provided by seven RFA brigades, including the two GDA brigades forming 'Advanced Group'. A further attack at 18.30 under a new barrage was unable to close up to the main Hindenburg position.

=== Canal du Nord ===
Guards Division remained on this line for several days, and the GDA moved up to positions between Louverval and Boursies, the mobile TMB section coming into action on 5/6 September and firing at enemy machine gun positions. German shellfire was so heavy that an attack was feared, so the Guards Machine Gun Regiment was stationed to cover the battery positions. D (H)/LXXV Battery was heavily shelled on 8 September, its commander being wounded. Guards Division played only a small part in the Battle of Havrincourt on 12 September, but the GDA fired smoke to cover 2nd Division on the right as it established bridgeheads across the Canal du Nord near the 'Spoil Heap' the previous evening, and then took part in the barrage for that division's attack in the morning. Over the following days VI Corps pushed forward outposts to prepare for the next attack. The GDA's two brigades formed a group under Lt-Col Vickery covering the Guards' left brigade, and the DAC moved up to Vraucourt. From 19 September the artillery began reconnoitring forward positions and bringing up ammunition, and next day began cutting the wire of the Hindenburg Support line. The Allies launched a coordinated series of offensives along the Western Front on 26 September; Third Army joined in on 27 September (the Battle of the Canal du Nord), with Guards Division tasked with crossing the canal and the Hindenburg First and Support positions. For this operation Brig-Gen Wilson had under his command the GDA ('A' Group) and 2nd DA ('B' Group), one brigade of 21st DA and one AFA brigade ('C' Group) and XXXIX Brigade, RGA (6-inch and 9.2-inch howitzers), as well as the TMBs. The Guards attacked with its three infantry brigades in succession. Starting at 05.20, 2nd Gds Bde cleared the Hindenburg front line without difficulty, but then 1st Bn Coldstream Guards was held up by wire and a machine gun hidden in the dry canal and lost the barrage. They were stopped 200 yards (180 m) short of the Support line until neighbouring troops on their flanks forced the surrender of the enemy in front. 1st Scots Guards, however, was able to keep up with the barrage and take the Support line without difficulty by 07.00, when 1st Gds Bde took up the advance to the second objective. They were slowed by strongpoints and it was not until 12.15 that 3rd Gds Bde was able to pass through them and advance nearly another 1 mile (1.6 km). The RFA brigades had been moving up during the day to keep in range, and 2nd Division was able to pass through at 17.00 behind a smoke barrage to gain a little more ground and allow the Guards infantry to withdraw. Meanwhile, the Guards' Royal Engineers (REs) and pioneers prepared crossings of the dry canal. LXXIV Brigade crossed using the first ramp prepared, and came into action near Flesquières under machine gun fire. LXXV also crossed, at Hermies, and put down a protective barrage on the Graincourt line, advancing again at dusk. The mobile TMB crossed to bring down fire on machine gun posts in the Marcoing line, and later the DAC used 66 waggons to dump thousands of rounds of ammunition across the canal ready for use.

VI Corps continued to advance, gaining Marcoing and crossing the Canal de l'Escaut before resistance hardened on 30 September. On 1 October the GDA supported 2nd Division in an attack on Rumilly. However, as soon as the barrage had passed the enemy began infiltrating the village again. Later the British infantry withdrew so that a renewed bombardment could be put down on the village. After 30 minutes 2nd Division attacked again at 18.30, taking the Germans by surprise and securing a line beyond Rumilly. There was then little activity on VI Corps' front for the next week, LXXV Brigade's waggon lines moved up to 'Nine Wood' where the horses could be watered in the Escaut, actually in front of their batteries but protected by sand banks. The whole brigade later concentrated at Nine Wood in reserve. Then while LXXIV Brigade was left at Quiévy, LXXV Bde supported 2nd Division when the Second Battle of Cambrai was launched on 8 October. The division attacked at 04.30 behind a creeping barrage but was partly pushed back by a German counter-attack employing captured British Mark IV tanks. VI Corps ordered an attack behind a new barrage at 18.00, and this succeeded in taking the second objective. During the day the mobile TMB had been caught by artillery fire in a sunken road, losing men and mules, and had to withdraw to reorganise. That night 2nd Division's infantry were pulled back 300 yards (270 m) from the Esnes–Niergnies road so that next morning's barrage could come down on this line. This was at 05.20, and the attack was made at 05.40 by Guards Division passing through, each brigade being accompanied by sections of field artillery to operate as anti-tank guns if the enemy armour reappeared. However, the enemy had disappeared, and patrols did not locate resistance until the objectives had been achieved. Next day (10 October) Guards Division was ordered to continue the pursuit by bounds, accompanied by the corps cavalry and cyclists, three attached RFA brigades, LXXXIV Bde, RGA, and some tanks. Gun batteries accompanied each infantry battalion: C/LXXV Bty was practically in the front line and at one point too close to use its guns, so the crews used their rifles. 3rd Guards Bde, still acting as advanced guard with attached troops, met more opposition on 11 October, and despite the close artillery support of LXXIV Bde was unable to reach the River Selle. On 12 October they were to resume their advance, but during the day aircraft reported that the enemy had withdrawn, so 3rd Gds Bde went forward at 13.00. They were struck by artillery fire and took cover as they reached the crest overlooking the river, but in the evening were able to continue down the forward slope to the cover of a railway line, supported by B/LXXIV Bty firing from the cover of a hollow. The bulk of the enemy had retired across the Selle, where the GDA engaged them, though they were out of range of the mortars. During the pursuit the DAC had advanced from Havrincourt across the Escaut to Séranvillers, and had salvaged a number of captured German guns.

=== Selle and Sambre ===
The enemy were holding the high ground beyond the Selle. While VI Corps prepared to cross, the Guards held the line at St Vaast, with outposts at St Python on the riverbank. On 16 October the GDA put down a barrage to help the neighbouring 24th Division to close up to the river at Haussy. Apart from wire-cutting and shelling some houses and strongpoints, there was no preliminary bombardment before the Battle of the Selle, which was launched as a surprise attack at 02.00 on 20 October under a full moon. The Guards were covered by the GDA and 2nd DA, together with XIV RHA Bde and LXXVI AFA Bde. While the other brigades fired a creeping barrage, LXXIV put down standing barrages of Thermite and shrapnel on identified machine gun posts. The barrage used no HE shells over the riverside town of Solesmes, which was still occupied by French civilians, who it was hoped could avoid shrapnel and machine gun bullets by sheltering in cellars; the full barrage crept round the sides of the town. While the infantry crossed the river by floating footbridges, the REs built two trestle bridges over the river for the field artillery to advance: the first was ready at 01.45, the other before dawn. LXXIV and LXXV Brigades each detailed a section of 18-pdrs to cross these bridges to be distributed along the front in camouflaged positions for anti-tank duties. The infantry took the first objective with only slight casualties, some caused by getting too close to the barrage, but there was more resistance thereafter and the infantry lost the barrage. While the GDA organised renewed artillery preparation, the enemy in front gave way at 06.30 and by 07.00 the division was on the final objective, overlooking Vertain and Romeries in the Harpies valley. Here they dug in to protect themselves from retaliatory artillery fire, while field batteries pushed up to join them in close support. The mobile TMB had been tasked with destroying some machine gun positions in the morning, but found that the line had already advanced beyond them and they only caught up that night, when they fired at machine guns in a farm in front. Next day there was no formal attack – artillery ammunition supply was restricted because of the difficulties of bringing it over the river, and shortages of water for the horses further back – but infantry patrols pushed forward. The rest of the guns crossed on 21 and 22 October, now under 2nd Division, which had relieved the Guards. They covered attacks by 2nd Division on 23 and 24 October in which it crossed the River Écaillon. Then while VI Corps pushed steadily forwards, the GDA was withdrawn on the night of 24/25 October and left at St Hilaire in corps reserve, overhauling their guns and equipment while the DAC salvaged unused ammunition and other equipment from the recent battlefields.

Guards Division relieved 2nd Division on 2 November for the Battle of the Sambre, which was launched two days later. 1st Guards Bde (left) was covered by the GDA, 2nd Gds Bde (right) by the 2nd DA, and LXIII Bde, RGA, (60-pdrs and 6-inch howitzers), covered the whole divisional front. The covering barrage had to be reorganised on the night of 3/4 November, because patrols had already crossed the River Rhonelle and entered Villers-Pol. In the end the guns put down a simple protective barrage beyond where the patrols were estimated to have reached. 1st Guards Bde forced their way through Villers-Pol during the night, and both brigades advanced at 06.00 on 4 November. By 07.00 the GDA was able to limber up and cross the Rhonelle, LXXIV Bde supporting 1st Gds Bde and LXXV Bde with 2nd Gds Bde, the guns dealing with machine gun posts as the infantry advanced. A/LXXIV Battery was brought up at a gallop to deal with one strongpoint in a wood at Wargnies-le-Petit, and the mobile TMB section also supported the Guards up the Villers-Pol–Wargnies road. Next day 3rd Gds Bde passed through the line and continued the advance through Amfroipret. A slight delay by enemy machine guns was dealt with by the field guns, though C/LXXV Bde suffered heavy casualties, and the Guards continued to Bermeries, where the Germans made a stand. Despite heavy mud and impassable roads, the two field brigades kept up with the advance and the forward sections came into action 500 yards (460 m) west of Bermeries to engage machine guns. 3rd Guards Bde and the two field brigades continued on 6 November, driving the enemy out of Mecquignies Chateau, and entering Bavay early next morning after the field guns had silenced the German machine guns. 2nd Guards Bde took over on 7 November, advancing with the field guns, B/LXXIV Bty coming into action at 700 yards (640 m) to silence some machine guns. LXXV Brigade moved forward to Malgarni, despite numerous casualties, particularly to D (H) Bty, from German field guns. The roads had been deliberately cratered by the enemy, and the mobile TMBs could not get into action until the next day. 2nd Guards Bde met stubborn resistance on 8 November from rearguards at La Longueville, where LXV Bde shelled machine gunners out of some houses, but that night the Guards entered Maubeuge, which the Germans were evacuating. Divisional HQ was established in the fortress city, the gunners took up billets in the cavalry barracks, and the REs began bridging the River Sambre to prepare for the next advance. However, hostilities ended at 11.00 on 11 November when the Armistice with Germany came into force.

=== Post-Armistice ===
VI Corps was selected to serve in Germany as part of the Allied Occupation of the Rhineland. The GDA reorganised its batteries from 6 to 4 guns to simplify refitting and economise on horsepower for the long march to Coblenz; the DAC received 100 fresh horses for distribution to the brigades before the move. LXXVI AFA Brigade was also attached to the GDA once more, together with LXIII RGA Bde. Guards Division began the advance from the Armistice line on 18 November, with the artillery following next day in Groups C and D with the machine gun battalion, the mobile veterinary section, and elements of the divisional engineers and transport. The Belgian roads were in a bad state, but by 30 November the column had passed the River Meuse. The artillery crossed the German frontier on 13 December. 2nd Guards Bde was sent ahead by train and reached Cologne on 14 December, Divisional HQ opened there on 18 December and the remainder of the division arrived in the Cologne bridgehead by 19 December. The Guards TMBs remained training at Solesmes until 29 December when they entrained to join the rest of the GDA in Germany. By the end of the year the GDA was distributed as follows:

- GDA HQ – Nippes, Cologne
- LXXIV Bde – Lövenich
- LXXV Bde – Klein Königsdorf
- LXXIV AFA Bde – Pulheim
- Guards DAC – Brauweiler
- Guards TMBs – Mengenich
- LXIII RGA Bde – Frechen

Demobilisation began from 1 January 1919, with urgently needed mineworkers being released first. The TMBs were absorbed into the DAC on 22 February. On 15 March 3rd Division was redesignated 'Northern Division' in British Army of the Rhine (BAOR), and Guards DA was transferred to it, while the rest of Guards Division returned to the UK. Representatives of the former GDA took part in the Guards Division's ceremonial march through London on 22 March. The units of Northern DA were progressively demobilised, and Northern Division was disbanded about October.

== LXXVI Army Field Artillery Brigade ==
LXXVI AFA Brigade formally left Guards DA on 19 January 1917. It was with XIV Corps on the Ancre Heights, and then moved to Canadian Corps for the Battle of Vimy Ridge. It served with IX Corps at the Battle of Messines and then returned to XIV Corps for the Ypres Offensive before going to Italy with XIV Corps in late 1917. It returned to the Western Front in 1918 where it fought under VI Corps throughout the Hundred Days Offensive, including the period 14–23 October when it was attached to Guards DA for the Battle of the Selle. It was attached to Guards DA after the Armistice and accompanied it on the march to the Rhineland. When Guards DA joined Northern Division (former 3rd Division) in BAOR, LXXVI Bde joined the cadres of 3rd DA for demobilisation.

== Commanders ==
The following officers commanded Guards Divisional Artillery and its units during the war:

CRA

- Brig-Gen C.E. Goulburn, DSO, from formation to 12 September 1915
- Brig-Gen Alexander Wardrop, CMG, 13 September 1915 to 28 February 1916 (to CCRA XIV Corps)
- Brig-Gen W. Evans, DSO, 1 March 1916 to 27 May 1917
- Lt-Col A.B. Bethell, DSO, acting 25 March–10 April 1916
- Brig-Gen Francis Wilson, CMG, DSO, promoted 13 June 1917, until return to UK

Brigade Major

- Maj D. Le P. Trench, MC, from formation to 19 February 1917
- Maj A.S. Archdale, DSO, 20 February 1917 to 13 June 1918
- Maj P.G. Yorke, 24 June 1918 to 2 October 1918
- Maj W.E. Mann, DSO, 3 October 1918 until return to UK

Staff Captain

- Capt W.E. Mann, DSO, 28 August 1915 to 12 January 1916
- Capt J.A. Batten Poole, MC (5th Lancers), 13 January 1916 to 19 December 1916
- Capt B. Williams, MC (late 13th Hussars), 26 December 1916 until return to UK

LXI (H) Bde

- Lt-Col G.N. Cartwright, from formation to 15 October 1915 (promoted to CRA 1st Division)
- Lt-Col F.A. Buzzard, DSO, 16 October 1915 until disbandment

LXXIV Bde

- Lt-Col L.P. Garden, from formation to 19 November 1915 (sick)
- Maj C. Ravenhill, acting 26 November 1915
- Lt-Col C. Ravenhill, promoted 25 January 1916 to 5 May 1916
- Lt-Col J.B. Riddell, 6 May 1916 to 15 November 1916
- Lt-Col Frank Buzzard, DSO, from LXI Bde 16 November 1916 to 24 July 1917 (wounded)
- Lt-Col C.E. Vickery, DSO, 27 July 1917 until return to UK

LXXV Bde

- Lt-Col F.R. Thackeray, from formation to 8 October 1915 (died 15 October)
- Lt-Col A.B. Bethell, DSO, 9 October 1915 to February 1918
- Lt-Col J.B. Riddell, DSO, 23 February 1918 to 1 April 1918 (wounded)
- Lt-Col W.C.E. Rudkin, CMG, DSO, 20 April 1918 to 24 June 1918
- Lt-Col T. Kirkland, DSO, from 25 June 1918

LXXVI Bde

- Col R.D. Gubbins, from formation to 3 November 1915
- Lt-Col G.R.V. Kinsman, DSO, 3 November 1916 to May 1916 (sick)
- Lt-Col F.C. Bryant, CMG, from May 1916 until brigade became AFA

Gds DAC

- Lt-Col H. Fawcus, from formation to 15 May 1916 (sick)
- Lt-Col C.B. Watkins, from 16 May 1916

== Memorials ==
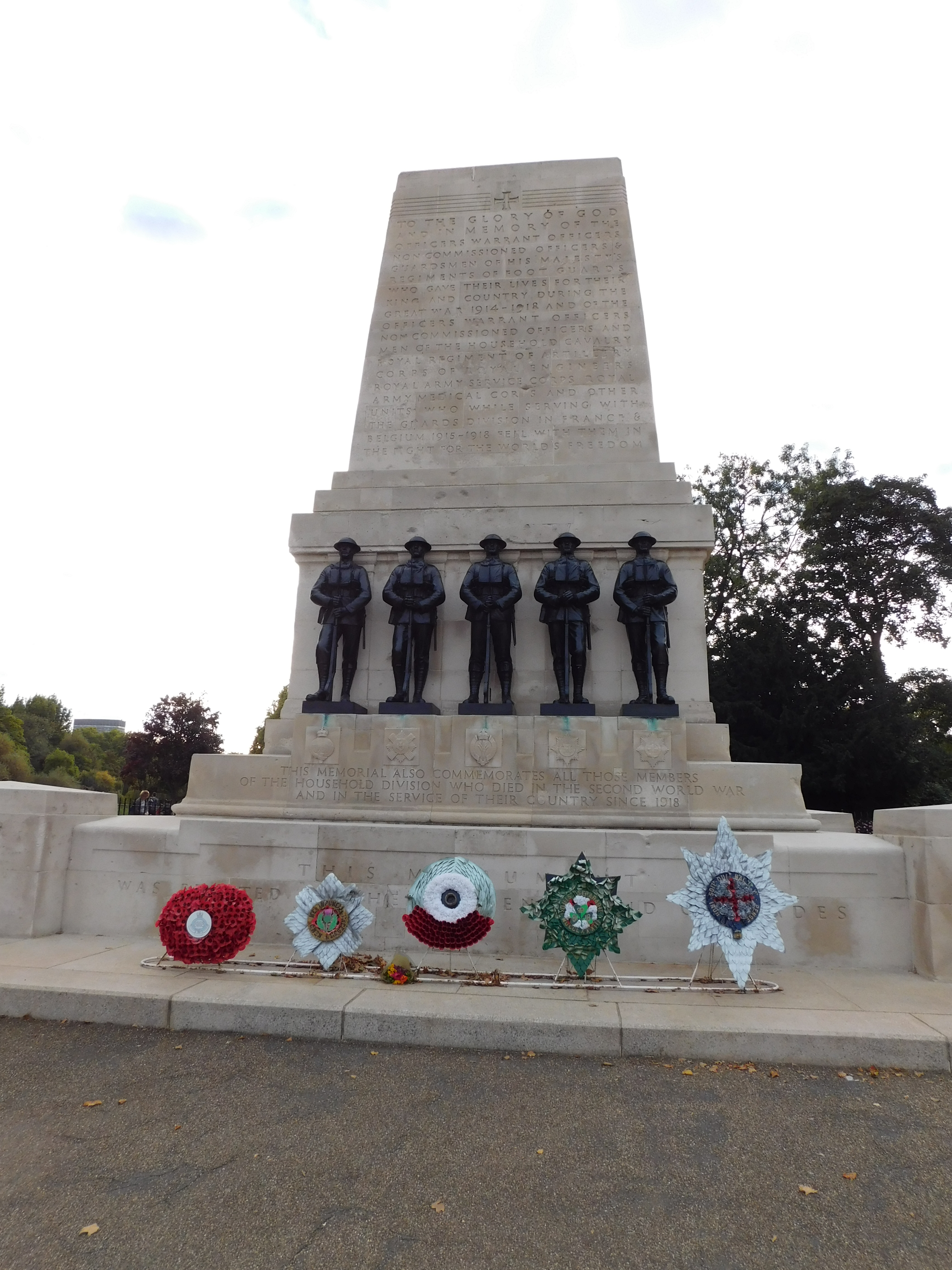
Guards Division Memorial.

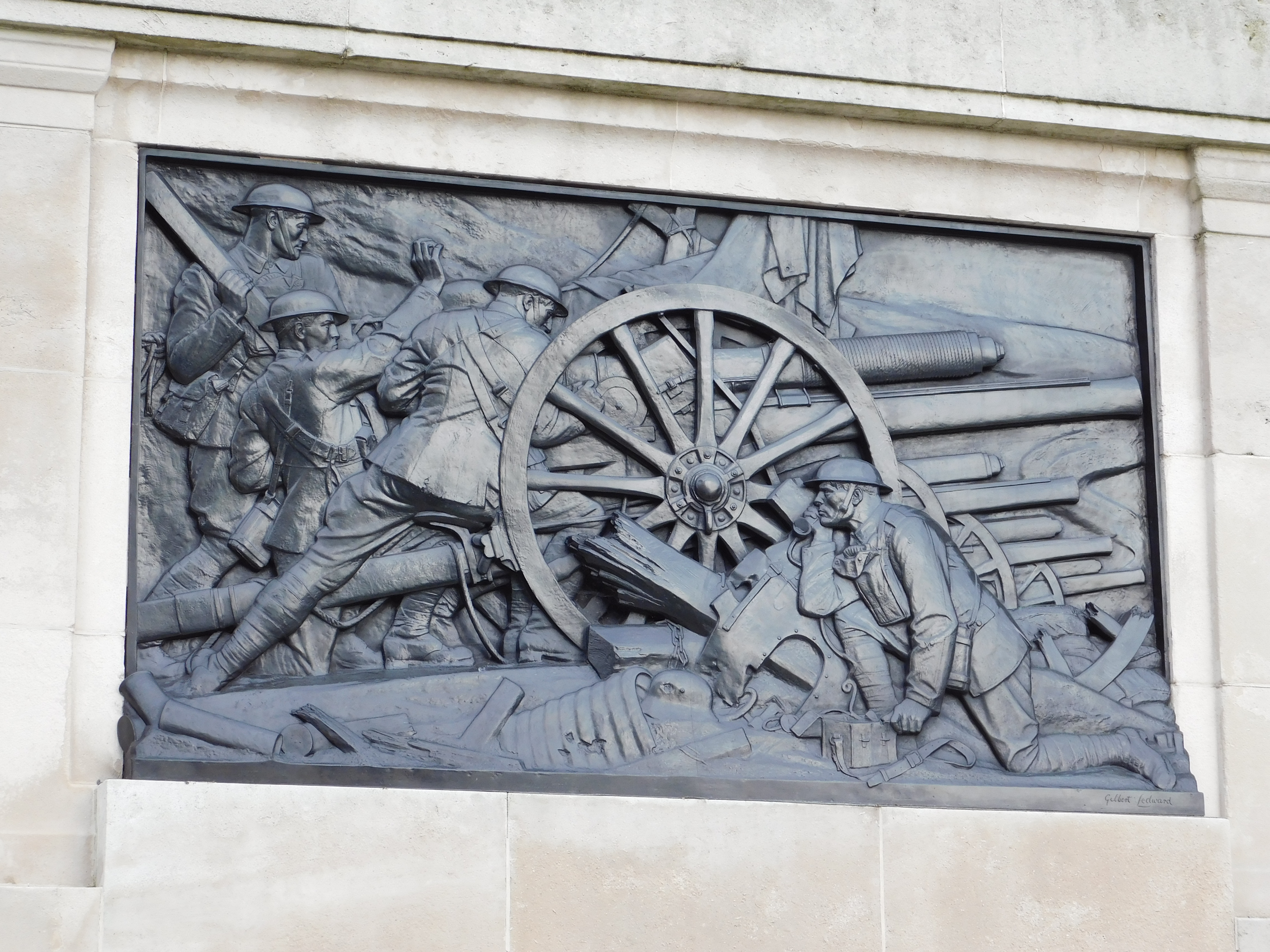
West panel of the Guards Division Memorial.

The Guards Division Memorial opposite Horse Guards Parade in London, dedicated in 1926, carries bronze figures representing the five regiments of foot guards, but the stone cenotaph above lists all the units of the Guards Division, including the four artillery brigades, the TMBs and the DAC. A bronze relief panel on the west face depicts the artillery in action. The figures and panels were sculpted by Gilbert Ledward, who had himself served in the war as an artillery officer, and were cast from captured German guns.

There is also a Guards Division Memorial near the Commonwealth War Graves Commission's Guards' Cemetery on the road from Ginchy to Lesboeufs, where the division attacked on 15 September 1916.
