= Edward Thompson (footballer) =

English footballer

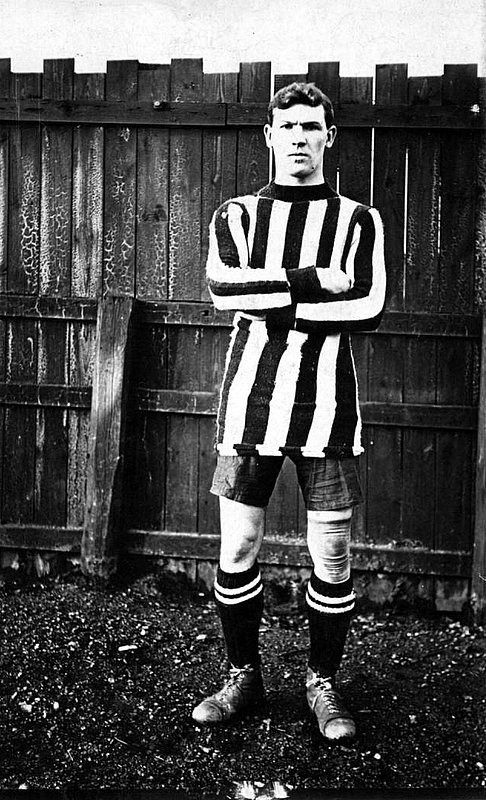

Personal information
- Full name: Edward William Thompson
- Date of birth: July 1894
- Place of birth: Prudhoe, England
- Date of death: 6 November 1918 (aged 24)
- Place of death: Bermeries, France
- Position: Left back

Senior career*
Years	Team	Apps	(Gls)
–1914	Spen Black and White		
1914–1915	Fulham	1	(0)
- * Club domestic league appearances and goals

Edward William Thompson (July 1894 – 6 November 1918) was an English amateur footballer who made one appearance in the Football League for Fulham as a left back.

== Personal life ==
Thompson worked as a putter and stoneman at Emma Colliery, Ryton. He enlisted as a private in the Scots Guards in February 1917, during the First World War. Two months later, his brother Charlton was killed in France while serving with the Durham Light Infantry. Thompson was involved in the Battle of the Sambre-Oise Canal on 4 November 1918, and was killed in action while serving with the 2nd Battalion, Scots Guards at Bermeries two days later, just five days before the armistice with Germany. He was one of the two last English footballers to die in the war, dying on the same day as George Lake. He was buried in Bermeries Communal Cemetery.

== Career statistics ==
Appearances and goals by club, season and competition
Club	Season	League			FA Cup		Total	
Club	Season	Division	Apps	Goals	Apps	Goals	Apps	Goals
Fulham	1914–15	Second Division	1	0	0	0	1	0
Career total			1	0	0	0	1	0
