= L'Orée de Mormal =

- Commune
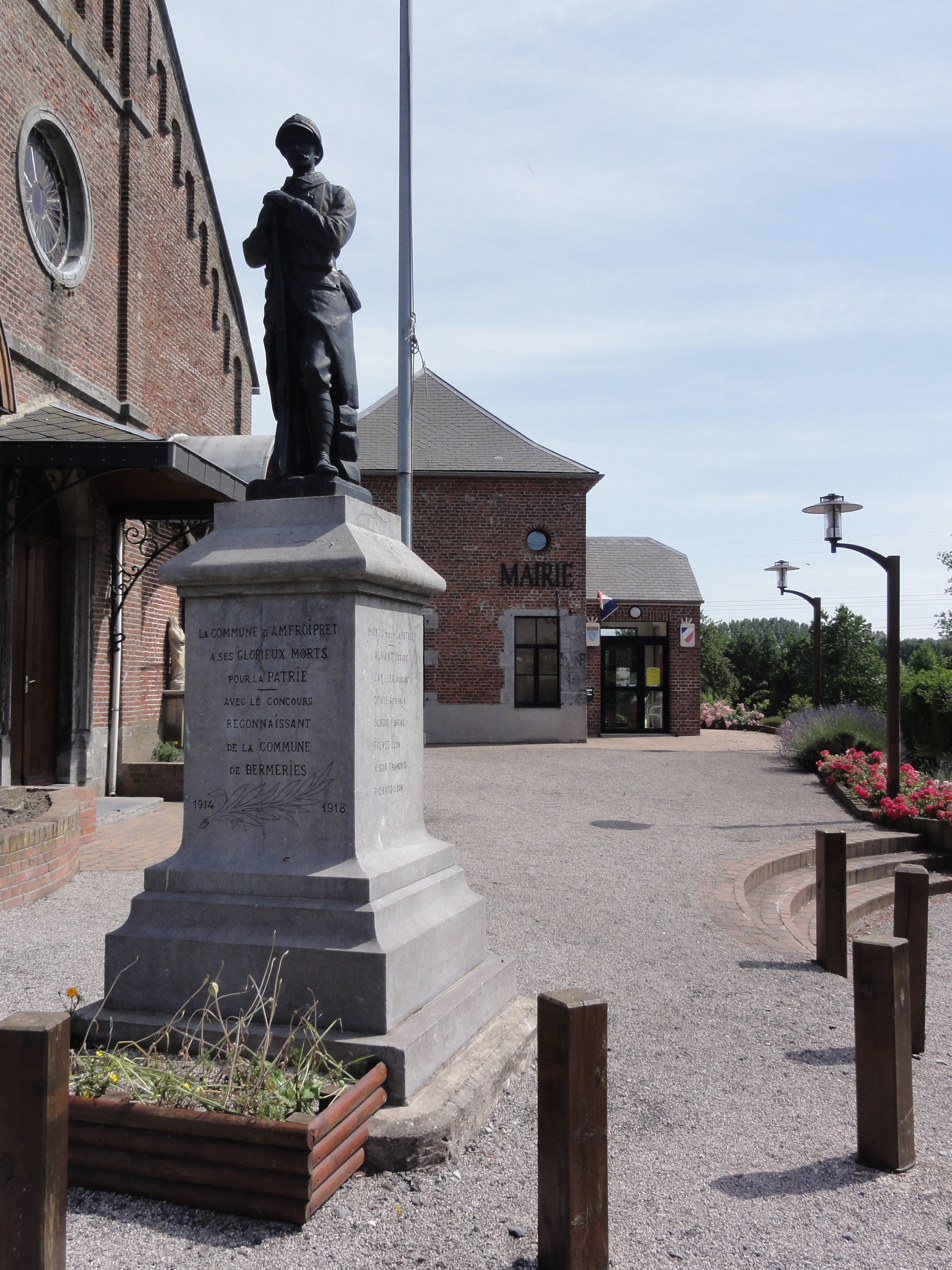
- The town hall and war memorial in Amfroipret
- Location of L'Orée de Mormal
- Location within France Location within Hauts-de-France
- Coordinates: 50°16′50″N 3°44′18″E
- Country: France
- Region: Hauts-de-France
- Department: Nord
- Arrondissement: Avesnes-sur-Helpe
- Canton: Aulnoye-Aymeries
- Intercommunality: CC Pays de Mormal

Government
  - Mayor (2025–2026): Philippe Eustache
- Area^{1}: 6.83 km^{2} (2.64 sq mi)
- Highest elevation: 153 m (502 ft)
- Lowest elevation: 113 m (371 ft)
- Population (2023): 619
  - Density: 90.6/km^{2} (235/sq mi)
- Time zone: UTC+01:00 (CET)
  - Summer (DST): UTC+02:00 (CEST)
- INSEE/Postal code: 59006 /59144
- ^{1} French Land Register data, which excludes lakes, ponds, glaciers > 1 km^{2} (0.386 sq mi or 247 acres) and river estuaries.

L'Orée de Mormal (French pronunciation: [lɔʁe də mɔʁmal]) is a commune in the Nord department in northern France. It was formed on 1 January 2025, with the merger of Amfroipret and Bermeries.

== See also ==
- Communes of the Nord department
