= George Lake (footballer) =

English footballer (1889–1918)

Personal information
- Full name: George Andrew Lake
- Date of birth: 12 May 1889
- Place of birth: Eastham, England
- Date of death: November 6, 1918 (aged 29)
- Place of death: Sambre-Oise Canal, near Frasnoy, France
- Height: 5 ft 8 in (1.73 m)
- Position: Left half

Senior career*
Years	Team	Apps	(Gls)
1913	Manchester City	0	(0)
1913–1915	Chelsea	1	(0)
- * Club domestic league appearances and goals

George Andrew Lake (12 May 1889 – 6 November 1918) was an English professional footballer who made one appearance in the Football League for Chelsea as a left half.

== Personal life ==
In 1915, during the second year of the First World War, Lake enlisted as a private in the 66th (2nd East Lancashire) Divisional Cyclist Company. He was later transferred to the Hampshire Regiment (later the Royal Hampshire Regiment) for service overseas, eventually joining the 2nd/4th Battalion of the regiment. Lake died of wounds on 6 November 1918, five days before the armistice with Germany, two days after his battalion's attempt to cross the Sambre–Oise Canal near Frasnoy, France. He was buried in Frasnoy Communal Cemetery. Lake was one of the two last English footballers to die in the war, dying on the same day as Edward Thompson. His great-nephew, Paul, would also become a footballer.

== Career statistics ==
Appearances and goals by club, season and competition
Club	Season	League			FA Cup		Total	
Club	Season	Division	Apps	Goals	Apps	Goals	Apps	Goals
Chelsea	1913–14	First Division	1	0	0	0	1	0
Career total			1	0	0	0	1	0
