= Francis Adrian Wilson =

British Army officer

Major-General Francis Adrian Wilson CB CMG DSO
- Born: 12 October 1874; London, England
- Died: 6 May 1954 (aged 79); Surrey, England
- Military career
- Allegiance: United Kingdom
- Branch: British Army
- Rank: Major-General
- Commands: Chief of the Australian General Staff
- Conflicts: Second Boer War; First World War
- Awards: Companion of the Order of the Bath; Companion of the Order of St Michael and St George; Distinguished Service Order; Mentioned in Despatches; Légion d'honneur (France)

Major-General Francis Adrian Wilson, CB, CMG, DSO (12 October 1874 – 6 May 1954) was a senior officer in the British Army who served as Chief of the General Staff in Australia from 1911 to 1912 and was a senior artillery commander during World War I.

== Military career ==
Wilson was commissioned into the Royal Artillery as a second lieutenant on 1 July 1895, and promoted to a lieutenant on 17 November 1897.

He served in the Second Boer War in South Africa, during which he was promoted to captain on 6 February 1901. He was mentioned in despatches (including the final despatch by Lord Kitchener dated 23 June 1902), and was awarded the Distinguished Service Order (DSO). The war ended in June 1902, and Wilson returned to the united Kingdom on the SS Syria two months later, arriving in Southampton in early September.

He was promoted to Major on 1 August 1911 and served as Chief of the General Staff in Australia from 1911 to 1912.

On the outbreak of World War he was commanding 61st (Howitzer) Battery, Royal Field Artillery, at Kildare in Ireland. by June 1917 he was a Lieutenant-Colonel in command of XCI Brigade, Royal Field Artillery, serving in 20th (Light) Division on the Western Front. He was appointed Commander, Royal Artillery, (CRA) of Guards Division on 12 June 1917 with the rank of Temporary Brigadier-General. He commanded the Guards Divisional Artillery through the Battle of Passchendaele, the German spring offensive and the Allies' victorious Hundred Days Offensive until the end of the war. His service in the war led to the award of the Companion of the Order of St Michael and St George and the Légion d'honneur.

After the war he became CRA for Eastern Command for which service he was awarded the Companion of the Order of the Bath.

== Personal life ==
In 1903, he married Mabel Crosfield, with whom he had a son and a daughter. He died in 1954 at his home near Farnham, Surrey.

Military offices
Preceded by Major General John Hoad	Chief of the Australian General Staff; 1911–1912	Succeeded by Brigadier General Joseph Gordon
