= Alexander Wardrop =

British Army general

General Sir Alexander Wardrop GCB CMG
- Born: 15 September 1872; Bombay, British India
- Died: 22 June 1961 (aged 88); Upham, Hampshire, England
- Military career
- Allegiance: United Kingdom
- Branch: British Army
- Service years: 1892–1937
- Rank: General
- Unit: First World War
- Commands: British Troops in Palestine; Northern Command
- Awards: Knight Grand Cross of the Order of the Bath; Companion of the Order of St Michael and St George

General Sir Alexander Ernest Wardrop GCB CMG (15 September 1872 – 22 June 1961) was a British Army officer who rose to high rank in the 1930s.

== Education ==
Wardrop was the only son of Maj.-Gen. Alexander Wardrop. He was educated at Haileybury and the Royal Military Academy, Woolwich.

== Military career ==
Wardrop was commissioned into the Royal Artillery in 1892. He was promoted to major in the Royal Horse Artillery on 5 August 1909 and on the outbreak of the Great War was commanding R Battery at Woolwich.

After seeing active service, he was appointed commander, Royal Artillery, (CRA) of Guards Division on 13 September 1915 with the rank of brigadier-general. He commanded the Guards Divisional Artillery on the Western Front until 29 February 1916 when he was promoted to be Corps CRA for XIV Corps. He led the corps' artillery on the Western Front and in Italian Front until 10 March 1918, when he became brigadier-general, Royal Artillery, for the British Force in Italy. Of 3 August 1918 he returned to the Western Front when he was promoted to major-general, Royal Artillery, of Third Army, commanding it through the Allies' victorious Hundred Days Offensive.

After the war he was promoted to substantive major general in June 1919 and served as commander of British Troops in Palestine from 1921. He was placed on half-pay on 12 May 1929 and promoted to lieutenant general on 30 July.

He became quartermaster-general for India in 1930 and general officer commanding-in-chief for Northern Command in 1933; he was promoted to general and retired from the army on 12 October 1937.

He lived at Upham in Hampshire.

Military offices
Preceded by Sir Francis Gathorne-Hardy	GOC-in-C Northern Command; 1933–1937	Succeeded by Sir William Bartholomew
