= Amfroipret =

- Part of L'Orée de Mormal
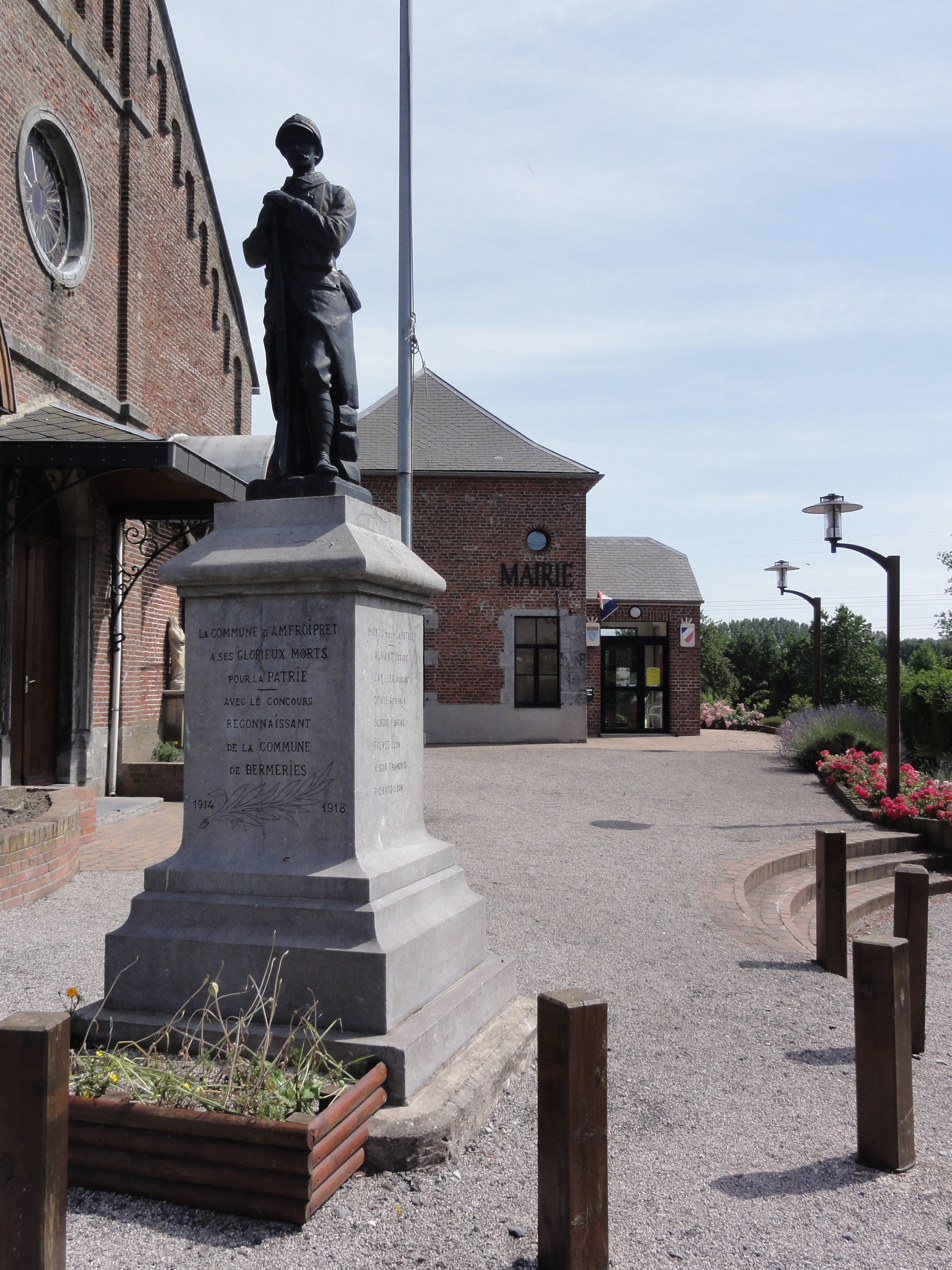
- The town hall and war memorial in Amfroipret

- Coat of arms
- Location of Amfroipret
- Location within France Location within Hauts-de-France
- Coordinates: 50°16′50″N 3°44′18″E
- Country: France
- Region: Hauts-de-France
- Department: Nord
- Arrondissement: Avesnes-sur-Helpe
- Canton: Aulnoye-Aymeries
- Commune: L'Orée de Mormal
- Area^{1}: 1.54 km^{2} (0.59 sq mi)
- Elevation: 146 m (479 ft)
- Highest elevation: 146 m (479 ft)
- Lowest elevation: 125 m (410 ft)
- Population (2022): 232
  - Density: 151/km^{2} (390/sq mi)
- Time zone: UTC+01:00 (CET)
  - Summer (DST): UTC+02:00 (CEST)
- Postal code: 59144
- ^{1} French Land Register data, which excludes lakes, ponds, glaciers > 1 km^{2} (0.386 sq mi or 247 acres) and river estuaries.

Amfroipret (French pronunciation: [ɑ̃fʁwapʁɛ]) is a former commune in the Nord department in northern France. On 1 January 2025, it was merged into the new commune of L'Orée de Mormal.

== Population ==
Historical population
Year	Pop.	±% p.a.
1968	157	—
1975	148	−0.84%
1982	150	+0.19%
1990	173	+1.80%
1999	156	−1.14%
2009	215	+3.26%
2014	239	+2.14%
2020	213	−1.90%
Source: INSEE

== Heraldry ==
Arms of Amfroipret	The arms of Amfroipret are blazoned : Azure, a lion argent, a chief Or.

== See also ==
- Communes of the Nord department
