= Bermeries =

- Part of L'Orée de Mormal
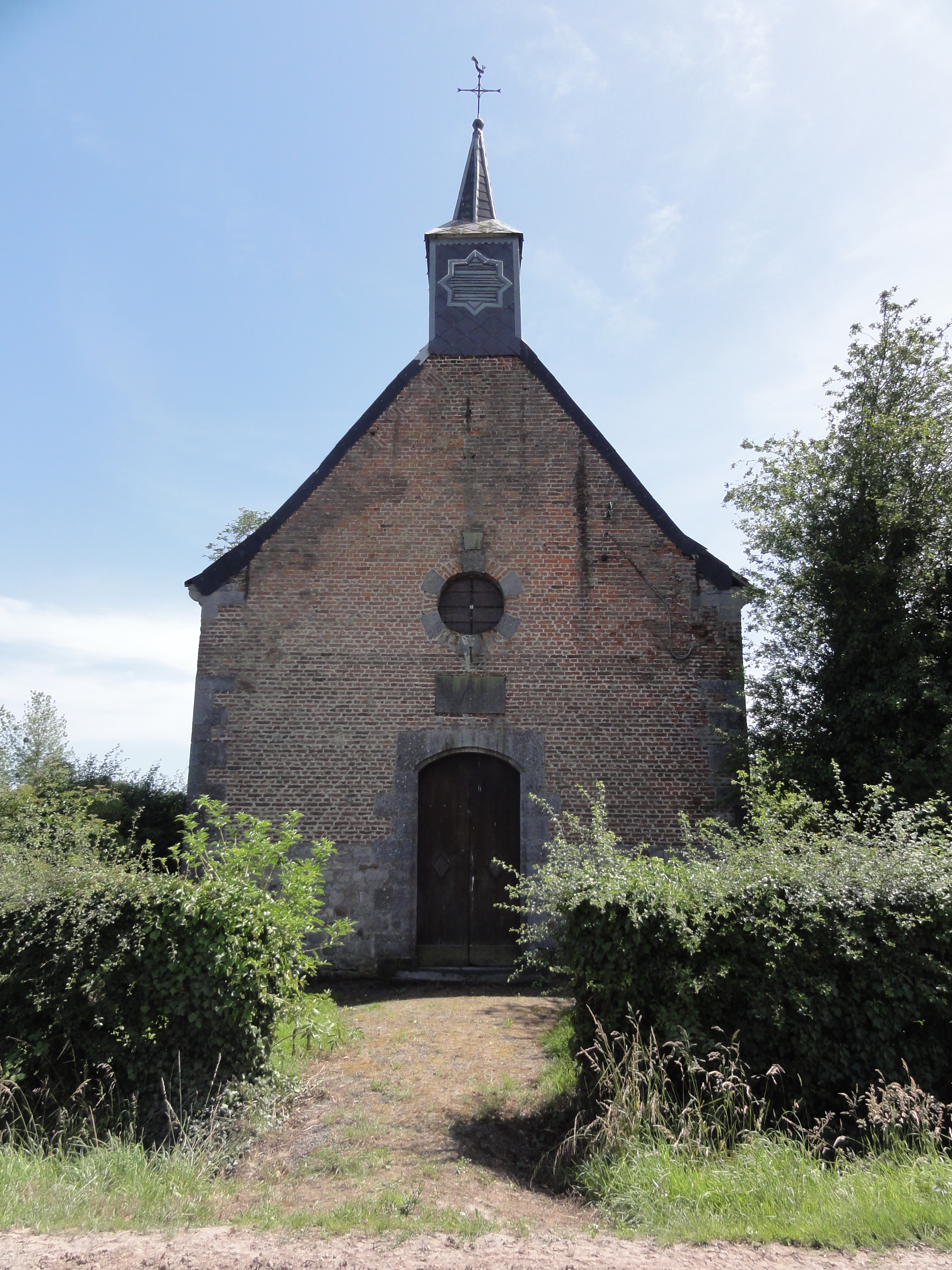
- The chapel in Bermeries

- Coat of arms
- Location of Bermeries
- Location within France Location within Hauts-de-France
- Coordinates: 50°17′14″N 3°45′25″E
- Country: France
- Region: Hauts-de-France
- Department: Nord
- Arrondissement: Avesnes-sur-Helpe
- Canton: Aulnoye-Aymeries
- Commune: L'Orée de Mormal
- Area^{1}: 5.29 km^{2} (2.04 sq mi)
- Elevation: 126 m (413 ft)
- Highest elevation: 153 m (502 ft)
- Lowest elevation: 113 m (371 ft)
- Population (2022): 377
  - Density: 71.3/km^{2} (185/sq mi)
- Time zone: UTC+01:00 (CET)
  - Summer (DST): UTC+02:00 (CEST)
- Postal code: 59570
- ^{1} French Land Register data, which excludes lakes, ponds, glaciers > 1 km^{2} (0.386 sq mi or 247 acres) and river estuaries.

Bermeries (French pronunciation: [bɛʁməʁi]) is a former commune in the Nord department in northern France. On 1 January 2025, it was merged into the new commune of L'Orée de Mormal.

== Population ==
Historical population
Year	Pop.	±% p.a.
1968	252	—
1975	236	−0.93%
1982	307	+3.83%
1990	318	+0.44%
1999	305	−0.46%
2009	386	+2.38%
2014	378	−0.42%
2020	376	−0.09%
Source: INSEE

== Heraldry ==
Arms of Bermeries	The arms of Bermeries are blazoned : Argent, a chief gules, overall a tree vert between 6 fish azure - the dexter 3 bendwise sinister, the sinister 3 bendwise.

== See also ==
- Communes of the Nord department
