= Frasnoy =

- Commune
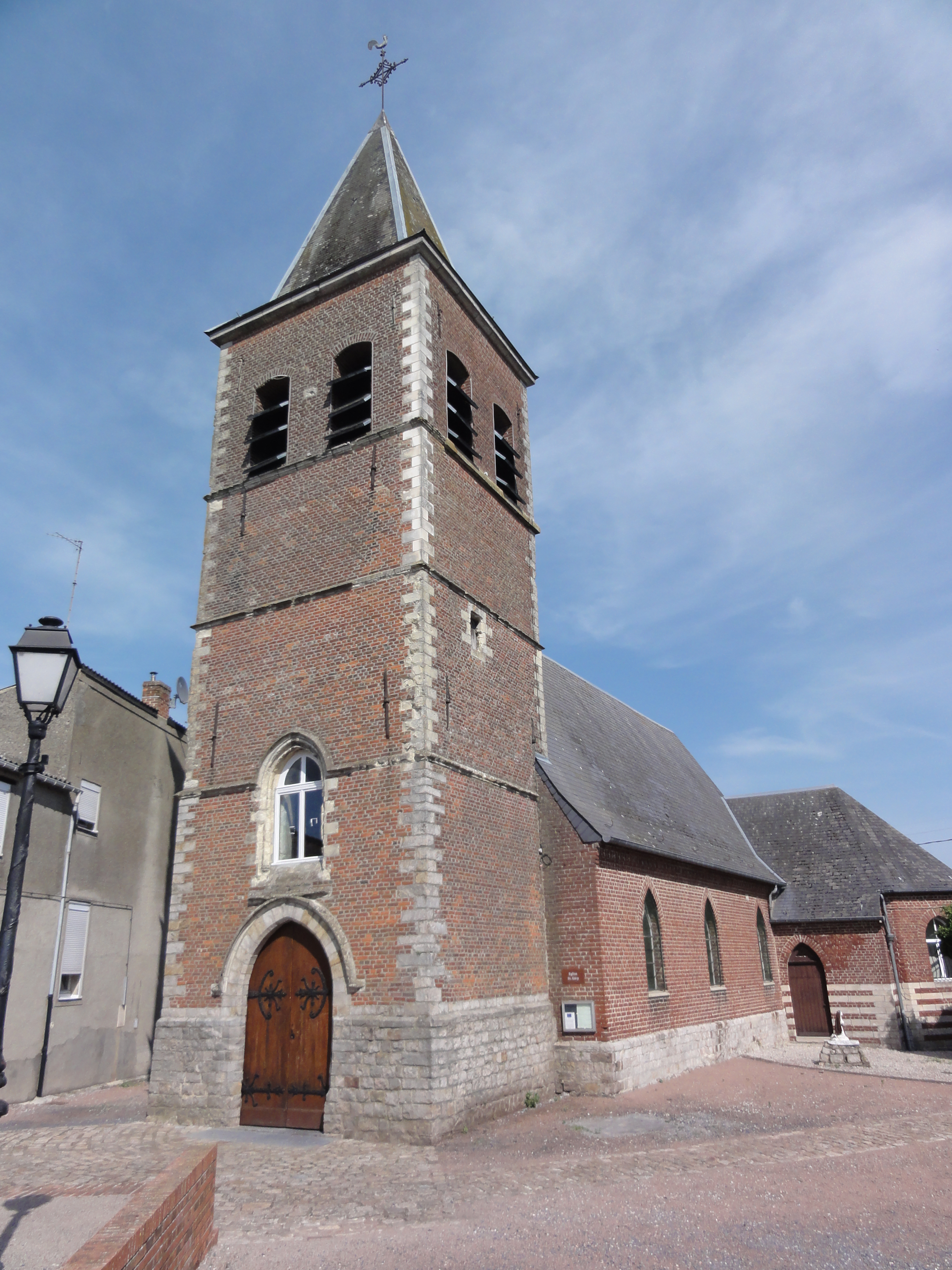
- The church in Frasnoy

- Coat of arms
- Location of Frasnoy
- Location within France Location within Hauts-de-France
- Coordinates: 50°16′14″N 3°40′48″E
- Country: France
- Region: Hauts-de-France
- Department: Nord
- Arrondissement: Avesnes-sur-Helpe
- Canton: Aulnoye-Aymeries
- Intercommunality: CC Pays de Mormal

Government
  - Mayor (2020–2026): Gautier Meausoone
- Area^{1}: 5.84 km^{2} (2.25 sq mi)
- Elevation: 123 m (404 ft)
- Highest elevation: 131 m (430 ft)
- Lowest elevation: 83 m (272 ft)
- Population (2023): 389
  - Density: 66.6/km^{2} (173/sq mi)
- Time zone: UTC+01:00 (CET)
  - Summer (DST): UTC+02:00 (CEST)
- INSEE/Postal code: 59251 /59530
- ^{1} French Land Register data, which excludes lakes, ponds, glaciers > 1 km^{2} (0.386 sq mi or 247 acres) and river estuaries.

Frasnoy (French pronunciation: [fʁanwa]) is a commune in the Nord department in northern France.

== Heraldry ==
Arms of Frasnoy	The arms of Frasnoy are blazoned : Or, 3 pales azure, overall a tower argent.

== See also ==
- Communes of the Nord department
